= Cramond Roman Fort =

Roman fort in Edinburgh, Scotland

- Carumabo?, Rumabo?
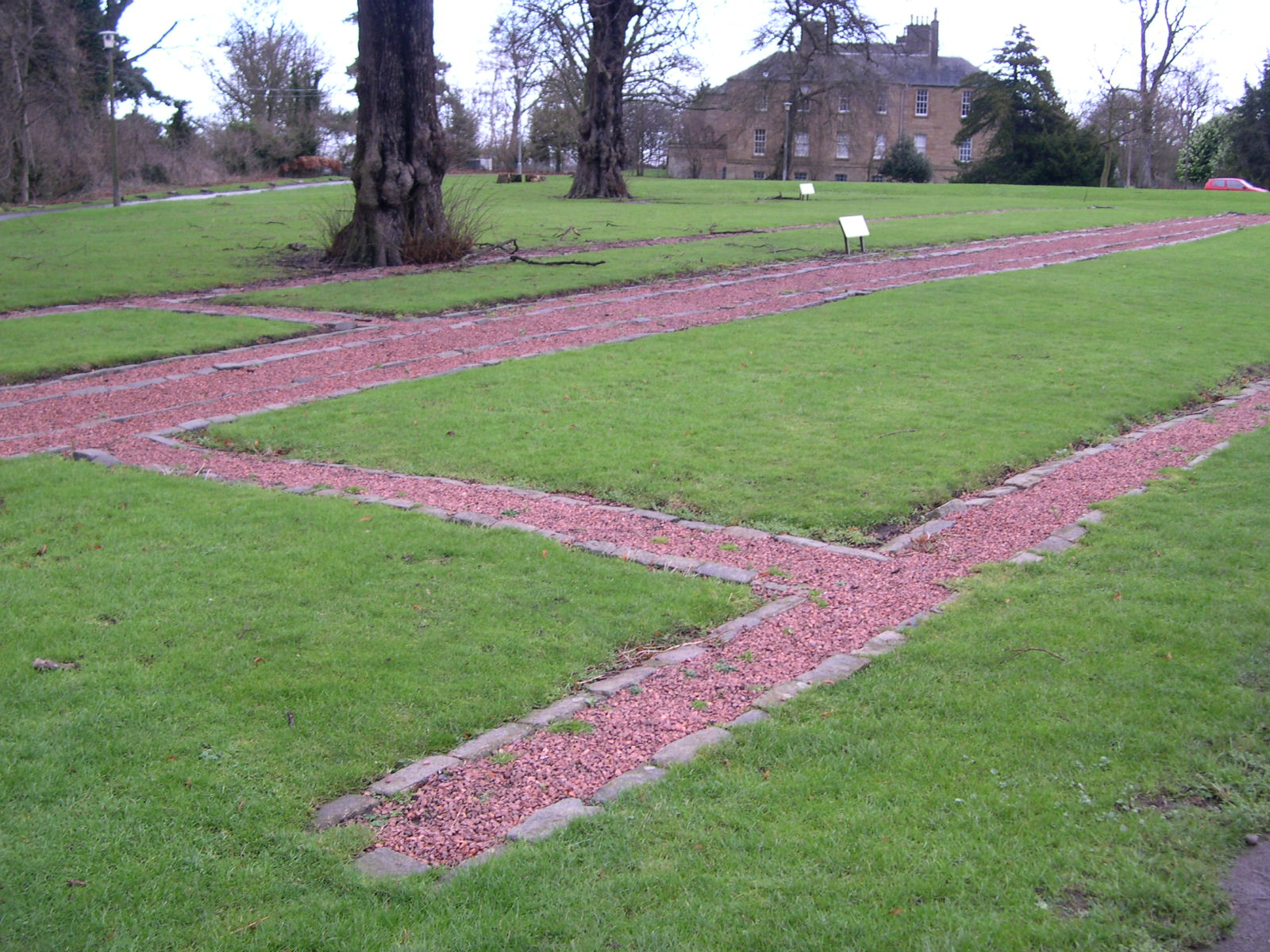
- Site of the Roman fort at Cramond

- Location within Edinburgh
- 55.9774°N 3.2967°W
- Location: Edinburgh, Scotland

History
- Founded: c. 140 AD
- Abandoned: 4th century AD

Cramond Roman Fort is a Roman-Era archaeological site at Cramond, Edinburgh, Scotland. The settlement may be the "Rumabo" listed in the 7th-century Ravenna Cosmography.

The fort was established around 140 AD and occupied until around 170 AD, with a further period of occupation from around 208 to 214 AD. Among the many archaeological finds, one of the most famous is a sculpture known as the Cramond Lioness.

== History ==
The fort at Cramond was located on the River Almond at the point where it flows into the Forth. In Roman times, there was probably a natural harbour here. One suggested interpretation is that Cramond formed a chain of Lothian forts along with Carriden and Inveresk.

The fort was established around 140 AD during the building of the Antonine Wall, and remained in use until around 170 AD when the Romans retreated south to Hadrian's Wall.

When the Roman Emperor Septimius Severus began the last major Roman incursion into Scotland from 205 to 214 AD, the fort was reoccupied and enlarged. Throughout these periods of occupation a civilian settlement seems to have existed outside the fort, and some native occupation of the fort seems to have taken place after the time of Severus into the 5th century

Several Roman inscriptions have been found around Cramond and during the early Sub-Roman period.

== Cramond Roman Road ==
During the late 1970s and 1980s excavations were undertaken of the Roman road leading into the fort. It was found that it underwent four phases of construction/mortification during the Antonine and Severan periods.

Finds of medieval and post-medieval material from the road surface suggests that the road was used until the 17th or 18th century, when the area was incorporated into the designed landscape of Cramond House.

== Finds ==
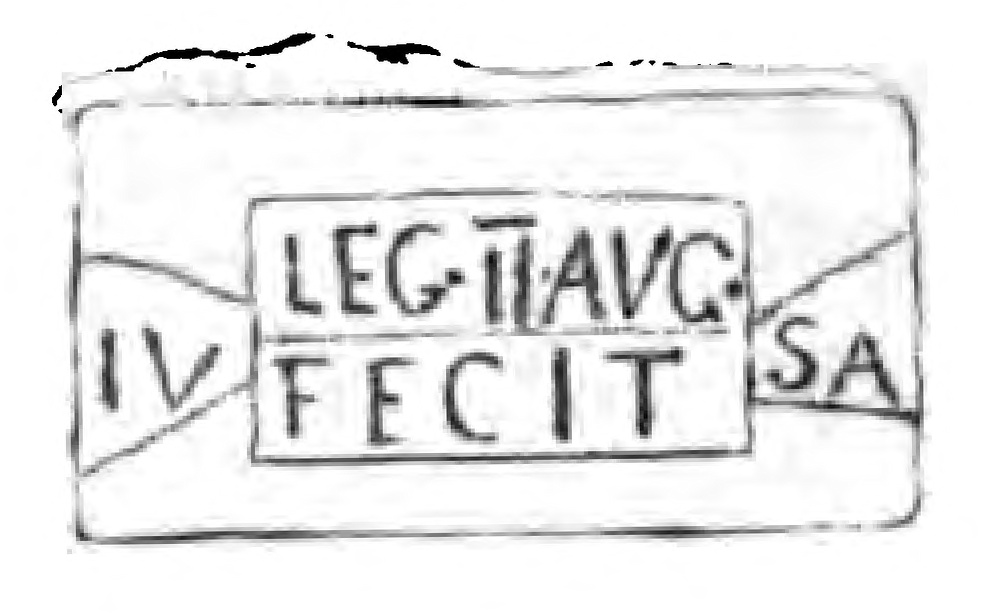
RIB 2137. Centurial stone of Julius Sa(…)

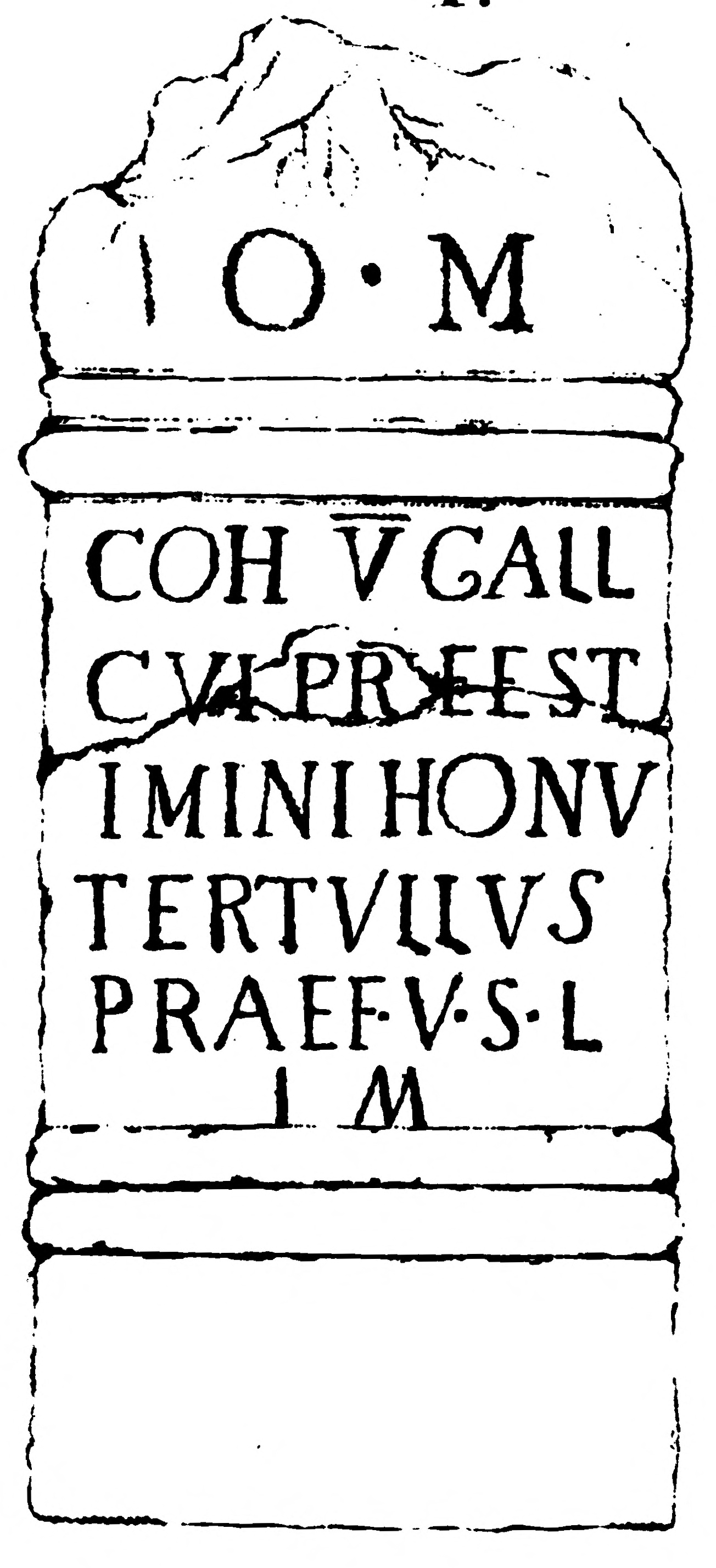
RIB 2134. Altar dedicated to Jupiter Optimus Maximus

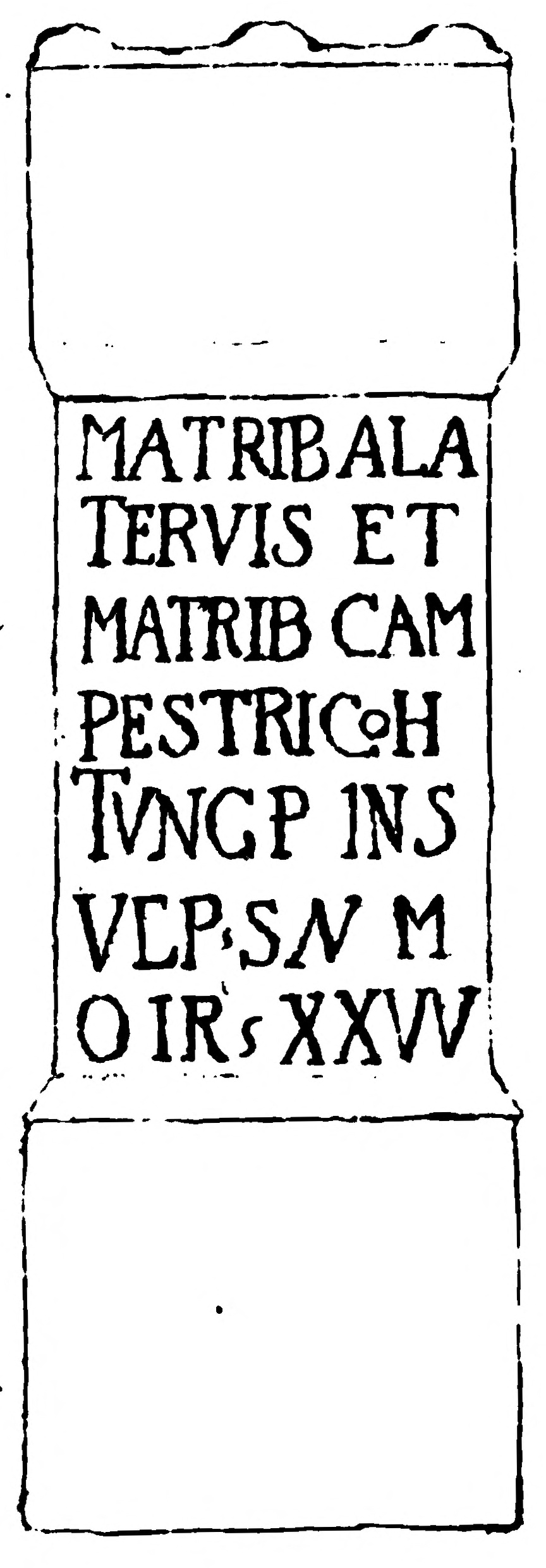
RIB 2135. Altar dedicated to the Mother Goddesses the Alatervae (?) and the Mother Goddesses of the Parade-ground

Roman finds from Cramond.

A stone altar, which was dug up a few hundred years ago in the grounds of Cramond House, was originally erected by a cohort of Tungrians (either first or second) and was dedicated to "the Alatervan Mothers and the Mothers of the Parade-ground" (Latin: Matres Alatervae et Matres Campestres). Early antiquarians interpreted this as referring to the place where the stone was found, and drew from it the conclusion that the Roman name of Cramond was "Alaterva". This idea is no longer accepted among scholars, and "Alatervae" is now believed to be an epithet attached to the Matronae, following a practice found elsewhere in the empire. It is thought that Cramond may be the "Rumabo" listed in the 7th-century Ravenna Cosmography – the original form of the name perhaps being "Carumabo".

Other stones found at the fort include a centurial stone of Legio II Augusta, and an altar "To Jupiter Optimus Maximus" erected by the fifth cohort of Gauls.

The discovery of a silver sword pendant indicates that a high-ranking beneficiarius was at the fort at some point.

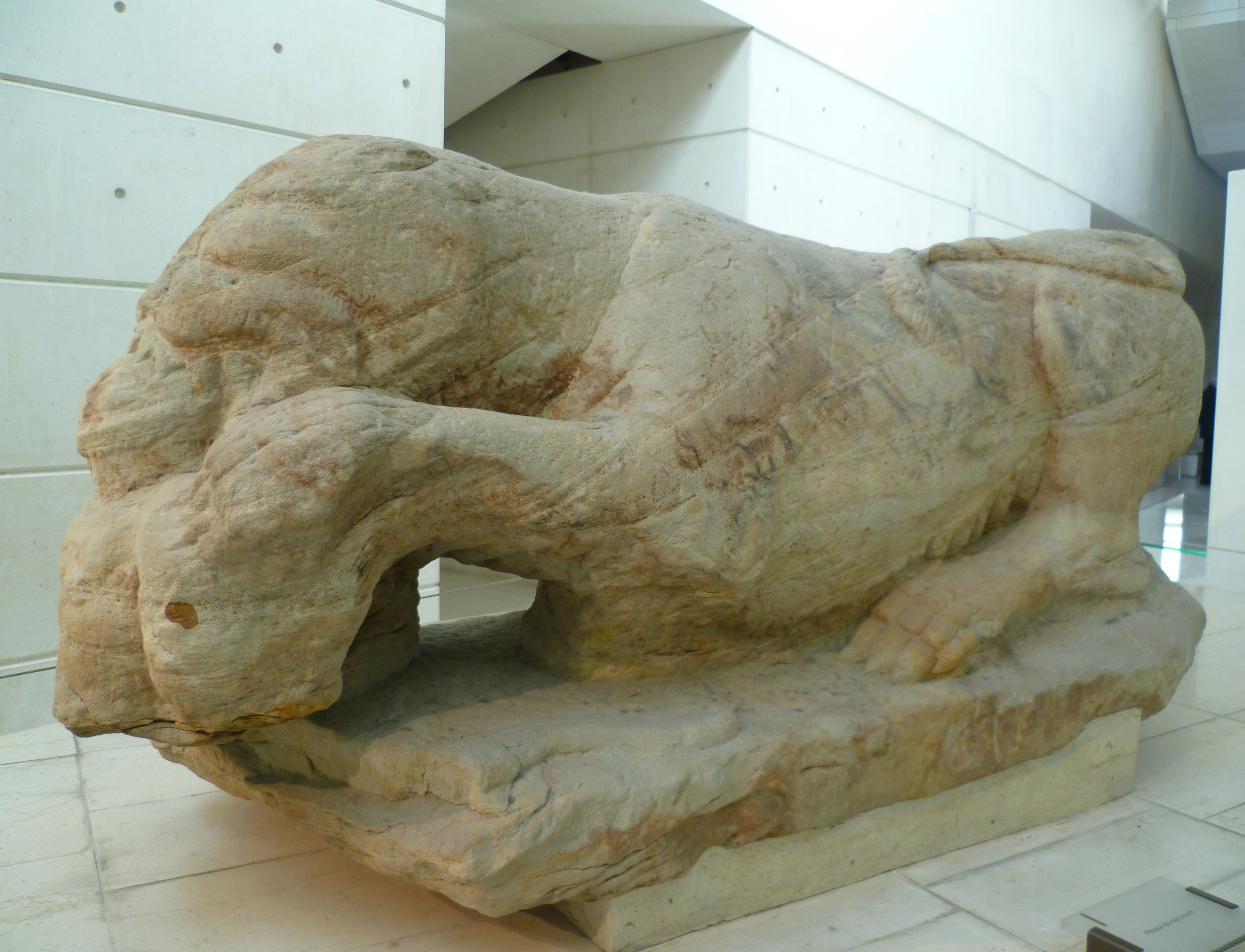
The Cramond Lioness, now in the National Museum of Scotland, is carved from a single block of stone.

The most famous sculpture is the Cramond Lioness recovered from the mouth of the River Almond in 1997. The sculpture, in a non-local white sandstone, shows a lioness devouring her prey, a naked bearded male torso. The sculpture was probably part of a large tomb monument of an important Roman officer, perhaps the fort commander or an important dignitary.

== The site today ==
The ground plan of part of the fort is laid out in an area of open parkland. Here one can see the headquarters building, granaries and a workshop, together with other buildings, restored in outline. Information panels at the site link the findings of the last 50 years of excavations, and recreate life in the former Roman headquarters and bathhouse. However, some parts of the fort and associated structures are located under some of the more modern buildings in the village. These structures are periodically uncovered when development work is required, for example, excavations in 1998 and 2001 before the construction of an extension to the Kirk Hall, which led to the discovery of the defensive ditches around, and the road into, the fort.

Since 2000 there have been plans to turn the Roman remains at Cramond into a tourist attraction. The plans include a visitor centre and museum, housing most of the Roman artefacts discovered in the area over the years, including the Cramond Lioness.

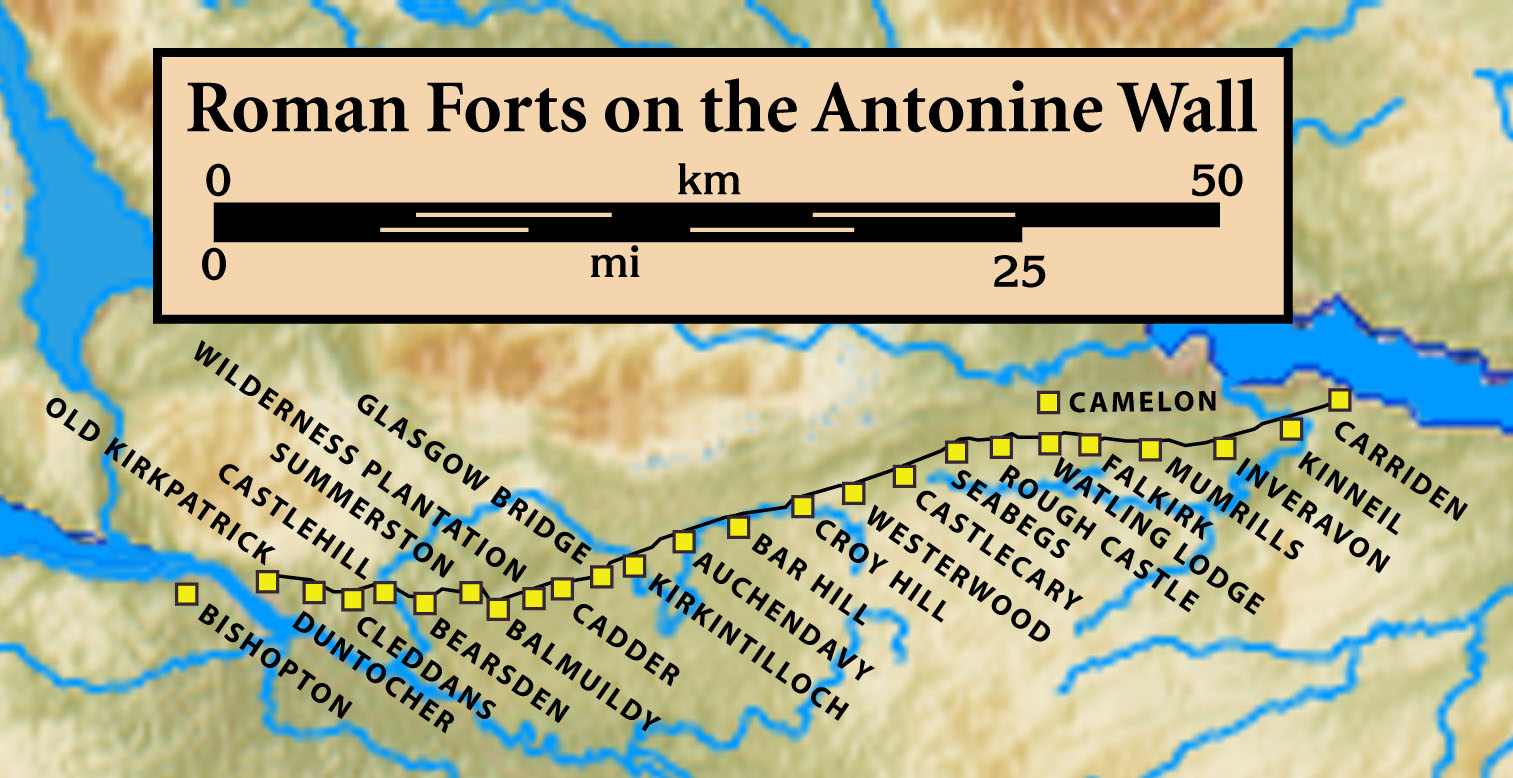
Forts and Fortlets associated with the Antonine Wall from west to east: Bishopton, Old Kilpatrick, Duntocher, Cleddans, Castlehill, Bearsden, Summerston, Balmuildy, Wilderness Plantation, Cadder, Glasgow Bridge, Kirkintilloch, Auchendavy, Bar Hill, Croy Hill, Westerwood, Castlecary, Seabegs, Rough Castle, Camelon, Watling Lodge, Falkirk, Mumrills, Inveravon, Kinneil, Carriden

== Mesolithic Site ==
Stone tools have been recovered from the fort from the Mesolithic period by archaeologists and there is a Mesolithic site just to the north from the Late Mesolithic period in Scotland (dated to 8600–8400 BC). This has led archaeologists to conclude the fort was built over a Mesolithic site or sites.
