= Carriden House =

Historic site in Bo'ness, Falkirk, Scotland

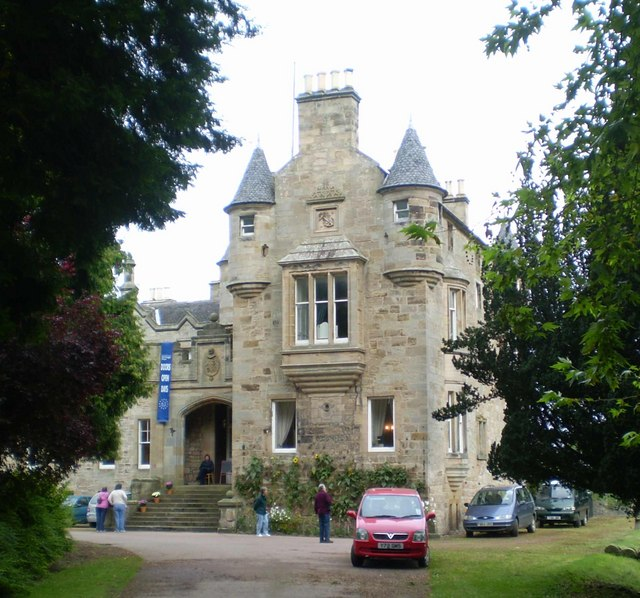
- South front of Carriden House

- Carriden House within Falkirk council area
- 56°00′38″N 3°33′55″W
- Location: Bo'ness, Falkirk

History
- Built: 1602
- Built for: John Hamilton of Letterick

Listed Building – Category A
- Designated: 25 November 1980
- Reference no.: LB22339

Carriden House is a 14,041 square feet (1,304.5 m^{2}) mansion in the parish of Bo'ness and Carriden, in the Falkirk council area, east central Scotland. It is located on the Antonine Wall 2.5 kilometres (1.6 mi) east of Bo'ness, and 4 kilometres (2.5 mi) northeast of Linlithgow, in the former county of West Lothian. The earliest part of the house is an early 17th-century tower house, which was extended in the 17th and 19th centuries. Carriden House is protected as a category A listed building.

== Etymology of name ==
Carriden is etymologically a Cumbric name. The first element is agreed to be *kair 'fortification'. The second element is more doubtful, but seems fairly likely to be the same regional name Eidyn that also appears in Edinburgh.

== History ==
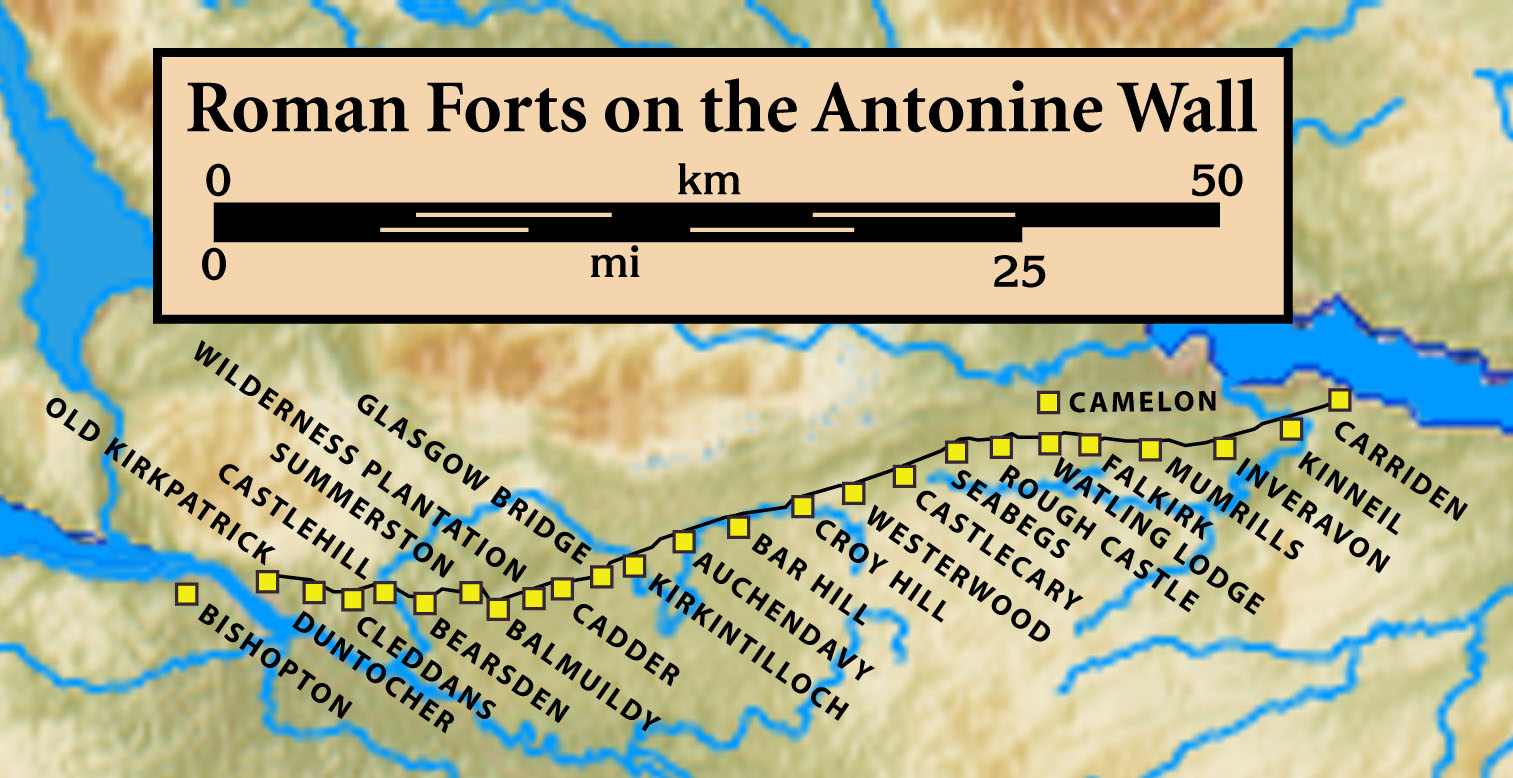
Forts and Fortlets associated with the Antonine Wall from west to east: Bishopton, Old Kilpatrick, Duntocher, Cleddans, Castlehill, Bearsden, Summerston, Balmuildy, Wilderness Plantation, Cadder, Glasgow Bridge, Kirkintilloch, Auchendavy, Bar Hill, Croy Hill, Westerwood, Castlecary, Seabegs, Rough Castle, Camelon, Watling Lodge, Falkirk, Mumrills, Inveravon, Kinneil, Carriden

Carriden House is located west of the site of an Antonine Roman fort. This formed the eastern end of the Antonine Wall. It is the only Antonine Fort whose Latin name, Veluniate, is known. A centurion's stone was reported as built into the house, according to Sir George Macdonald who wrote about it. Finds from the fort include some window fragments. One suggested interpretation is that Carriden formed a chain of Lothian forts along with Cramond and Inveresk. A tower probably stood on this site in the 16th century, and this was rebuilt or replaced in 1602 by John Hamilton of Lettrick. The tower was purchased later in the 17th century by the Mylne family, a prominent dynasty of masons and architects, and a west wing was added by Alexander Mylne. During the 18th century the house had many owners, and landscaping works were carried out in the grounds.

In 1814, the house was bought by Admiral Sir George Johnstone Hope (1767–1818), a veteran naval officer. His son Sir James Hope (1808–1881) made further alterations to the building, and also established the estate village of Muirhouses. The estate changed hands several more times, and by the 1970s was owned by the South of Scotland Electricity Board. Demolition was contemplated, to allow the building of a new power station on the site. This proposal was rejected and the house fell into disrepair. It the latter part of the 20th century the house was purchased from the SSEB by the Barkhouse family and restored as a private residence. The house has since undergone further renovation and modernisation, and continues to be a private family residence.

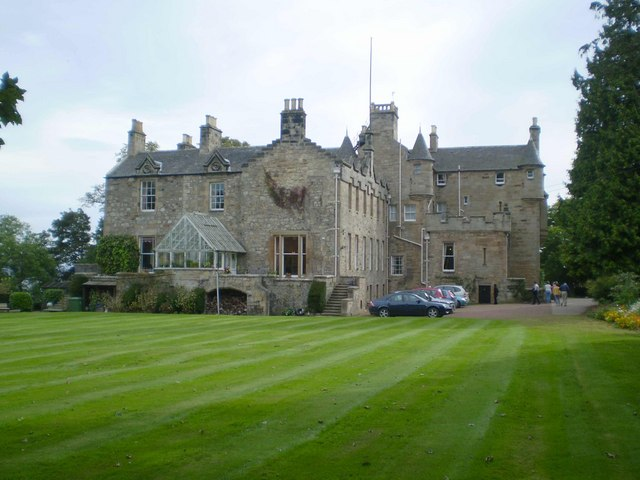
Carriden House from the west

== Description ==
The house is on an L-plan, and comprises the original tower house and the 17th-century wing. The tower house, dated 1602, is of three storeys and was remodelled in the 19th century. The two-storey wing added by Alexander Mylne is to the west, and bears a 1682 date stone. The study on the first floor has a 17th-century plaster ceiling described as "particularly exceptional". The porch in the angle of the L is also a 19th-century addition.
