= Croy Hill =

Coordinates: 55.9651°N 4.0308°W

- Croy Hill Fort
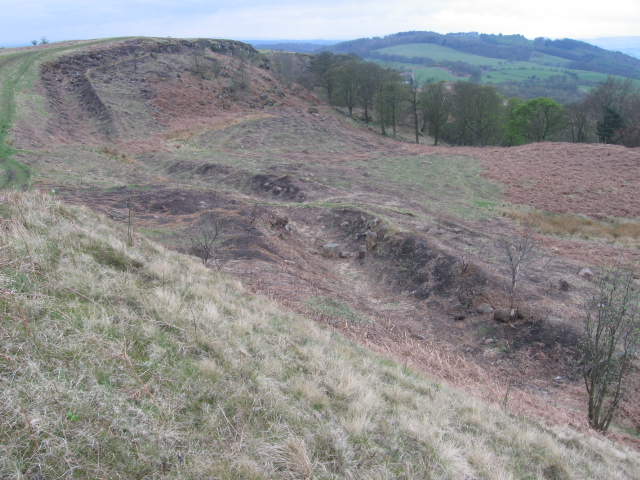
- Antonine Wall at Croy Hill
- Interactive map of Croy Hill
- Location: North Lanarkshire, Scotland

History
- Built: Antoninus Pius

Site notes
- Excavation dates: 1890-1891, 1920, 1931, 1935, 1975–1978
- Archaeologists: Alexander Park, George Macdonald, William Hanson

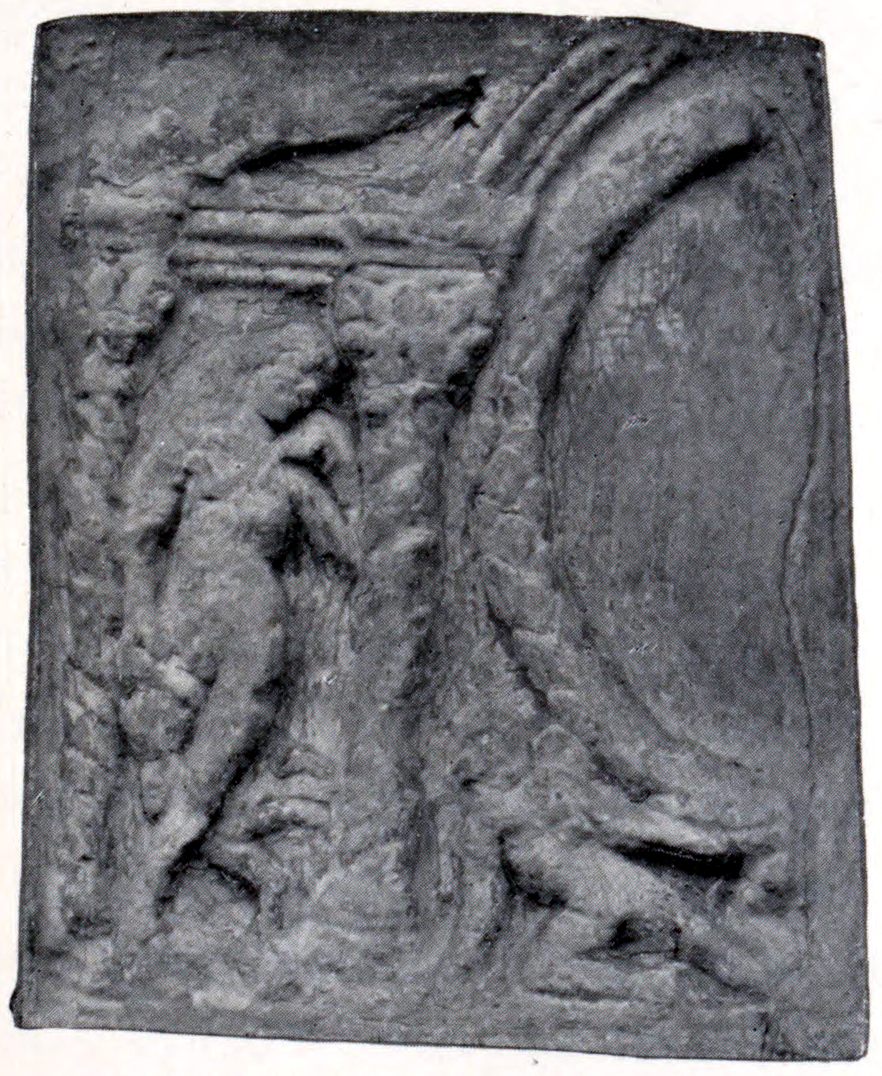
RIB 2155. Building inscription of the Sixth Legion. George MacDonald calls in no. 20 in the 2nd edition of his book The Roman Wall in Scotland. It has been scanned and a video produced.

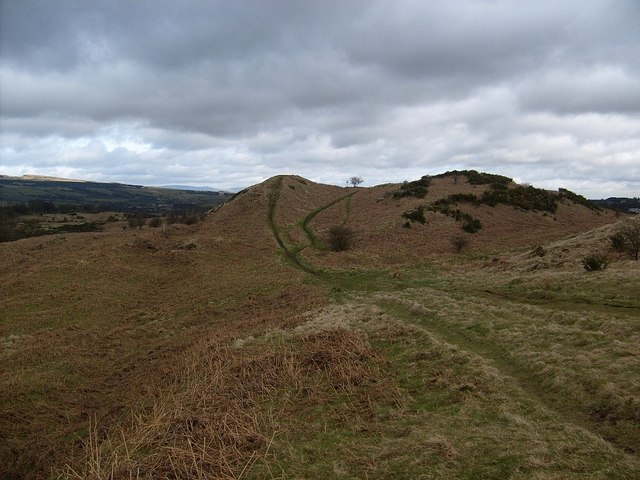
Twin Peaks on Croy Hill

Croy Hill was a Roman fort, fortlet, and probable temporary camp on the Antonine Wall, near Croy, to the north east of the village in Scotland. Two communication platforms known as ‘expansions’ can be seen to the west of the fortlet. Alexander Park excavated the site in 1890-1891. Sir George Macdonald wrote about his excavation of the site which occurred in 1920, 1931, and 1935. At Croy Hill, the ditch in front of the rampart was not excavated by the Romans. It is likely that hard basalt and dolerite of the hill was virtually impossible to shape with Roman tools. This is the only place along the Wall where the ditch wasn't dug. There is a bath house just outside one fort. A video reconstruction of the site has been produced.

At Croy Hill three religious objects have been found: one, as fragments of a relief of Jupiter Dolichenus; a second, an altar dedicated to Nymphs; and a third, identified as an altar to Mars. Other artefacts found include a bronze arm purse, a storage jar filled with ashes, and a fragment of "face mask" jar. These items are now kept in the Hunterian Museum, Glasgow along with others like the altar found at Castlecary. Only four coins have been discovered near the fort and an axe was also found near the hill. A gravestone was discovered; it shows a soldier with other men, perhaps his sons, at his side. It has been scanned and a video produced.

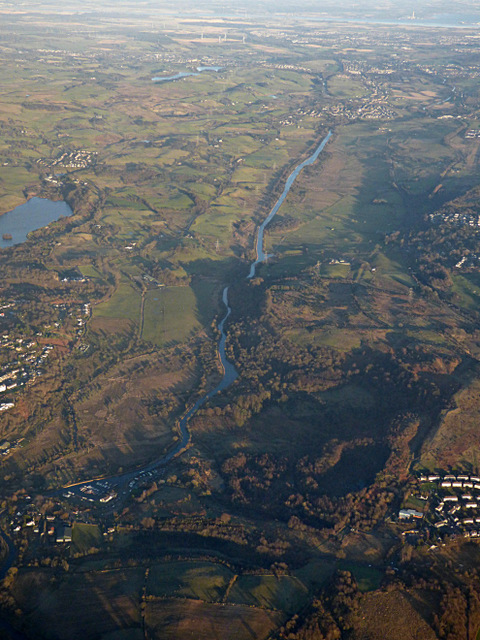
The Forth and Clyde Canal from the air. Croy Hill (between Auchinstarry marina and Croy) towards Longannet Power Station on the Firth of Forth

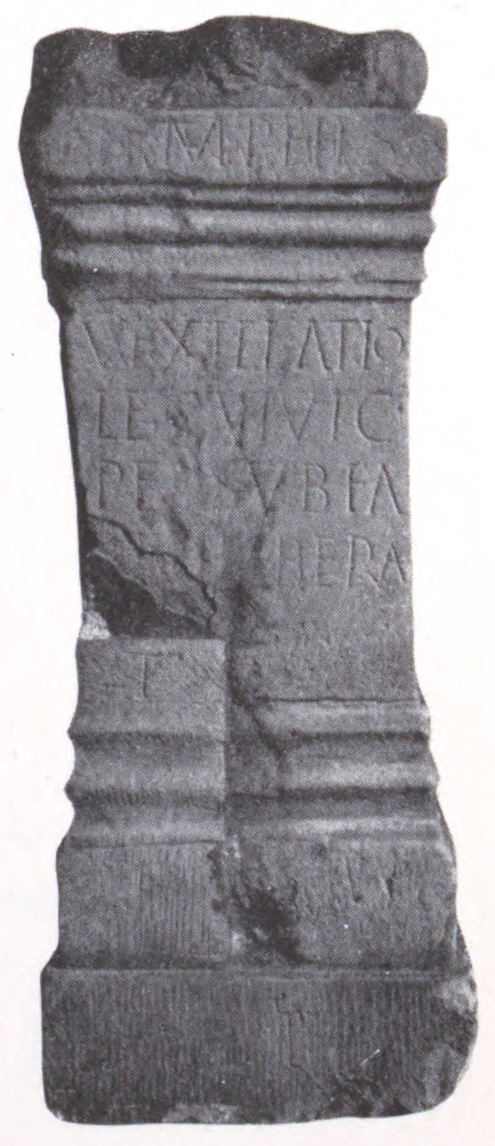
RIB 2160. Altar dedicated to the Nymphs, Croy Hill. It has been scanned and a video produced.

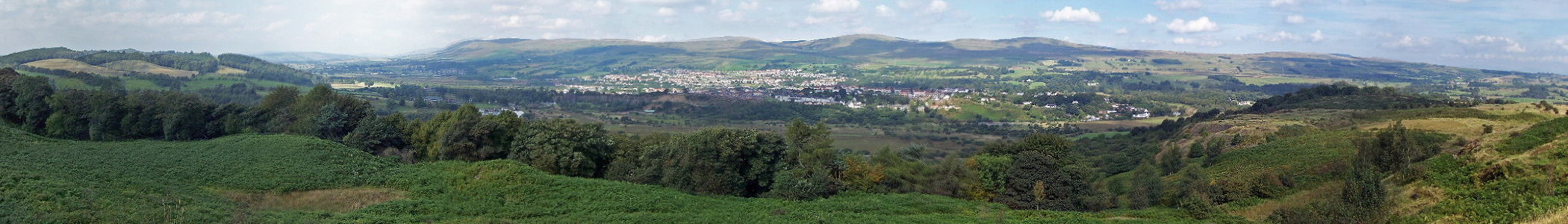
Kilsyth from Croy Hill

Croy hill's neighbouring forts were Barr Hill to the west and Westerwood to the east. The larger Roman forts of which this was not one had a nominal cohort of 1000 men but probably sheltered women and children as well although the troops were not allowed to marry. There is likely too to have been large communities of civilians around the site.

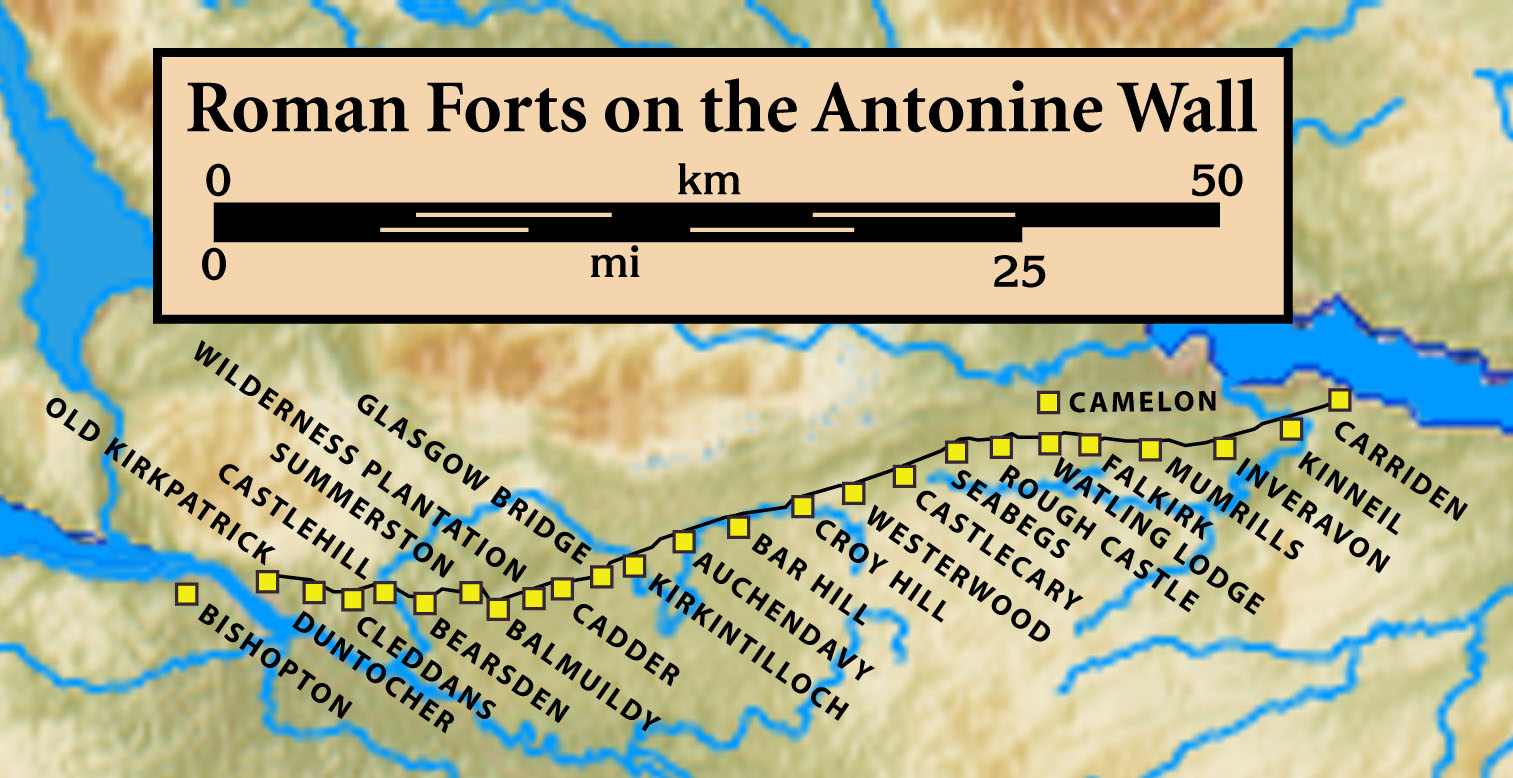
Forts and Fortlets associated with the Antonine Wall from west to east: Bishopton, Old Kilpatrick, Duntocher, Cleddans, Castlehill, Bearsden, Summerston, Balmuildy, Wilderness Plantation, Cadder, Glasgow Bridge, Kirkintilloch, Auchendavy, Bar Hill, Croy Hill, Westerwood, Castlecary, Seabegs, Rough Castle, Camelon, Watling Lodge, Falkirk, Mumrills, Inveravon, Kinneil, Carriden
