= Old Kilpatrick =

Village in West Dunbartonshire, Scotland

Coordinates: 55.9250°N 4.4593°W

Old Kilpatrick ( Clydebank ): Scottish Gaelic: Cille Phàdraig; Scots: Auld Kilpaitrick
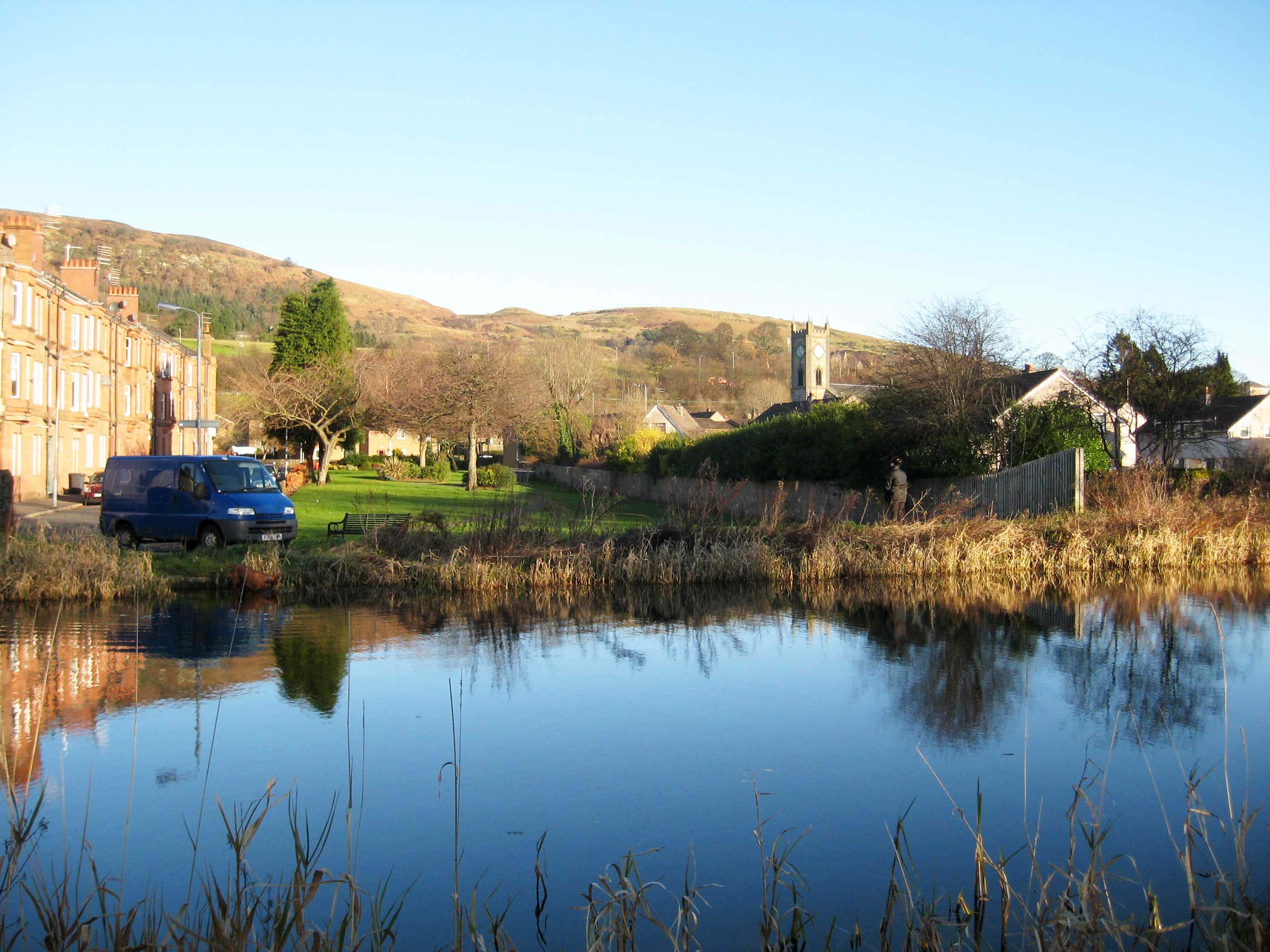
- Old Kilpatrick and the Kilpatrick Hills, seen across the Forth and Clyde Canal

- Location within West Dunbartonshire
- Population: 4,470 (2020)
- OS grid reference: NS463729
  - Edinburgh: 65.4 miles
  - London: 425.4 miles
- Council area: West Dunbartonshire
- Lieutenancy area: Dunbartonshire
- Country: Scotland
- Sovereign state: United Kingdom
- Post town: Glasgow
- Postcode district: G60
- Dialling code: 01389
- Police: Scotland
- Fire: Scottish
- Ambulance: Scottish
- UK Parliament: West Dunbartonshire
- Scottish Parliament: Clydebank and Milngavie

Old Kilpatrick (Scots: Auld Kilpaitrick, Scottish Gaelic: Cille Phàdraig meaning "Patrick's church") is a village in West Dunbartonshire, Scotland. The name Old Kilpatrick is said to be derived from St. Patrick ostensibly being born here. It has an estimated population of 4,820. It belonged to the parish of Old Kilpatrick which itself was only a few thousand people strong.

The Forth and Clyde Canal separates Old Kilpatrick from the north bank of the River Clyde which is just a few metres beyond it to the south. The village is about three miles (five kilometres) west of Clydebank, on the road west to Dumbarton where some say the river becomes the Firth of Clyde. The Great Western Road runs through the village whose immediate western neighbour, on the road and the canal, is Bowling, where the Forth and Clyde Canal meets the river. The modern A82 road runs to the north, between the village and the foot of the Kilpatrick Hills. In the 19th century it was described as being essentially a single street. It's possible the birthplace of Saint Patrick was near Old Kilpatrick.

== Roman fort ==
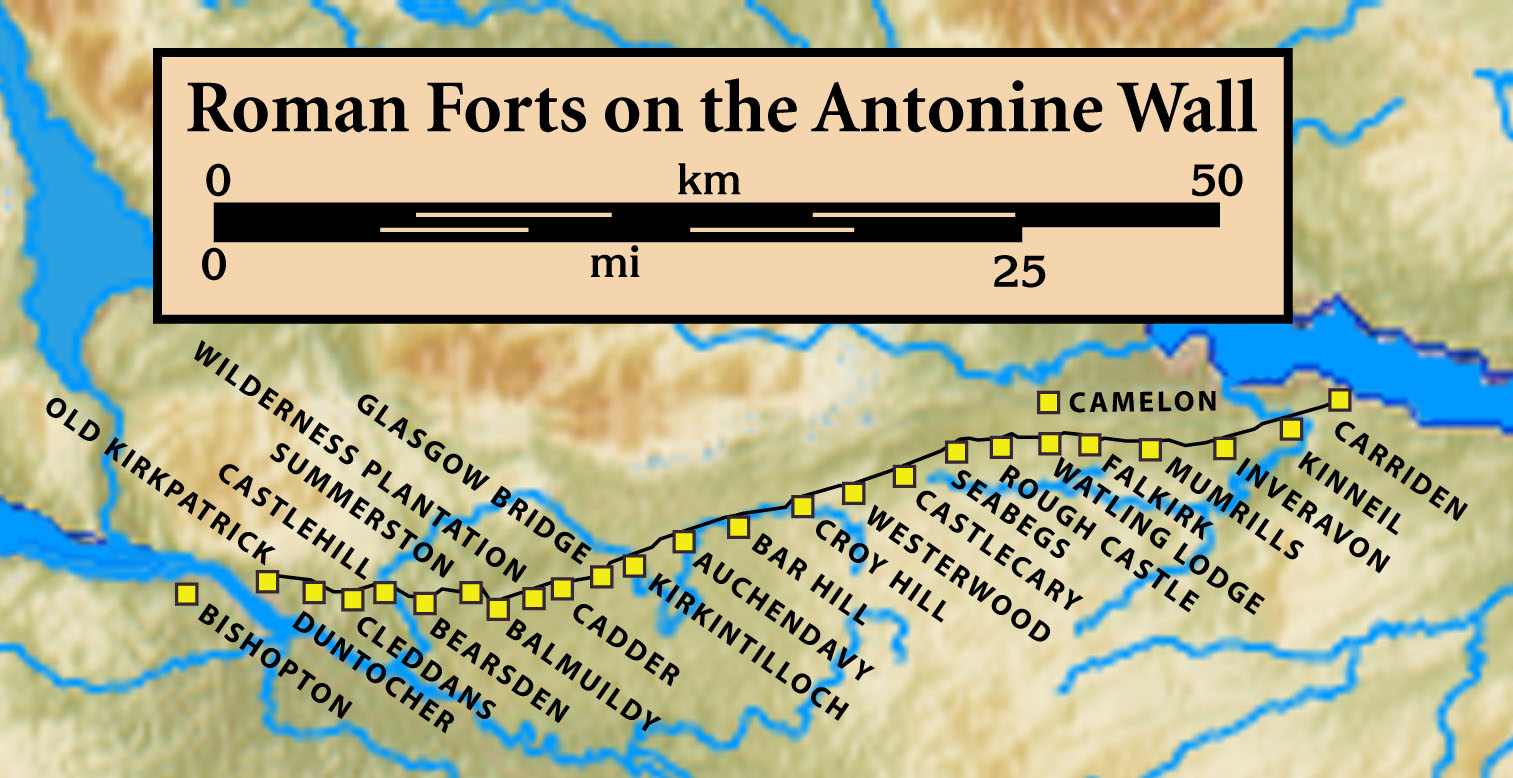
Forts and Fortlets associated with the Antonine Wall from west to east: Bishopton, Old Kilpatrick, Duntocher, Cleddans, Castlehill, Bearsden, Summerston, Balmuildy, Wilderness Plantation, Cadder, Glasgow Bridge, Kirkintilloch, Auchendavy, Bar Hill, Croy Hill, Westerwood, Castlecary, Seabegs, Rough Castle, Camelon, Watling Lodge, Falkirk, Mumrills, Inveravon, Kinneil, Carriden

The western end of the Antonine Wall is at Old Kilpatrick; the eastern end, 59 km distant, is at Bridgeness, to the east in Bo'ness on the Firth of Forth. The route was surveyed during the 18th century, and traced to the Chapel Hill, where various Roman artefacts were found. Lottery funding has been assigned to producing replica distance markers; the West Dunbartonshire marker is to be placed at Old Kilpatrick.

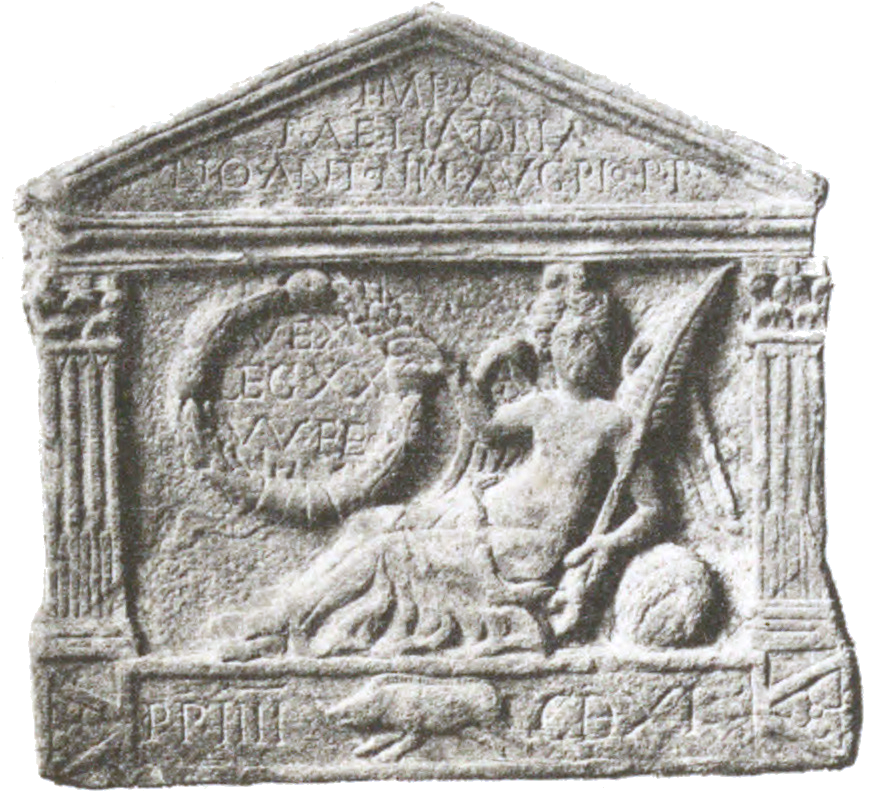
RIB 2208. Distance Slab of the Twentieth Legion. It possibly marked the western end of the wall as The Bridgeness Slab may have marked the eastern end. It has been scanned and a video produced.

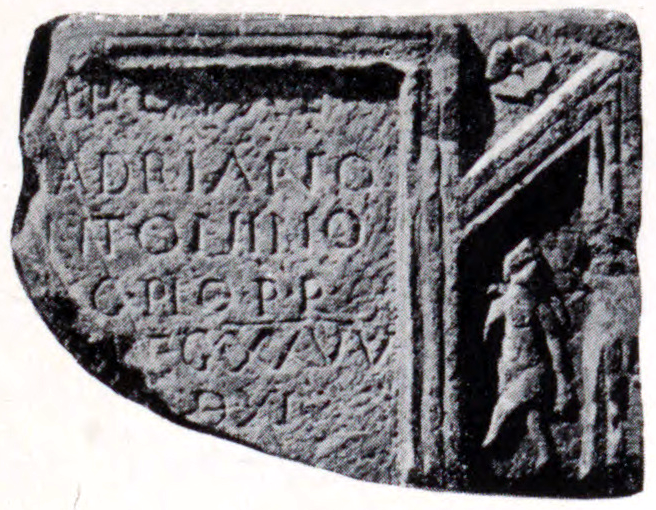
RIB 2206. Distance Slab of the Twentieth Legion Valeria Victrix It was found towards the west of the wall and is often associated with Old Kilpatrick. George MacDonald calls in no. 16 in the 2nd edition of his book The Roman Wall in Scotland. It has been scanned and a video produced.

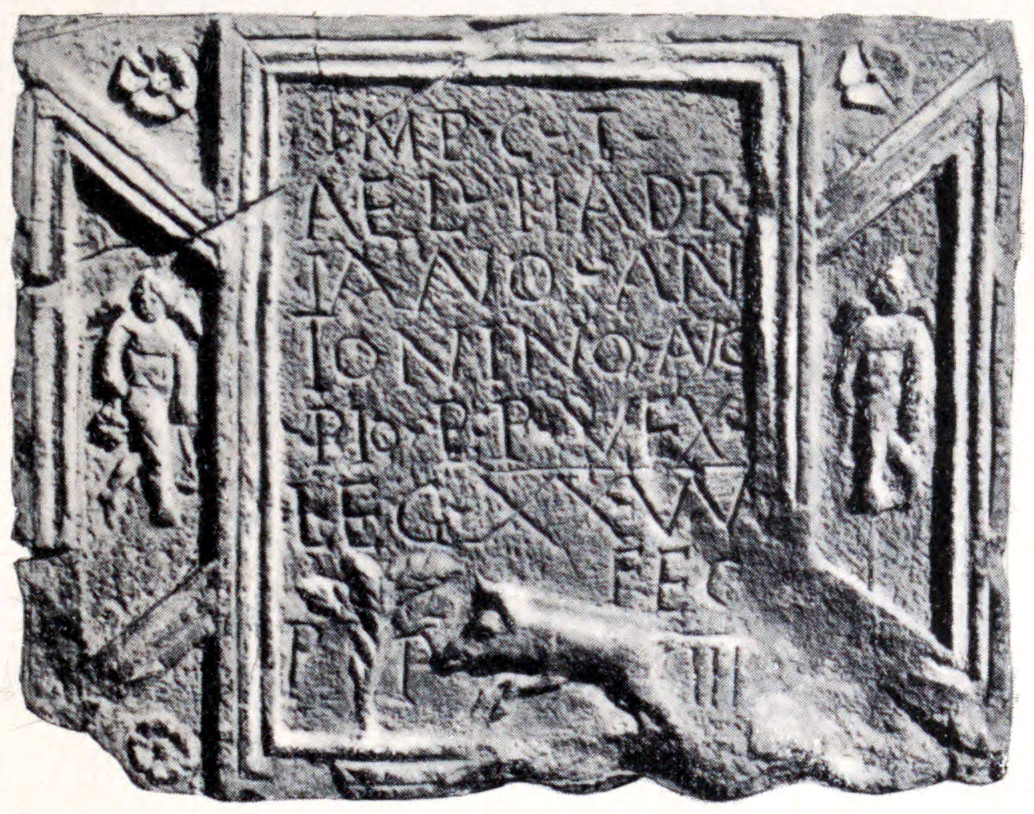
RIB 2198. Distance Slab of the Twentieth Legion It was found near Cleddans. George MacDonald calls in no. 10 in the 2nd edition of his book The Roman Wall in Scotland. It was destroyed in the Great Chicago Fire.

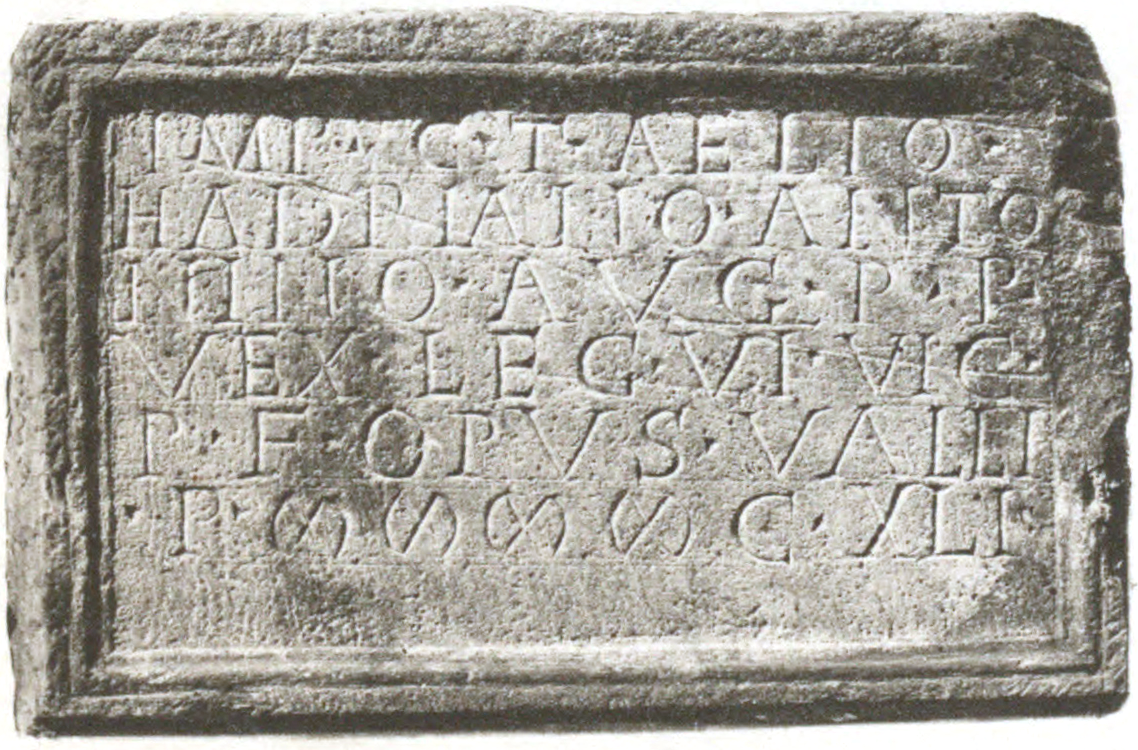
RIB 2205. Distance Slab of the Sixth Legion It has been scanned and a video produced.

In 1790, when the Forth and Clyde Canal was being constructed, the remains of a bathhouse were discovered. In 1913, the foundations of the fort, which had been conjectured as being in the vicinity, were confirmed. In 1923, during redevelopment of the area, significant archaeology was undertaken which established the size and nature of the Roman Fort. The fort, built around 81 AD, occupied an area of about four acres and was enclosed by an outer defensive wall. If the date is correct, it shows that the fort preceded the Antonine Wall by some sixty years. Internally, buildings discovered included a praetorium (headquarters), barracks and a granary. A video reconstruction of the site has been produced. Sir George Macdonald also wrote about the excavations. Major development precluded further significant excavation, and nothing is visible of the remains today; the remains lie beneath the houses of Gavinburn Gardens to the east, a large commercial building to the west and the A814 road to the north. Finds from Old Kilpatrick include several distance slabs. One distance slab by the Twentieth Legion is known to have been completed before 1684. It depicts Victory with a palm-branch in one hand and a garland in the other. It was found at Ferrydyke on the Clyde's northern bank and records the completion of 4411 feet; the last 3 Roman numerals are the same as the remaining ones on the other damaged distance slab (RIB 2206).

The slabs along with many other finds from Old Kilpatrick are now kept at the Hunterian Museum in Glasgow. For example, 19 coins have been found as well as a beaker. On 3 December 1969 a Roman votive altar was found at Old Kilpatrick. It has been scanned and a video produced. The inscription mentions the First Cohort of Baetasians, previously known to have been at Bar Hill, and also a centurion from The First Legion (Italica).

== Medieval artefacts ==
Old Kilpatrick was one of the original parishes in medieval Scotland. The current (1812) church is built on the site of the 12th century church. One known artefact, a remnant of the previous medieval church, a font is currently on display in the local museum.

Unusually in this part of Clydeside two examples of the Govan School of sculpture, dated to the Viking period, have been found. The Old Kilpatrick Cross (in fact the shaft of a cross) discovered in 1886 when the Auchentorlie tomb was opened for the burial of Andrew Buchanan. That cross is now in storage in Glasgow Museums

Another stone, locally known as the Sandyford Cross, almost 3 metres in height was believed to be the execution place of a woman tried for witchcraft in the late 17th century. It was used as a bridge across the Dalnottar burn before being taken into the home of Robert Donald at Mountblow. From there it transferred to Glasgow Corporation in the 19th century and from there to the collection at Kelvingrove where it remains in storage

== Later history ==
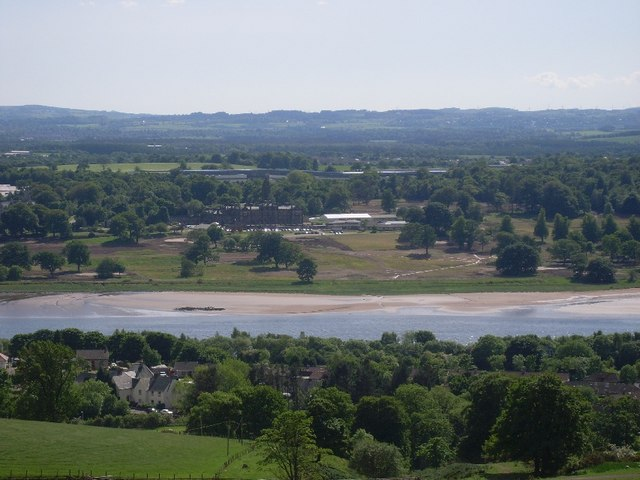
View looking south from the Kilpatrick Hills over the houses of Old Kilpatrick to the River Clyde, with Erskine Hospital visible on the other side of the Clyde

The parish system was introduced to Scotland in the 13th century. In about 1227, the church and lands of Kilpatrick were given to Paisley Abbey by Maldowen, Earl of Lennox. The parish remained under the supervision of the Abbey until the Reformation in 1560.

At the Dissolution, the Church property fell into the possession of Lord Sempill. Eventually the lands were conferred on Claude Hamilton (a boy of ten), founder of the Abercorn family. His son James Hamilton was created Lord Abercorn on 5 April 1603, then on 10 July 1606 he was made Earl of Abercorn and Lord of Paisley, Hamilton, Mountcastell and Kilpatrick.

Kilpatrick was split into two parishes – Old (Wester or West) and New Kilpatrick (also known as Easter or East) by an Act of Parliament on 16 February 1649. This division is unusual because this was a split of both the ecclesiastical and civil parishes and the wealth and stipend of the original parish was shared between the two new parishes. It was more common for new parishes to have "daughter" status, with wealth retained by the central, or cathedral church.

Old Kilpatrick was created a Burgh of barony in 1697. Its population tripled between 1755 and 1821 as the spinning and weaving industries developed. By 1831 the population was 5,800. From 1906 to 1931, Old Kilpatrick was the site of the Napier and Miller shipyard.

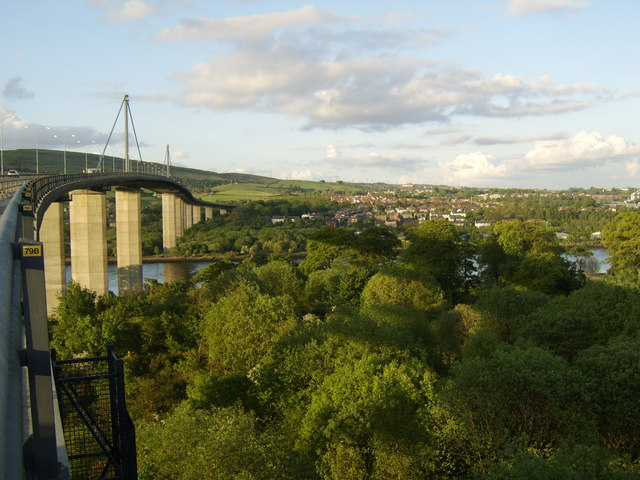
The River Clyde and Old Kilpatrick from the Erskine Bridge

Today, the north end of the Erskine Bridge, which replaced the Erskine Ferry, lands just above the village, and the village is served by Kilpatrick railway station on the North Clyde Line.

There are three public houses within Old Kilpatrick; The Twisted Thistle, The Ettrick and the Glen Lusset. The Twisted Thistle was previously known as the Telstar. After the closure of The Telstar, the building was renovated and reopened in 2014 as The Twisted Thistle.

There are two annual fêtes which are well attended. Also at the north end of Old Kilpatrick is the local school. Gavinburn Primary School (which was bombed in WW2) where they also have many fêtes annually.

The minerals edingtonite and thomsonite were first found at Old Kilpatrick.

In the early 1990s a large housing estate was constructed at the edge of Old Kilpatrick, the one estate was said to double the size of Old Kilpatrick.

The ancient graveyard surrounding the old parish church still has surviving gravestones from the 17th century. The current building dates from 1812 and is still in use as the local Church of Scotland parish church, now linked with neighbouring Bowling Parish Church.

The local Roman Catholic church is St Patrick's RC Church; the current parish priest is Rev William McGinley. A fire in August 2015 saw the RC congregation temporarily without a place to worship, taking up the kind offer of the nearby Church of Scotland congregation to use their building, a friendly act of ecumenism in part of Scotland traditionally torn by bigotry.

There are plans to develop a marine technology hub at the former Royal Navy oil refinery and a wooded community area near the village.

== Notable people ==
Many soldiers from Old Kilpatrick perished during the First World War.

- Chris Baillie, athlete
- Bobby Finan, footballer
- Colonel Andrew Geils, one time Commandant (interim Governor) of Van Diemen's Land (subsequently Tasmania) and owner of the nearby estate of Dumbuck is buried in the Parish churchyar d along with several other family members
- George Harcourt, society portrait painter
- Alexander Hart, one of the convicted Scottish Radicals
- James Leechman, Scottish advocate and judge
- Walter G Leechman, solicitor
- Daniel McLaughlin (1884-1970), survivor of the shipwreck Dundonald
- Ian Niall, or John McNeillie, author of The Wigtown Ploughman, was born here
- John Hammond Teacher (1869-1930) Professor of Pathology, Glasgow Infirmary
- This is one of several locations that it is suggested that Saint Patrick of Ireland was captured at and enslaved in Ireland in the 5th century.

== See also ==
- Bodinbo Island
- Donald's Quay
- St Patrick's Rock
