= Summerston =

Area of Glasgow, Scotland

Coordinates: 55.903603°N 4.288892°W

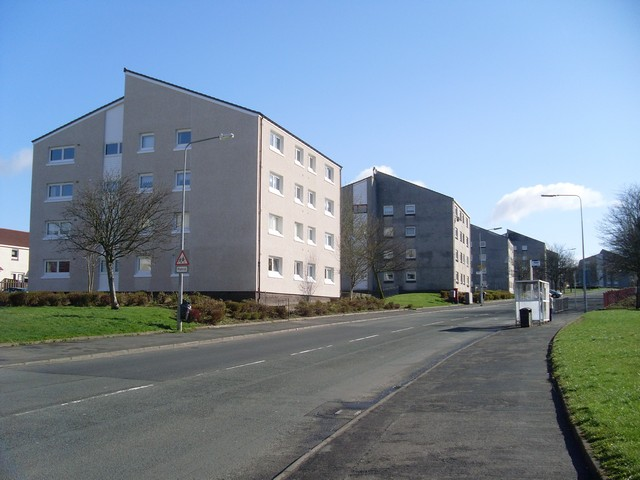
- Apartment blocks on Arrochar Street

- Location within Glasgow
- OS grid reference: NS570702
- Council area: Glasgow City Council
- Lieutenancy area: Glasgow
- Country: Scotland
- Sovereign state: United Kingdom
- Post town: GLASGOW
- Postcode district: G23
- Dialling code: 0141
- Police: Scotland
- Fire: Scottish
- Ambulance: Scottish
- UK Parliament: Glasgow North
- Scottish Parliament: Glasgow Maryhill and Springburn

Summerston is a residential area of Glasgow, Scotland. With most of the housing constructed in the 1970s, it is situated in the far north of the city and is considered to be part of the larger Maryhill district, but has a different postcode; other nearby neighbourhoods are Gilshochill to the south and Cadder to the south-east. With open farmland to the north-east, Summerston is separated from the southern parts of the town of Bearsden to the north-west by the River Kelvin and a golf course.

== Amenities ==
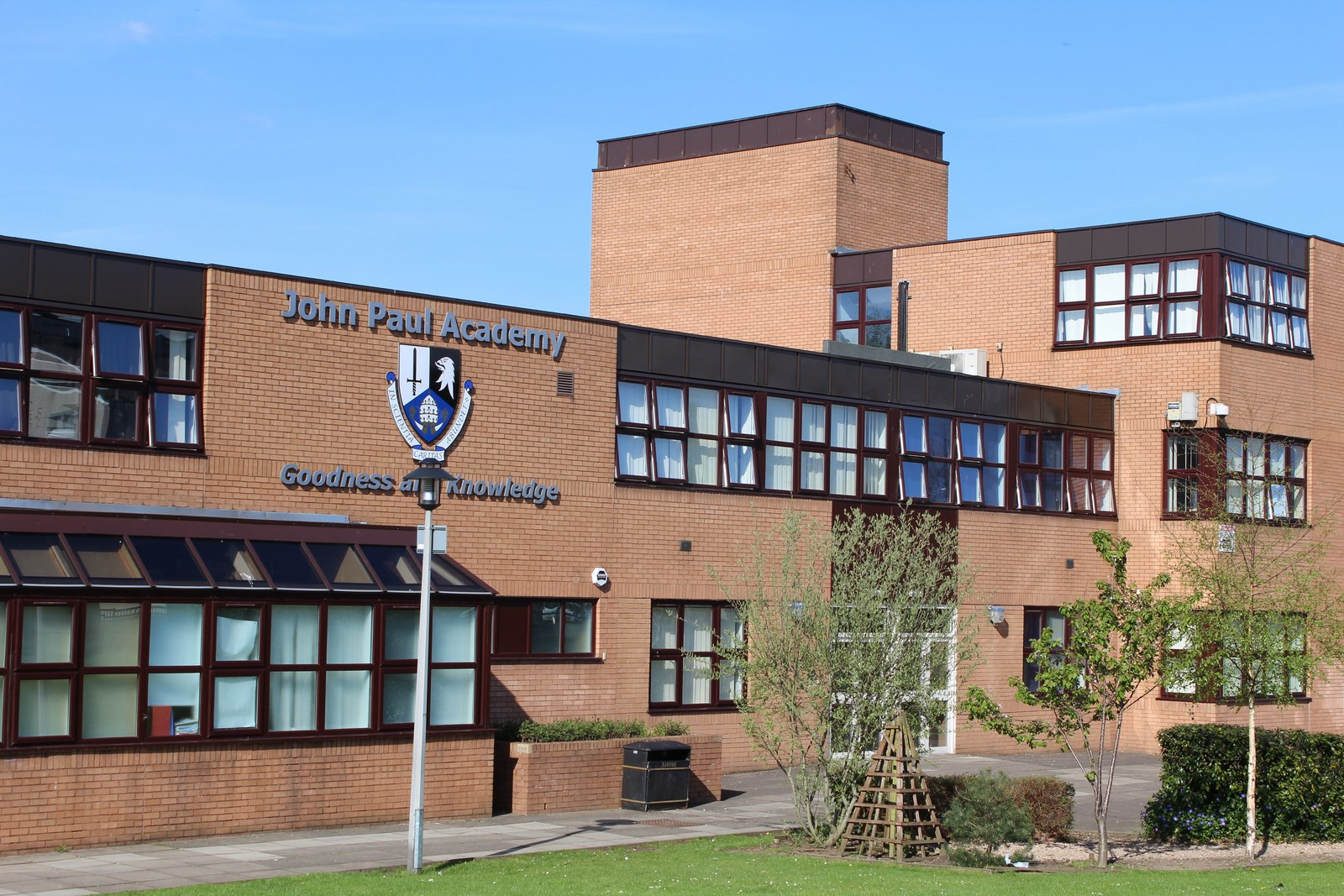
John Paul Academy

Summerston has a riding school run by UK charity Riding for the Disabled. The area is also home to St Blane's Primary and John Paul Academy.

The 4th Glasgow Scout Beaver Colony and Cub Scout Pack are based in Caldercuilt Primary School at 101 Invershiel Road. It is also home to Summerston Childcare which is the most popular Family Learning and Out of School centre in Summerston having had a waiting list for their classes since their opening in 1995. Maryhill Harriers running club meet at John Paul Academy as well as various other clubs together with a range of fitness class in the evening at the school. Summerston has several large shops, including an ASDA, also a chemist. There was previously a B&M Bargain, Poundstretchers store and a flooring shop they have subsequently been removed and building remodelled to make way for new shops rumoured to be a Iceland and a home bargains.

As of July 2021 the current shops are opened: Asda, Home Bargains, Gregg’s, Iceland.

There is an entrance to Maryhill Park from Summerston which contains tennis courts, a children's play area and walking paths.

The residential streets are mostly named after locations in the Highlands and Islands of Scotland, including obscure places such as Gorstan, Carbost, Tolsta, Ardessie, Loch Mullardoch and Milovaig.

== History ==
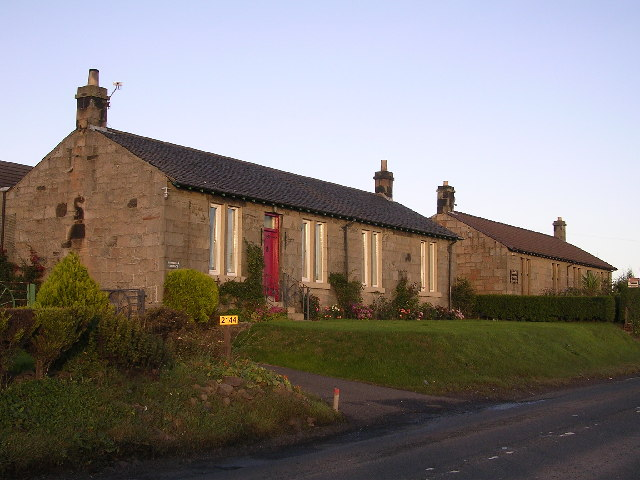
Summerston Cottages

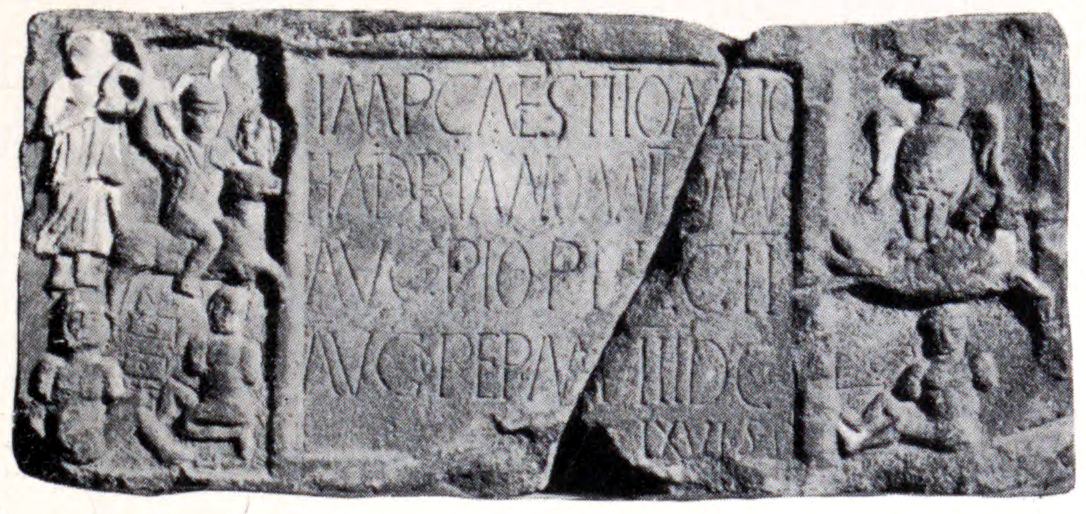
RIB 2193. Distance Slab of the Second Legion George MacDonald calls in no. 6 in the 2nd edition of his book The Roman Wall in Scotland. He says it was found near the farm at Summerston on the banks of the Kelvin. It has been scanned and a video produced.

The current Summerston railway station is about 1 1/2 miles (2.4 kilometres) south of the original one which was on the Kelvin Valley Railway. The original station was north and west of the River Kelvin, close to the Summerston Farm and Cottages and the site of a fortlet on the Antonine Wall. The fortlet was discovered from aerial observation in 1980. A temporary marching camp, south of the Kelvin, was found in 1978 also from the air. A sandstone distance slab was found at Summerston Farm before 1694. A video of scans taken from the stone has been produced.

The slab, reminiscent of The Bridgeness Slab, was made by the Second Legion and depicts a helmeted horseman and naked captives. It is now in the Hunterian Museum in Glasgow. The slab was probably originally painted with bright pigments. The colours were found using X-ray and laser technology. The gory slabs showed natives with bright red blood on their faces, bodies and legs. The neighbouring forts to this forlet were at Bearsden to the west and at Balmuildy to the east.

Another Summerston slab can be compared with one found near Castlehill. Both these similar slabs, like two others from Duntocher have two decorative pelta shields, one on either side of the slab. The horns of each shield are embellished with three rosettes on the Castlehill slab whereas the Summerton slab has these end in two griffins' heads.

The first, badly weathered, slab has four rosettes between the shields and the inscription. It was found in 1803 on Low Millochan farm. The farm, later called East Millichen, is near Summerston. It was built into a dovecot and records the building of 3666.5 paces of wall by the Sixth Legion. MacDonald describes the work as coarse and relates that some of the abbreviations are unusual. He suggests that it stood side-by-side with what he calls no. 6 (RIB 2193) at Summerston. On the similar Castlehill slab (RIB 2196) he suggests the stone-cutter has blundered and made a letter P where he should have a letter F (for Fidelis) on the fourth line. The Castlehill slab also records 3666.5 paces although the units used are a matter of ongoing research.

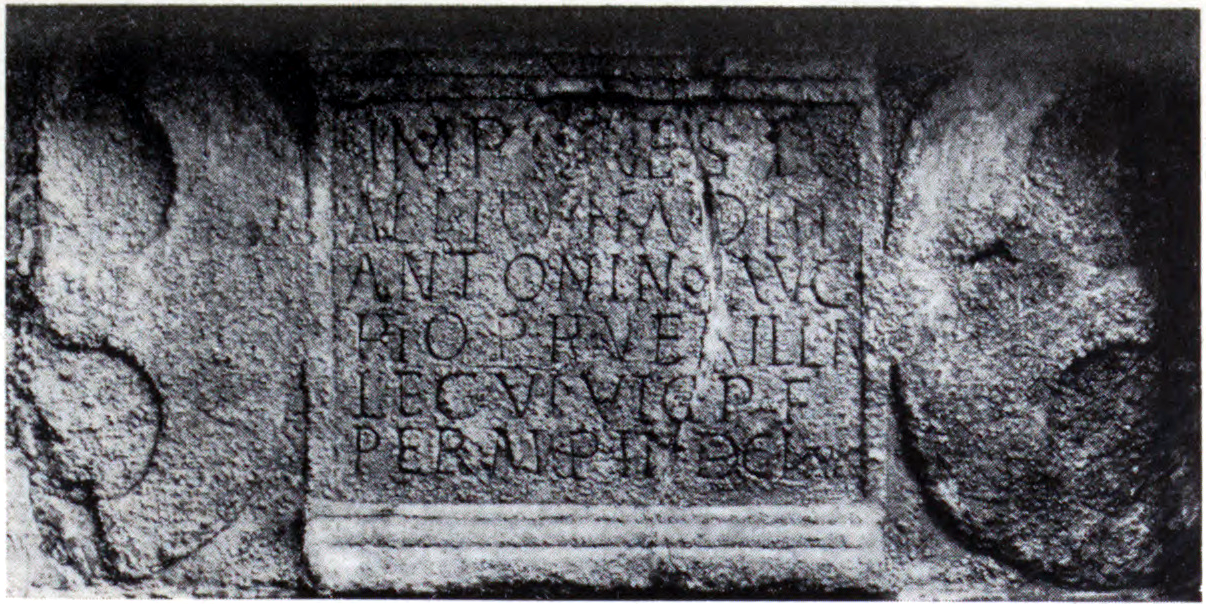
Weathered Distance Slab of the Sixth Legion. George MacDonald calls in no. 7 in the 2nd edition of his book The Roman Wall in Scotland. It was found on East Millichen Farm, Summerston. It has been scanned and a 3D model and a video have been produced.

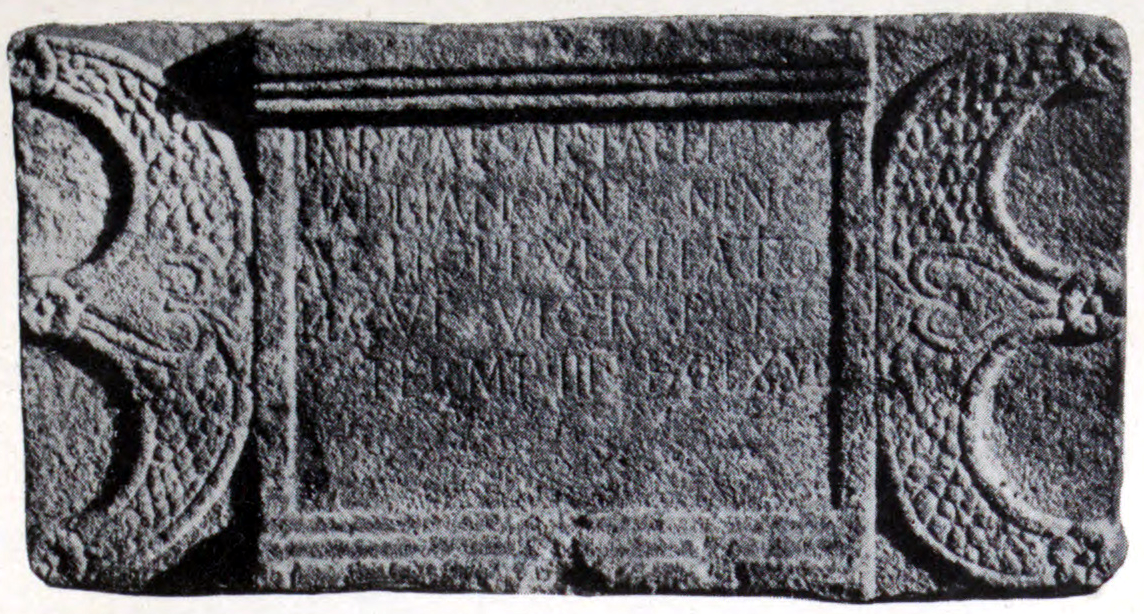
RIB 2196. Distance Slab of the Sixth Legion George MacDonald calls in no. 8 in the 2nd edition of his book The Roman Wall in Scotland and describes it as belonging to Castlehill or its neighbourhood.

There is some evidence of a Roman bridge over the Kelvin between Summerston and Balmuildy. Summerston was part of the parish of Strathblane. Ironstone and coal were historically mined in the area.

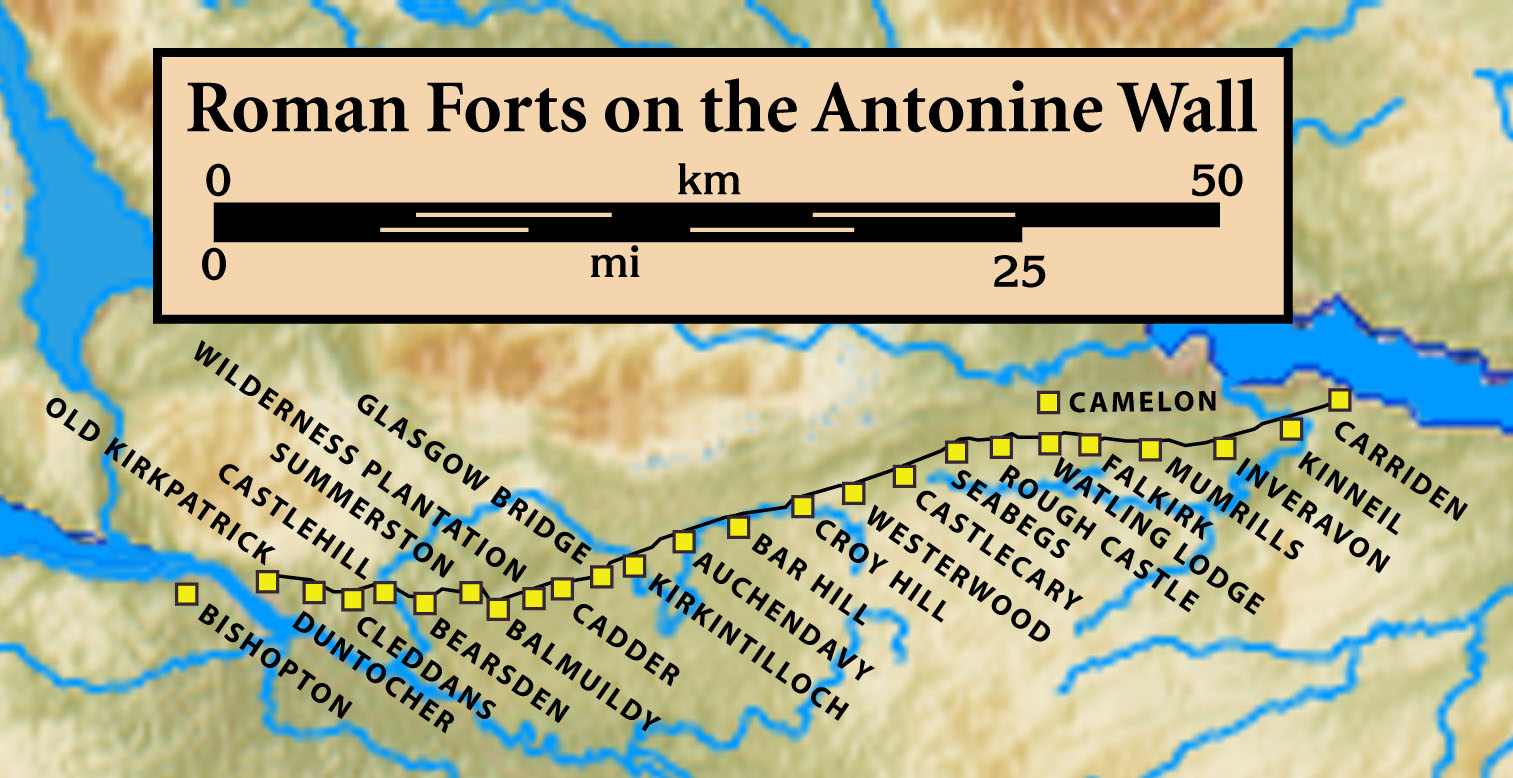
Forts and Fortlets associated with the Antonine Wall from west to east: Bishopton, Old Kilpatrick, Duntocher, Cleddans, Castlehill, Bearsden, Summerston, Balmuildy, Wilderness Plantation, Cadder, Glasgow Bridge, Kirkintilloch, Auchendavy, Bar Hill, Croy Hill, Westerwood, Castlecary, Seabegs, Rough Castle, Camelon, Watling Lodge, Falkirk, Mumrills, Inveravon, Kinneil, Carriden
