= Cleddans =

Roman fortlet on the Antonine Wall, Scotland

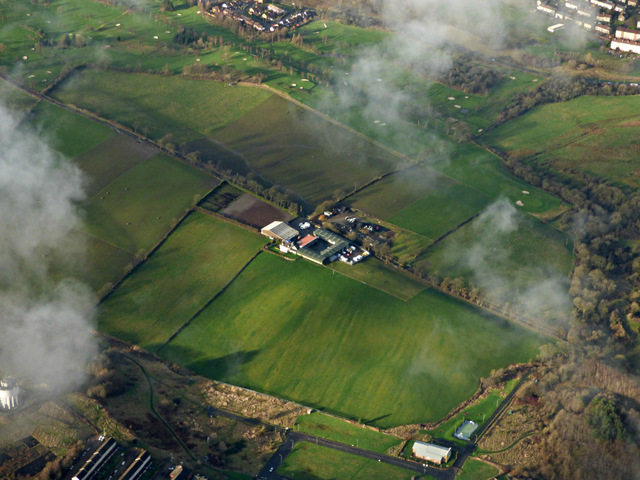
- Cleddans Farm from the air
- Interactive map of Cleddans
- 55°55′12.7″N 4°23′19.3″W
- Location: Glasgow, United Kingdom

History
- Built: Antoninus Pius

Site notes
- Excavation dates: 1980 (Trial trenching)
- Condition: Ploughed over

Cleddans is the site of a Roman fortlet on the Antonine Wall in Scotland. Its postulated existence was confirmed by trial trenching in 1979. Evidence of building work on Cleddans and on the Wall by units of both the sixth and the twentieth legions has been found in the area.

== Discovery ==
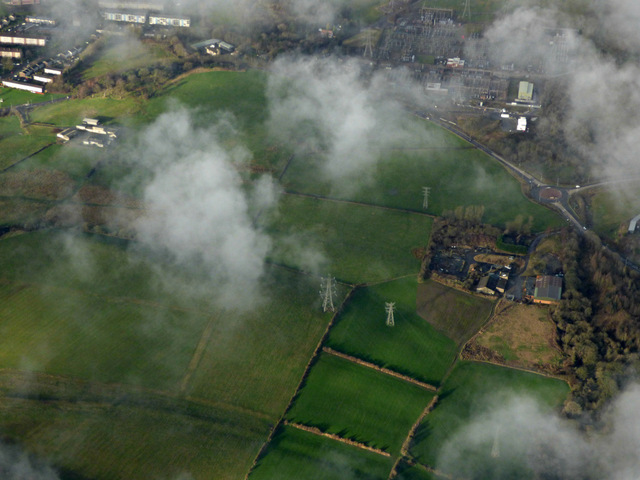
Hutcheson Hill from the air

Cleddans Roman fortlet was located by trial trenching in 1980 south of the main road between Duntocher and Bearsden. Hutcheson Hill being halfway between the known Roman forts of Duntocher to the west and Castlehill to the east and having a line of sight between them, it was surmised that it may hold the site of an intermediate fort. This fortlet's discovery at Cleddans seemed to strengthen the proposal that the Antonine Wall was designed with fortlets around every mile as measured by the Romans. The fort discovered measures internally 18 metres (59 ft) east-west by 17.6 metres (58 ft) north-south within a rampart set on a 3.6 metres (12 ft) wide stone base.

== Occupation ==
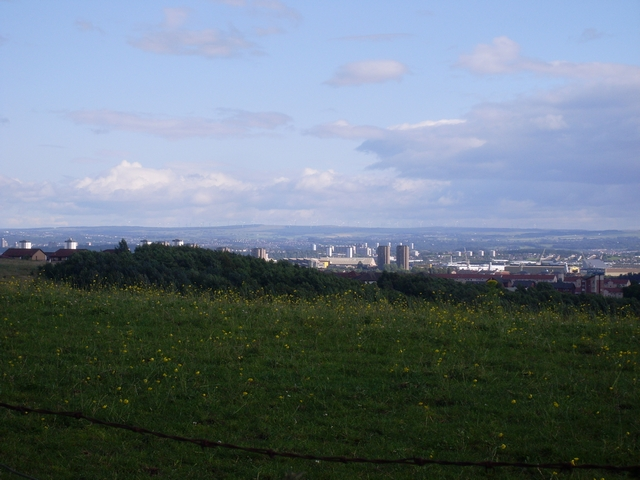
View to Glasgow from Cleddans Road

Cleddans was constructed between 142 and 154 AD at the order of Roman Emperor Antoninus Pius. Quintus Lollius Urbicus, governor of Roman Britain at the time, initially supervised the effort. It was one of a string of forts and fortlets built to support the Antonine Wall; troop movement was facilitated by a road linking all the sites known as the Military Way. Antoninus Pius never visited Britain, whereas his predecessor Hadrian did. Pressure from the Caledonians may have led Antoninus to send the empire's troops further north. The wall, and Cleddans, was abandoned only eight years after completion, and the garrison relocated back to Hadrian's Wall. In 208 Emperor Septimius Severus re-established legions at the wall and ordered repairs; this has led to the wall being referred to as the Severan Wall. The occupation ended a few years later, and the wall was not occupied again.

Most Roman fortlets along the wall held garrisons of around 500 men. Larger forts like Castlecary and Birrens had a nominal garrison of a cohort of 1,000 men but there is evidence that they sheltered women and children as well, although the troops were not allowed to marry. It is likely that there were communities of civilians around the site.

== Finds ==
Finds from the site include three or four Roman tablets. One shows a running boar, the emblem of the 20th legion. It was discovered in 1695 at Cochno House. The Hunterian Museum in Glasgow holds it as part of its collection.

A subsequent find was a panelled tablet discovered at Braidfield Farm in 1812, just west of Cleddans Farm. It shows two winged Victories, each standing on a globe, holding up a rectangular inscription. On the left is an armed Mars and, on the right, Virtus is depicted with a sheathed sword and a military standard. There are two decorative pelta shields, one on either side of the slab. The inscription contains the words "Opus Valli": apparently the Romans' name for their wall. The slab also resides in the Hunterian Museum.

The last tablet found showed a palm tree and another running boar, the symbol of the 20th legion. It was discovered just south of the Antonine Wall on Hutcheson Hill in 1865. It was lost in a fire at Chicago in 1871. The Hunterian has a plaster cast made from the original. On either side of the tablet is a naked Cupid, each with a sickle in its inner hand and a bunch of grapes in its outer. Symmetry suggests the lower right rosette is missing. It is similar to another slab, often associated with Old Kilpatrick, which had its lower right rosette found on a separate fragment.

The three slabs hold building inscriptions from the Twentieth (two) and Sixth (one) Legions dedicated to the emperor Antoninus Pius. They have been dated to 139–161 AD. No coins have been found at the site.

A well-preserved fourth tablet (RIB 3507) was found on the west of Hutcheson Hill in March 1969 at Cleddans Farm. It is sometimes attributed to Castlehill. It has been scanned and a video produced. Photos are available for educational and research use. Its depiction of subdued natives is similar to the slabs at Bridgeness and Westerwood. Other symbols like the jumping boar require more knowledge. Who the female figure depicts is uncertain; Victoria, Britannia, and Faustina the Elder have been proposed.

Sir George Macdonald wrote about the site in the 1911 first edition and 1934 second edition of The Roman wall in Scotland.

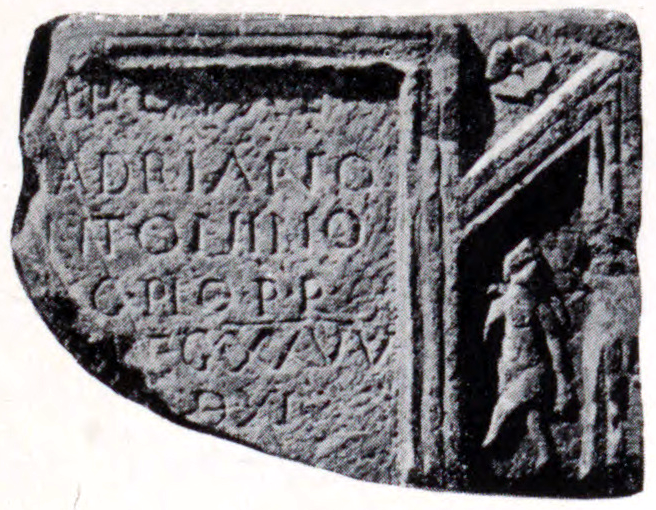
RIB 2206. Distance Slab of the Twentieth Legion Valeria Victrix It was found towards the west of the wall and is often associated with Old Kilpatrick. George MacDonald calls in no. 16 in the 2nd edition of his book The Roman Wall in Scotland.

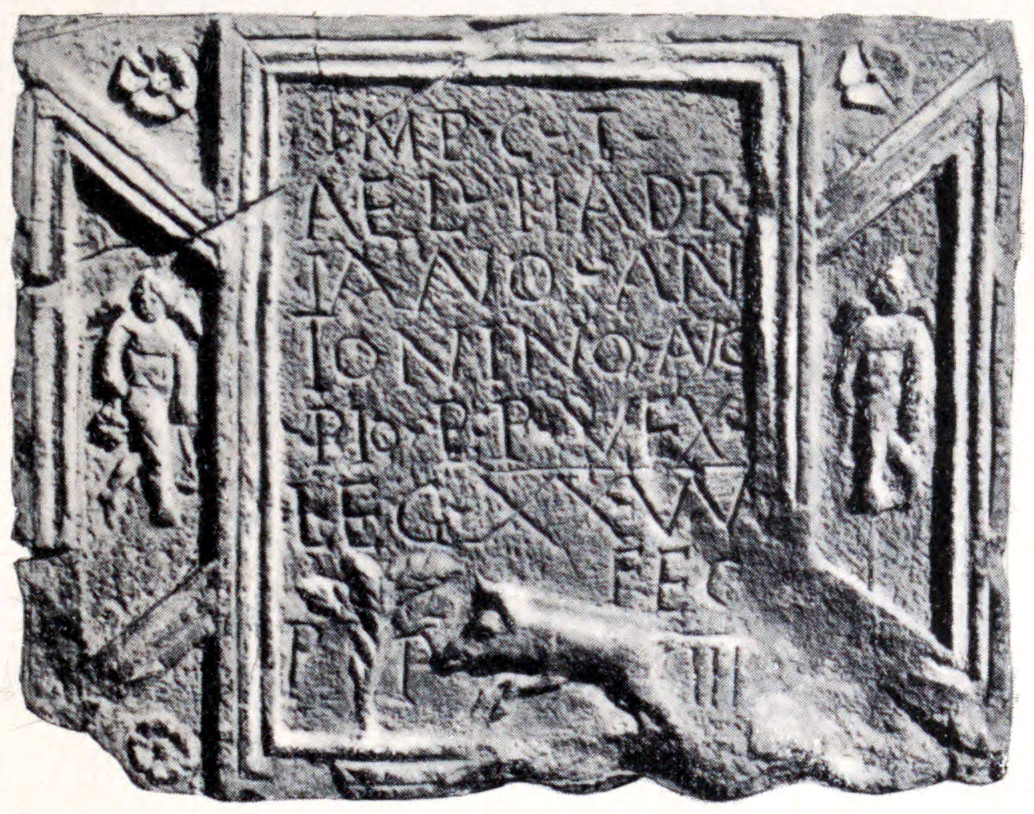
RIB 2198. Distance Slab of the Twentieth Legion It was found near Cleddans. George MacDonald calls in no. 10 in the 2nd edition of his book The Roman Wall in Scotland. It was destroyed in the Great Chicago Fire.

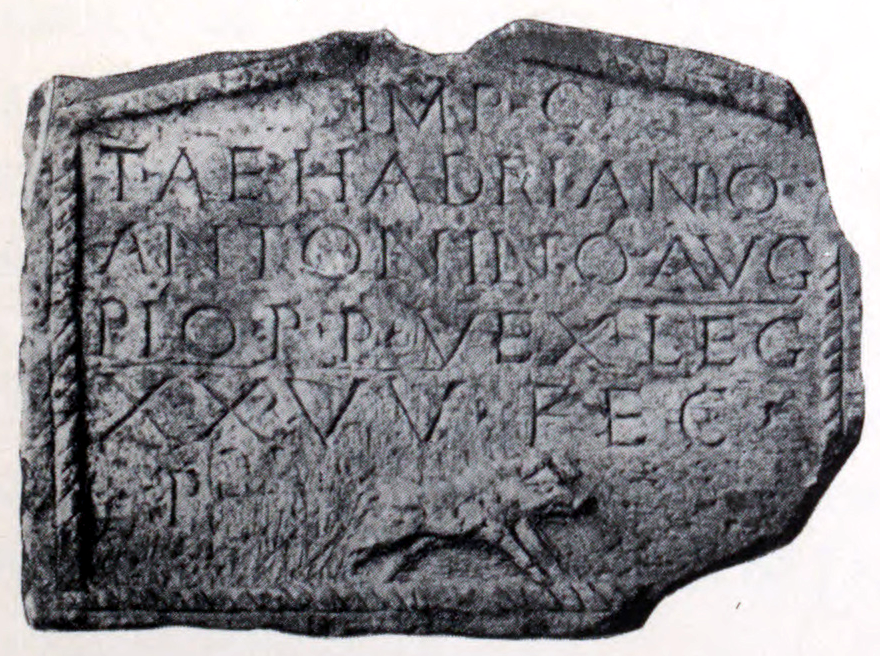
RIB 2199. Distance Slab of the Twentieth Legion Valeria Victrix George MacDonald calls in no. 13 in the 2nd edition of his book The Roman Wall in Scotland. It may have been a "waster" and lacks distance data. It has been scanned and a video produced.

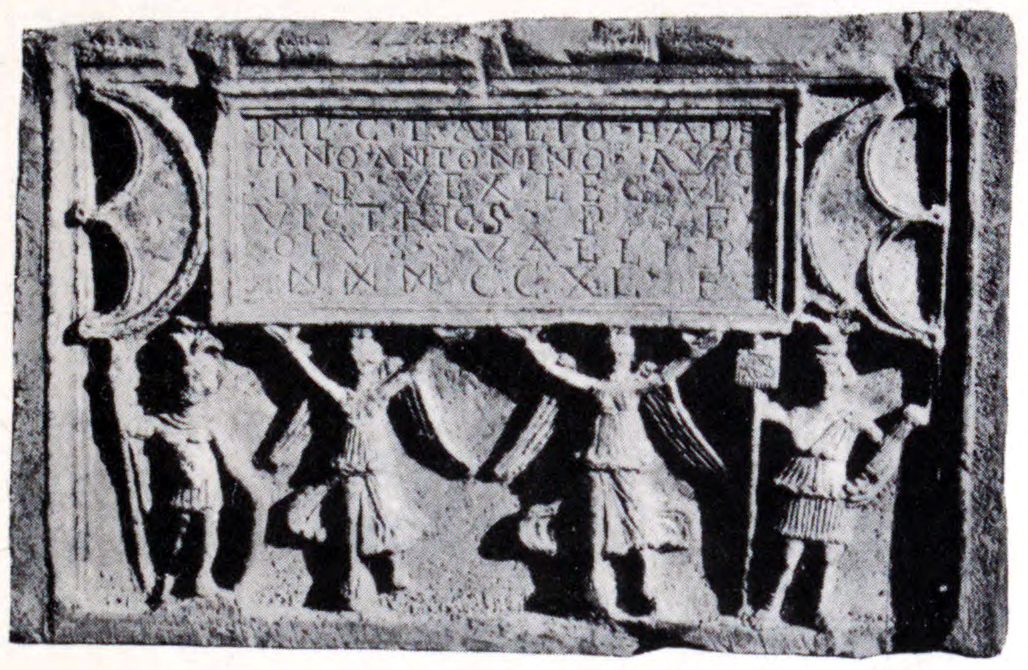
RIB 2200. Distance Slab of the Sixth Legion George MacDonald calls in no. 11 in the 2nd edition of his book The Roman Wall in Scotland. It was found at Braidfield Farm which is between Cleddans and Duntocher. It has been scanned and a video produced.

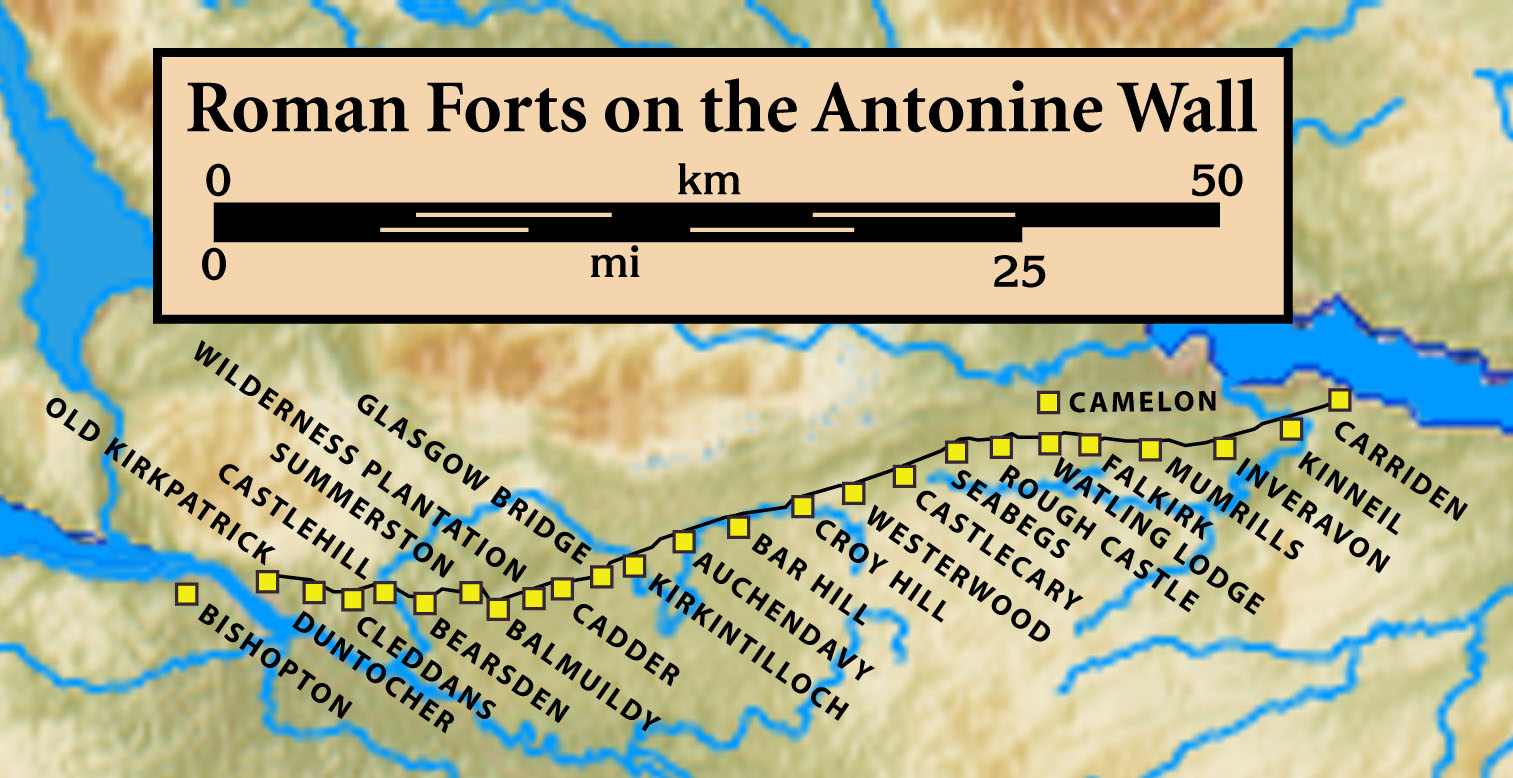
Forts and Fortlets associated with the Antonine Wall from west to east: Bishopton, Old Kilpatrick, Duntocher, Cleddans, Castlehill, Bearsden, Summerston, Balmuildy, Wilderness Plantation, Cadder, Glasgow Bridge, Kirkintilloch, Auchendavy, Bar Hill, Croy Hill, Westerwood, Castlecary, Seabegs, Rough Castle, Camelon, Watling Lodge, Falkirk, Mumrills, Inveravon, Kinneil, Carriden
