= Royal Commission on National Museums and Galleries =

The Royal Commission on National Museums and Galleries, which produced its final report in 1930, was a royal commission into the operation of museums and galleries in the United Kingdom. The Standing Commission on Museums and Galleries was established in 1931 as a result of the commission's work.

One of the people appointed to the commission was George Macdonald (archaeologist).

The commission produced an interim report in 1928, and a final report in two parts in 1929 and 1930.

== See also ==
- Royal Commission on the British Museum
