= Mumrills =

Roman fort site in Scotland

Coordinates: 55°59′44″N 3°44′07″W

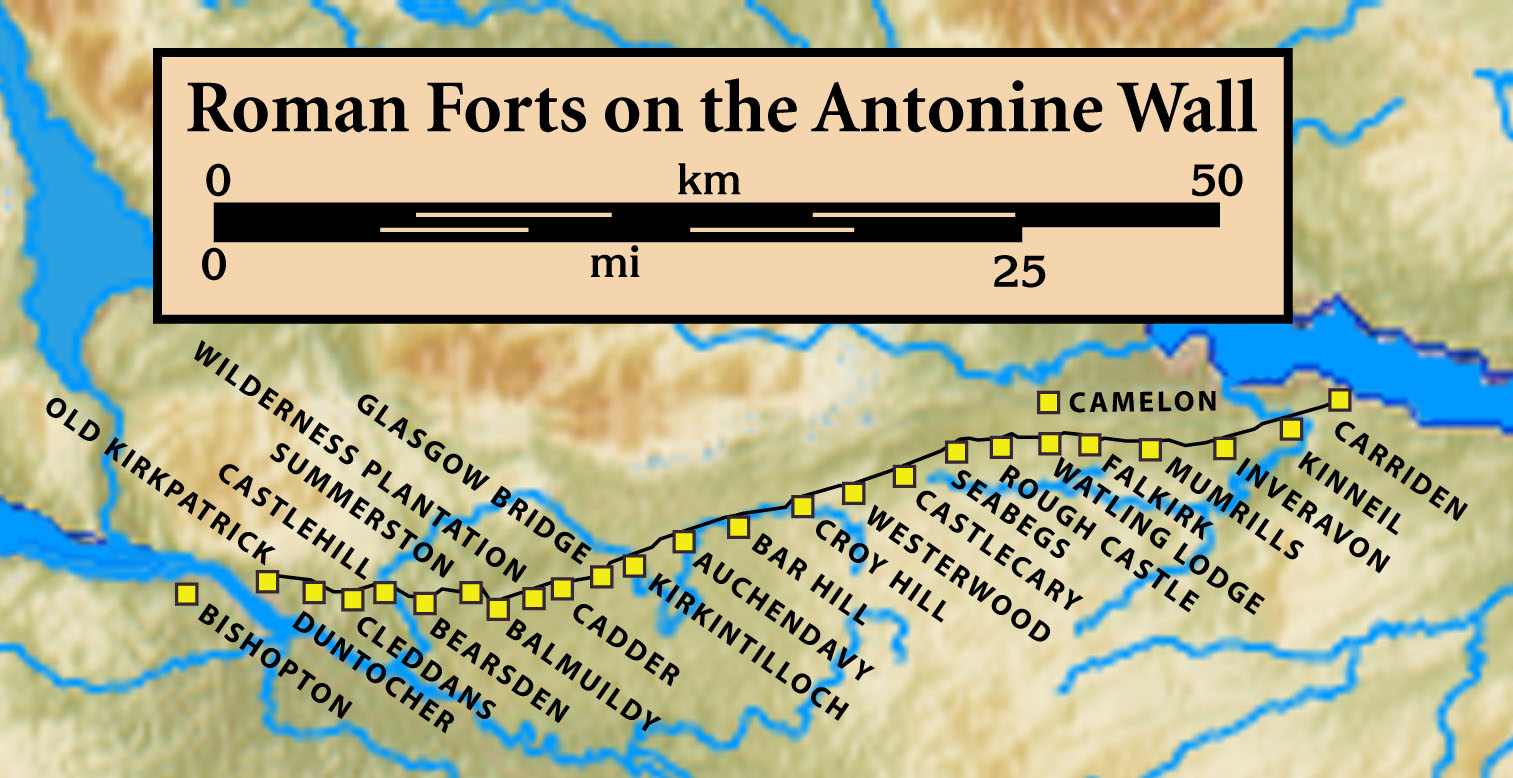
Forts and Fortlets associated with the Antonine Wall from west to east: Bishopton, Old Kilpatrick, Duntocher, Cleddans, Castlehill, Bearsden, Summerston, Balmuildy, Wilderness Plantation, Cadder, Glasgow Bridge, Kirkintilloch, Auchendavy, Bar Hill, Croy Hill, Westerwood, Castlecary, Seabegs, Rough Castle, Camelon, Watling Lodge, Falkirk, Mumrills, Inveravon, Kinneil, Carriden

Mumrills was the site of the largest Roman fort on the Antonine Wall in Scotland. It is possible that Mumrills could exchange signals with Flavian Gask Ridge forts. Some believe Mumrills may have been the site of Wallace's defeat at the Battle of Falkirk. The farm at Mumrills was also used as an early site for the Falkirk Relief Church.

== Excavations ==
Excavations, which took place in the years 1923-1928 and 1958-1960, established its outline. Photographs of the excavations can be found online.

== Inscribed Stones ==
An altar to Hercules Magusanus was found in 1841 "near the Bridge at Brightons" about a mile south-east of this fort. It is now in the National Museums Scotland.

A second altar to the Matres (mother goddesses) was found at Mumrills. The altar was dedicated by Cassius, a signifer serving at the fort. The historian Alfred von Domaszewski had suggested that the "Matres" mentioned in the altar were actually the Campestres, another term for the Silvanae. It was carved between 140 and 165 AD.

A third inscribed stone has been described as a "Funerary inscription for Nectovelius". George Macdonald says the translation is: "To the Divine Manes. Nectovelius, son of Vindex. Aged thirty. A Brigantian by birth, he served for nine years in the Second Cohort of Thracians." The Brigantes were a Celtic tribe who controlled the largest section of what would become Northern England. This shows local recruitment of native Britons.

== Other Finds and Videos of Scans ==
A stone carving of Hercules was found in a back garden in the village of Laurieston, Falkirk in 1987.

Other finds include a section of a palmate funerary monument, a heavy, iron chisel, a set of wrought iron tongs, a box flue tile, a cooking pot of back burnished ware, and a large piece of Roman concrete made out of crushed tile.

Many Roman forts along the wall held garrisons of around 500 men. Larger forts like Castlecary and Birrens had a nominal cohort of 1000 men but probably sheltered women and children as well although the troops were not allowed to marry. There is likely too to have been large communities of civilians around the site. Something of the soldiers' diet may be inferred from the variety of animal bones and shells found at the fort. Other buildings have been found which might have supported smelly industries like tanning or smithing. A hearth was found which could have been used to support troops.

== Gallery ==
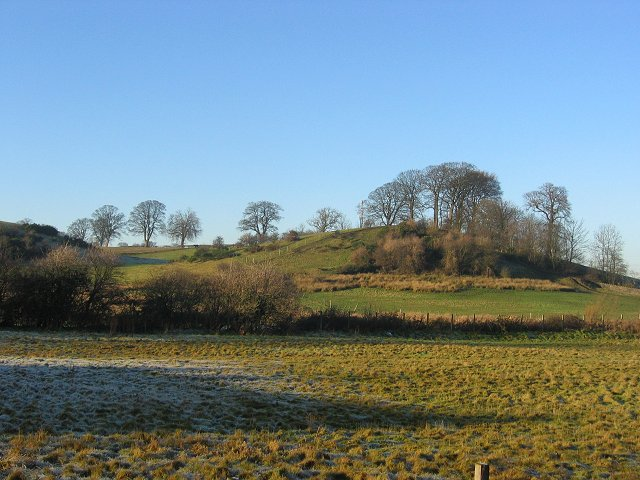
Site of the Antonine Wall near Mumrills Road

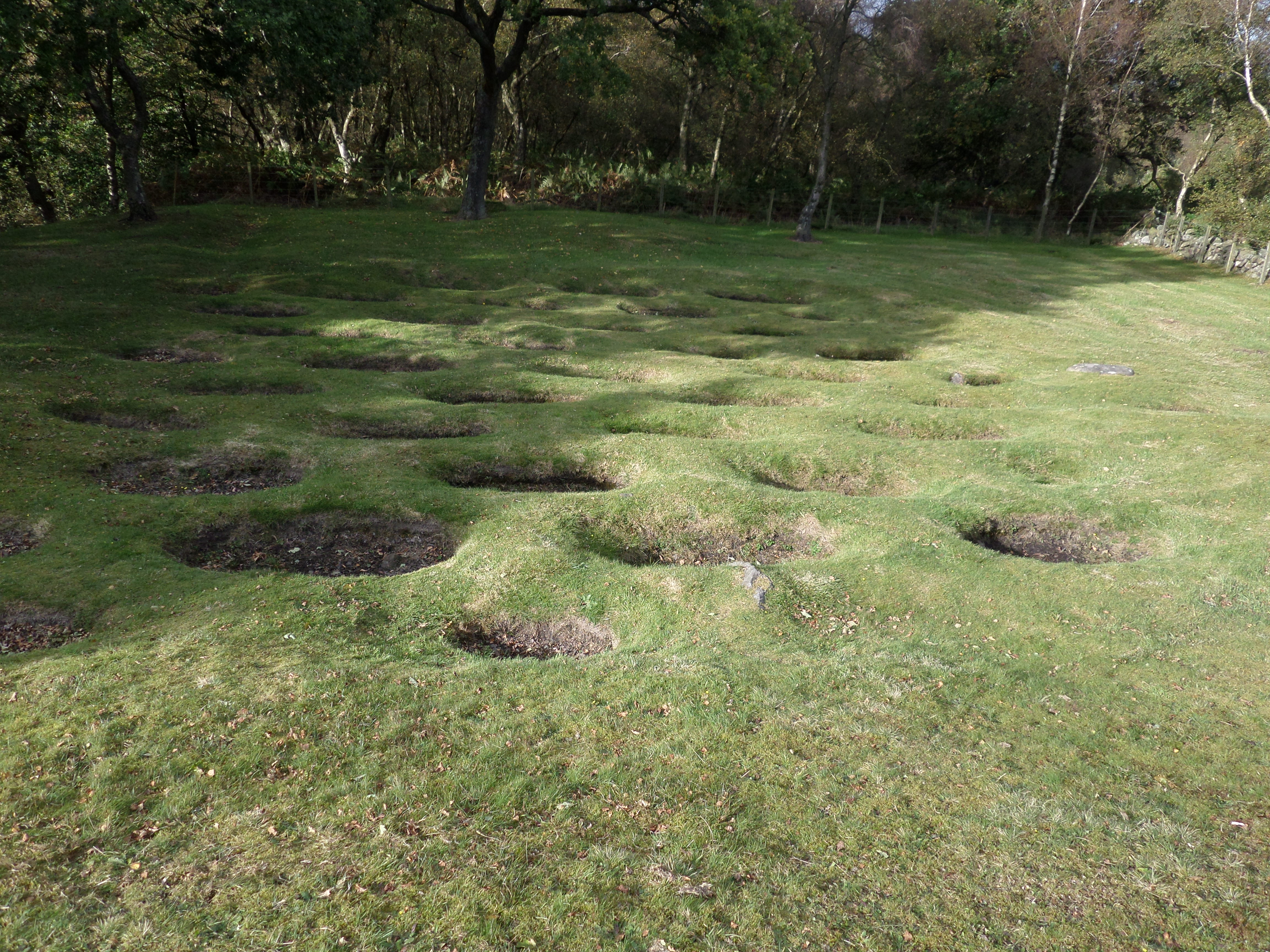
There is evidence to show that Mumrills had lilia pits like those that can still be seen at Roughcastle.

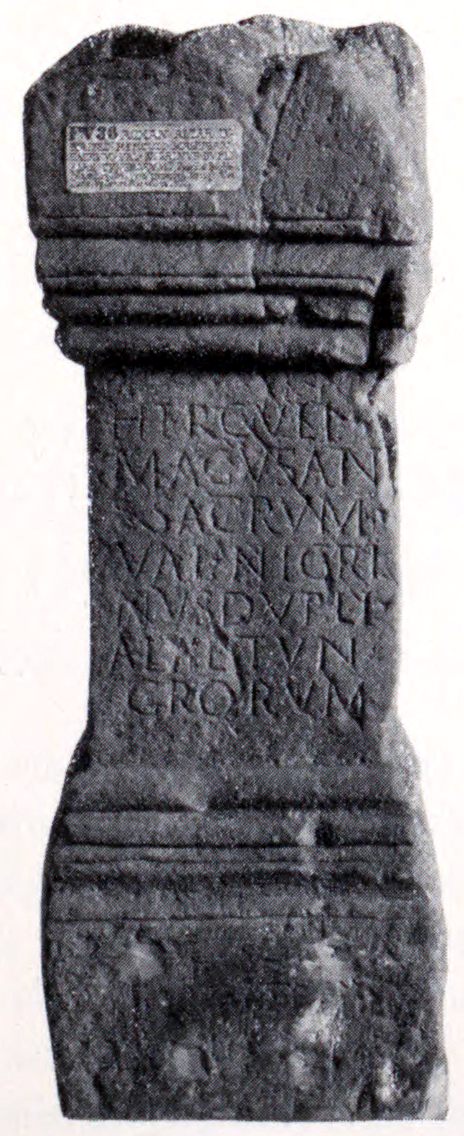
RIB 2140. Altar dedicated to Hercules Magusanus. George MacDonald calls in no. 33 in the 2nd edition of his book The Roman Wall in Scotland.

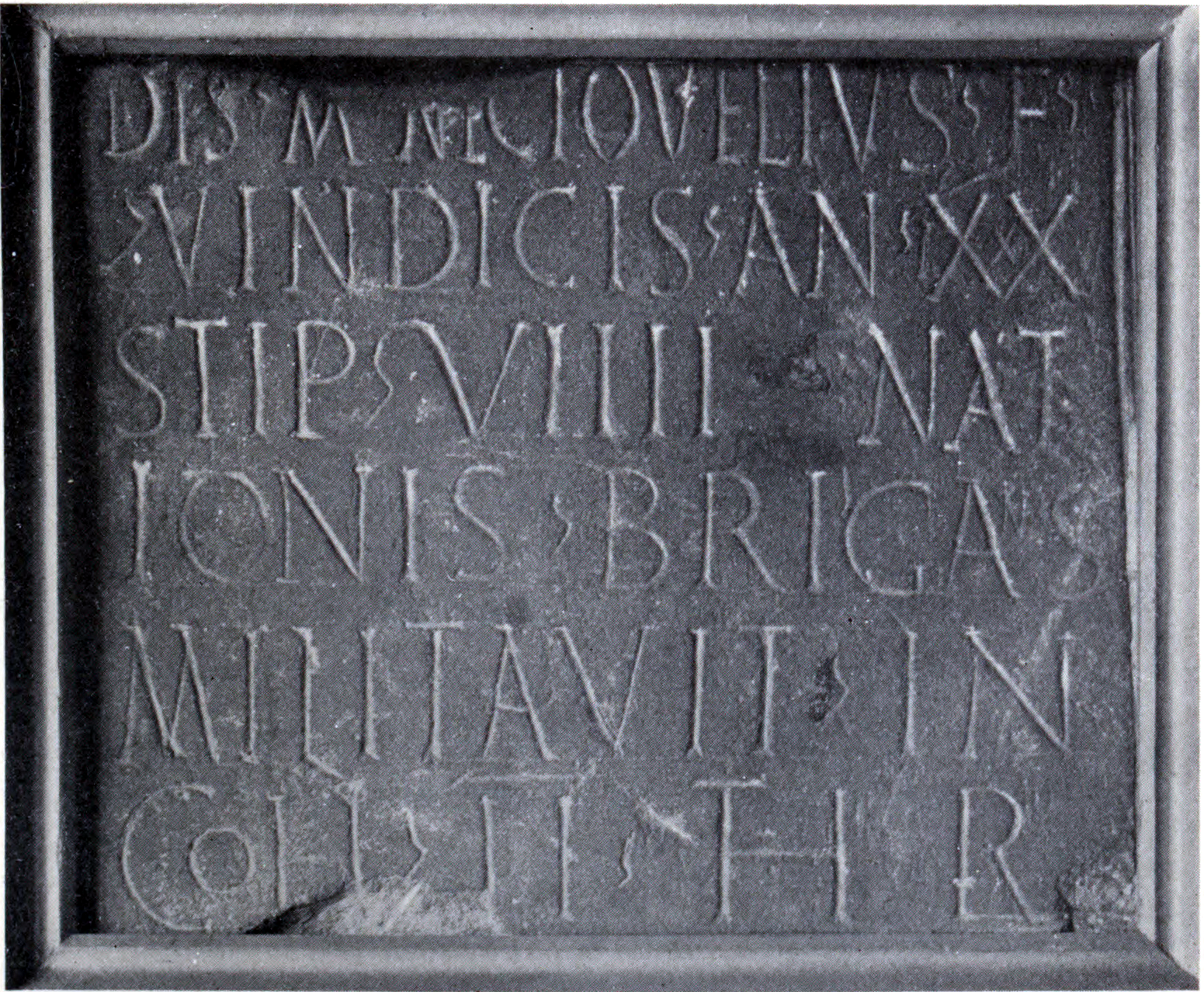
RIB 2142. Funerary inscription for Nectovelius. George MacDonald calls in no. 55 in the 2nd edition of his book The Roman Wall in Scotland.

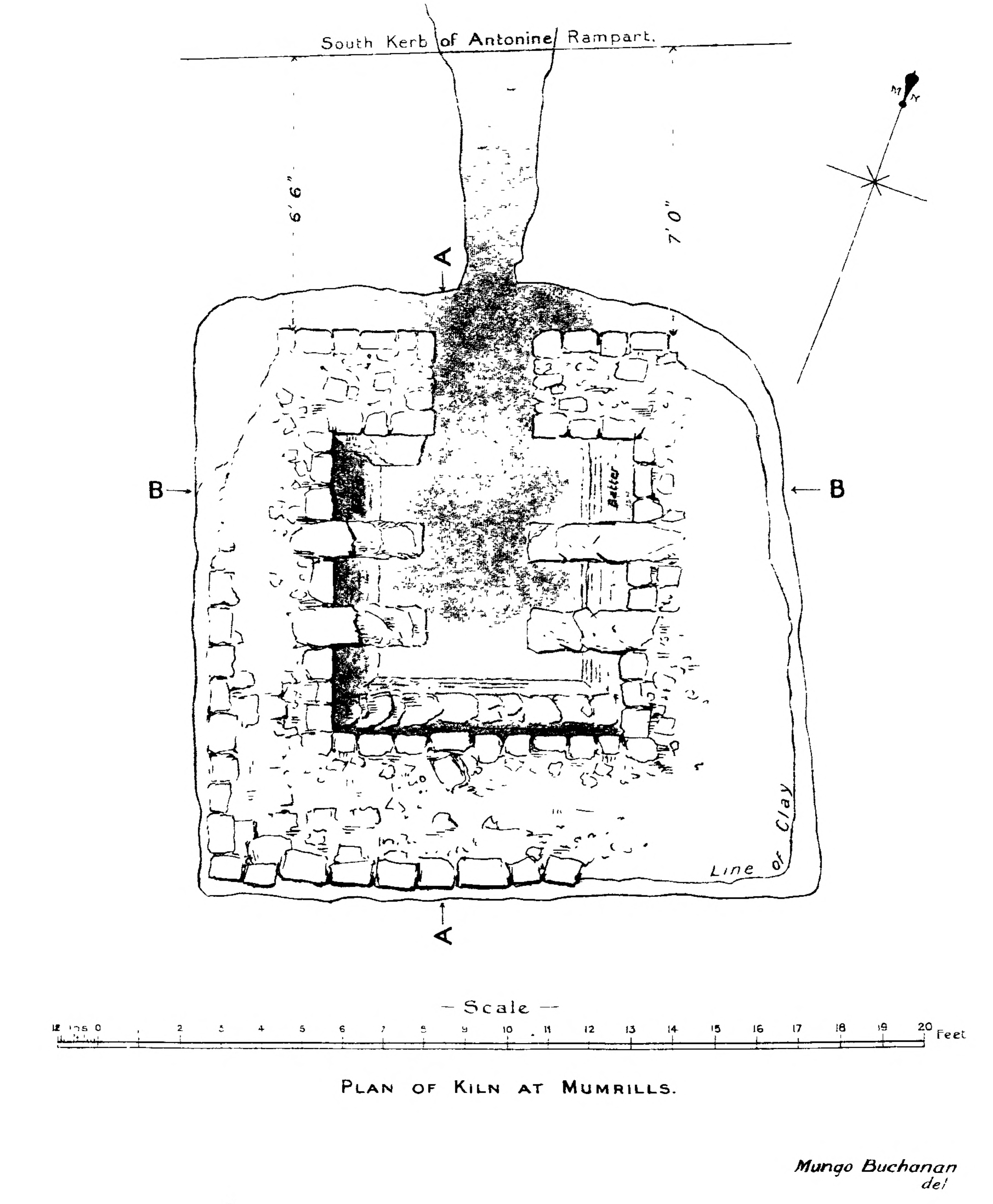
Sketch plan of kiln at Mumrills, by Mungo Buchanan from the Proceedings Of The Society Of Antiquaries Of Scotland (1914-1915) Vol 49

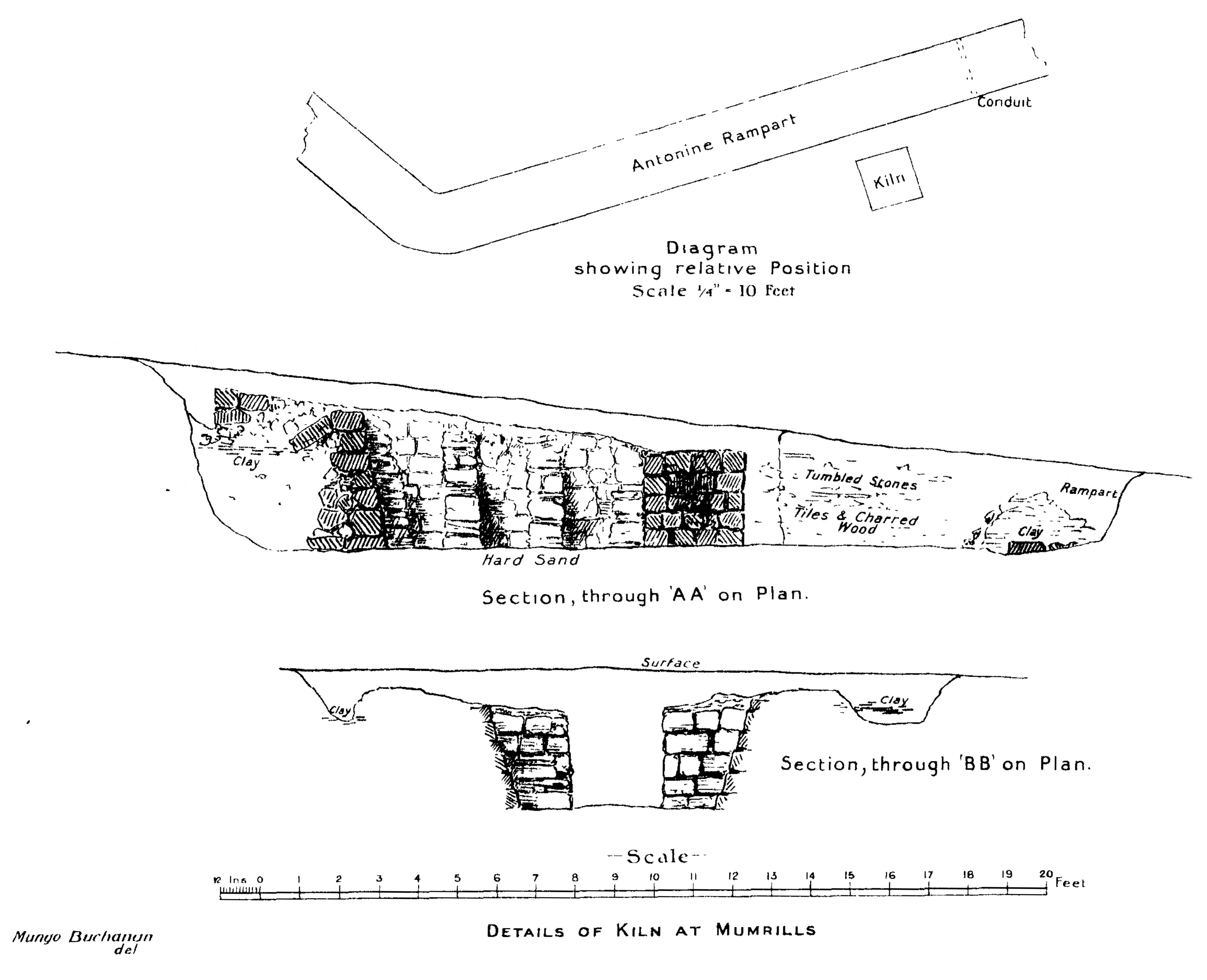
Details of kiln at Mumrills
