= Museums, Libraries and Archives Council =

- Successor: Arts Council England; The National Archives
- Formation: 1931
- Dissolved: 2012
- Type: Non-departmental public body
- Chairman: Sir Andrew Motion
- chief executive officer: Roy Clare CBE
- Website: inspiringlearningforall.gov.uk

The Museums, Libraries and Archives Council (MLA) was until May 2012 a non-departmental public body and a registered charity in England with a remit to promote improvement and innovation in the area of museums, libraries, and archives. Its functions spanned the UK and it advised the government on policy and priorities for these areas in England, receiving funding from the Department for Culture, Media and Sport (DCMS). The last chairman was Sir Andrew Motion (lately Poet Laureate) and the last chief executive officer (CEO) was Roy Clare CBE.

On 26 July 2010 it was announced that the MLA would be abolished under new proposals put forward by the Secretary of State for Culture, Olympics, Media and Sport, Jeremy Hunt, to reduce the number of public bodies funded by the government. Its functions relating to museums and libraries were transferred on 1 October 2011 to the Arts Council England, and those relating to archives to The National Archives. Some staff were employed until May 2012 to carry out remaining responsibilities including the appointment of a liquidator.

== History ==
The MLA was originally established as the Standing Commission on Museums and Galleries in 1931. It was set up following the recommendations of the Final Report of the Royal Commission on National Museums and Galleries, produced in 1929 and 1930. The Standing Commission was renamed the Museums and Galleries Commission (MGC) in September 1981 and given additional responsibilities. The MGC was a registered charity and incorporated under a Royal Charter on 1 January 1987. In April 2000, the MGC and the Library and Information Commission were combined into Re:source which was later renamed the MLA Council. The MLA was represented in London by MLA London, a separate charity that received core funding from the MLA.

In 2003 the MLA was a stakeholder in the Framework for the Future report that set out a vision for the future of public libraries in England. In 2008, working with The National Archives, the MLA developed a consultation document on "21st Century Archives". In 2009 the MLA published "Leading Museums" a vision and action plan for museums.

The MLA took over the running of the Designation Scheme, which began in 1997 under the auspices of the Museums and Galleries Commission (MGC). It was expanded in 2005 to include archives and libraries as well as museums that had pre-eminent collections of national or international importance held outside of national institutions. 135 collections had been awarded Designated status by 2011. After the abolition of the MLA the Designation Scheme was taken over by Arts Council England (ACE).
