= George Macdonald (archaeologist) =

British archaeologist and numismatist (1862–1940)

Sir George Macdonald KCB FBA FSA FEIS
- 1917 portrait by Walter Stoneman
- Born: 30 January 1862; Elgin, Moray, Scotland
- Died: 9 August 1940 (aged 78); Edinburgh, Scotland
- Spouse: Margaret Tannahill Younger (m. 1897)

Academic background
- Education: Ayr Academy; University of Edinburgh; Balliol College, Oxford

Academic work
- Institutions: University of Glasgow
- Notable students: Anne Strachan Robertson
- Notable works: The Roman Wall in Scotland (1911; 2nd ed. 1934)

Sir George Macdonald KCB FBA FSA FEIS (30 January 1862 – 9 August 1940) was a British archaeologist and numismatist who studied the Antonine Wall.

== Life ==
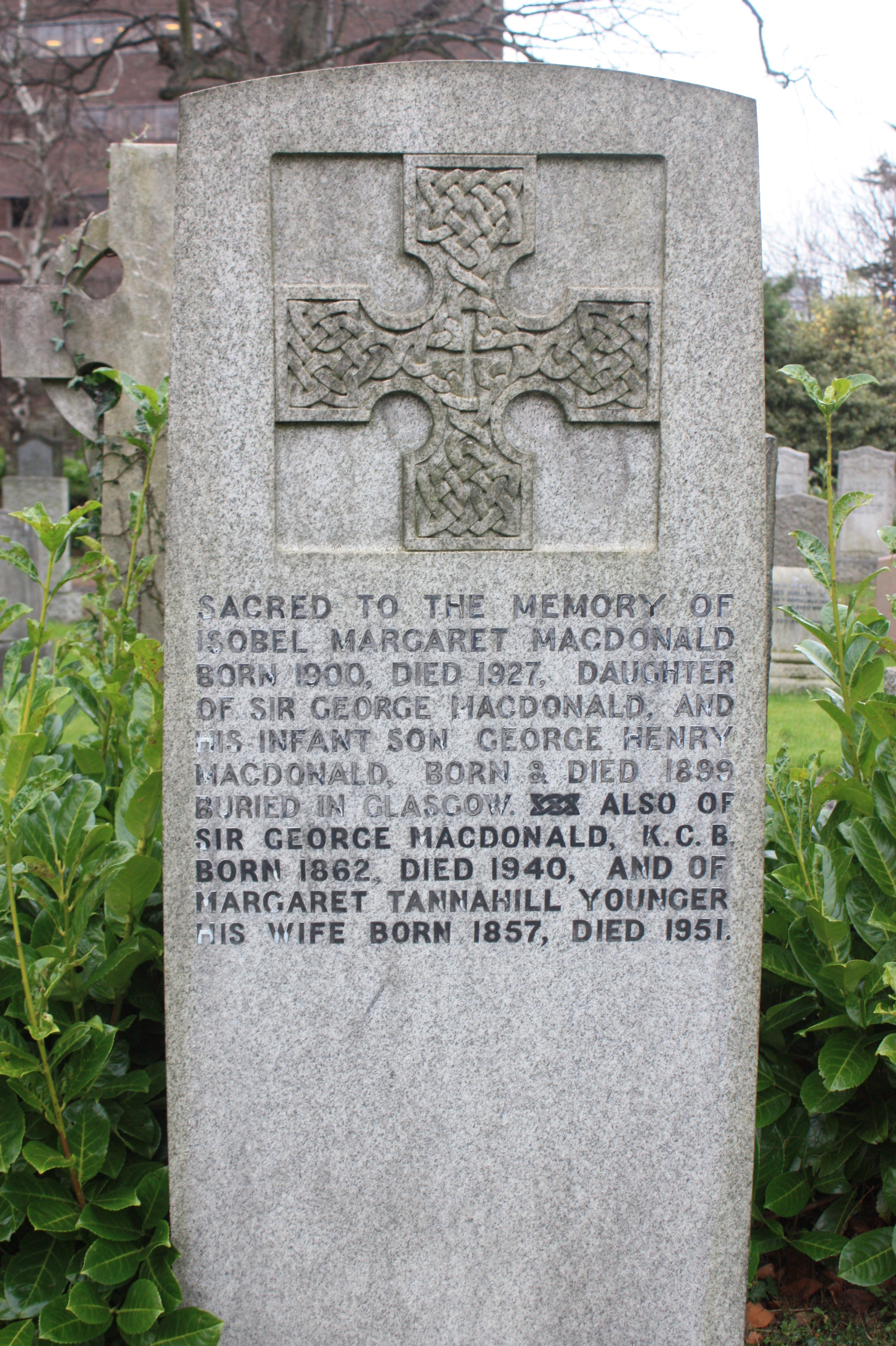
The grave of Sir George Macdonald, in Dean Cemetery, Edinburgh

Macdonald was born in Elgin on 30 January 1862. His father, James Macdonald, was a schoolmaster at Elgin Academy and his mother was Margaret Raff. His father moved from Elgin Academy to Ayr Academy during his early youth.

Macdonald was educated at Ayr Academy where his father had become rector. He studied in Germany and France, then at the University of Edinburgh and Balliol College, Oxford, graduating Master of Arts in 1887. He then took up a post teaching Classics at Kelvinside Academy. In 1892 he began lecturing in Greek at Glasgow University as Gilbert Murray's assistant. At this time he lived at 21 Lilybank Gardens in Glasgow.

Macdonald was involved in archaeological excavations from 1902, when he excavated Bar Hill Fort with Alexander Park. One of his obituaries says "scholarship is not incompatible with administrative ability". He employed "scientific method and equipment" in his fieldwork and excavations, resulting in new discoveries in the discipline of Romano-British history. Macdonald's father had also an interest in Roman archaeology.

His book The Roman Wall in Scotland (1911, revised 1934) was important in that it "drew together all known sites into one comprehensive volume".

Macdonald was a significant influence on Anne Strachan Robertson, one of his students; her obituary states that "Her own rich contribution owed much to the influence of Sir George Macdonald, who dominated Romano-British studies between the world wars. From him she imbibed the patience in noting details and the dispassionate weighing of evidence that Macdonald had so admired in Francis Haverfield, an earlier giant in the field".

In 1904 Macdonald left academia to join the civil service as Assistant Secretary to the Scottish Education Directorates, being promoted to Secretary in 1922. He is "best remembered for establishing the Leaving Certificate Examination and for introducing the first superannuation scheme for teachers in Scotland".

He retired in 1928.

He married Margaret Tannahill Younger (1857-1951) in 1897. They had three children; George Henry Macdonald who died in infancy (1899-1899), Isobel Margaret Macdonald (1900-1927) and James Younger Macdonald (1902-1960).

Macdonald died in Edinburgh on 9 August 1940, and is buried in the 20th-century extension to Dean Cemetery on Queensferry Road in western Edinburgh with his family.

He bequeathed around two hundred books on classical archaeology to the library at Edinburgh University.

== Awards and positions ==
From 1892-1904 Macdonald catalogued the collection of Greek coins in the Hunterian Museum and Art Gallery, Glasgow, and as a result was made Honorary Curator for life in 1905. This also led to him being awarded the prix Allier de Hauteroche in (1907).

From 1921-26 he was president of the Society for the Promotion of Roman Studies, and from 1935-36 the president of the Royal Numismatic Society. From 1927-30 he was appointed to the Royal Commission on National Museums and Galleries, and then the Standing Commission which followed it. He was chair of the Royal Commission on the Ancient and Historical Monuments of Scotland from 1934 until his death. From 1933-40 he served as President of the Society of Antiquaries of Scotland.

Macdonald was awarded the medal of the Royal Numismatic Society in 1913.

He received honorary doctorates from Oxford University, the University of Cambridge, the University of Glasgow and Edinburgh University.

He was made a Knight Commander of the Order of the Bath (KCB) by King George V in 1927.

In 1932 a volume of the Journal of Roman Studies (22) was issued in his honour.

== Portraits ==
- Sir George Macdonald, 1862-1940. Archaeologist, by Maurice Greiffenhagen
- Sir George Macdonald, 1917, by Walter Stoneman

== Publications ==
- Catalogue of Greek Coins in the Hunterian Collection, University of Glasgow, 3 vols (Glasgow, 1899-1905)
- Coin Types: Their Origin and Development (the Rhind Lectures of 1904) (Glasgow, 1905).
- The Roman Forts on the Bar Hill, Dumbartonshire (Glasgow, 1906), with Alexander Park.
- The Roman Wall in Scotland (the Dalrymple Lectures of 1910) (1911), revised and republished in 1934
- "The building of the Antonine Wall: a fresh study of the inscriptions". Journal of Roman Studies (1921) 11:1–24.
- "Ancient Persian Coins in India", "Ancient Greek Coins in India" and "The Hellenic Kingdoms of Syria, Bactria and Parthia", in The Cambridge Ancient History of India, vol. 1 (1922), pp. 342–4, 386-90, 427-66.
- The Roman Occupation of Britain (the Ford Lectures delivered by Francis Haverfield and revised by Macdonald) (Oxford 1924).
