= Banknock railway station =

Disused railway station in Falkirk, Scotland

Banknock
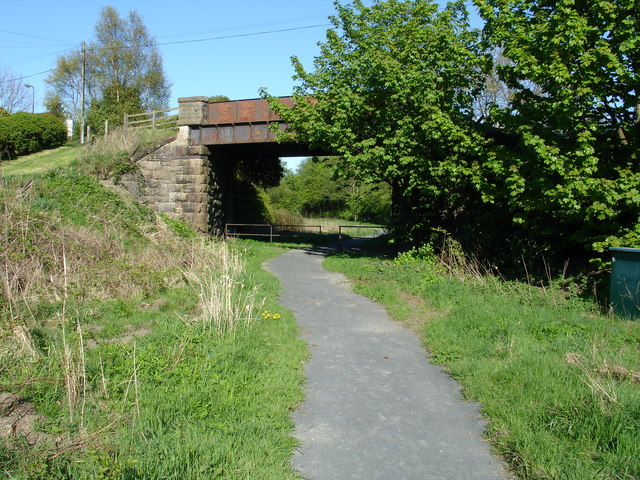
- Station site in 2007

General information
- Location: Falkirk; Scotland
- Coordinates: 55.9914°N 3.9562°W
- Grid reference: NS779793
- Platforms: 2

Other information
- Status: Disused

History
- Original company: Kilsyth and Bonnybridge railway
- Pre-grouping: North British Railway
- Post-grouping: London and North Eastern Railway

Key dates
- 2 July 1888: Station opened
- 1 February 1935: Station closed
Location

Banknock railway station served the village of Banknock in Scotland. The station was served by trains on the lines from Kilsyth New to Bonnybridge.

== History ==
Opened by the Kilsyth and Bonnybridge railway in 1888, and absorbed into the North British Railway, it became part of the London and North Eastern Railway during the Grouping of 1923. The station closed along with the line in 1935.

Preceding station	Disused railways	Following station
Colzium; Line and station closed	Kilsyth and Bonnybridge Railway	Dennyloanhead; Line and station closed
