= Colzium railway station =

Disused railway station in Colzium, North Lanarkshire

Colzium

General information
- Location: Colzium, North Lanarkshire; Scotland
- Coordinates: 55.9798°N 4.0281°W
- Grid reference: NS735781
- Platforms: 1

Other information
- Status: Disused

History
- Original company: Kilsyth and Bonnybridge Railway
- Pre-grouping: North British Railway

Key dates
- 2 July 1888: Opened
- 1 March 1917: Closed
Location

Colzium railway station served the area of Colzium, North Lanarkshire, Scotland from 1888 to 1917 on the Kilsyth and Bonnybridge Railway.

== History ==
The station opened on 2 July 1888 by the Kilsyth and Bonnybridge Railway. To the east was the goods shed and its three sidings. The station closed on 1 March 1917.

Preceding station	Disused railways	Following station
Kilsyth New; Line and station closed	Kilsyth and Bonnybridge Railway	Banknock; Line and station closed
