= Kilsyth railway station =

Disused railway station in Kilsyth, North Lanarkshire

Kilsyth

General information
- Location: Kilsyth, North Lanarkshire; Scotland
- Coordinates: 55.9782°N 4.0609°W
- Grid reference: NS715780
- Platforms: 1

Other information
- Status: Disused

History
- Original company: Kilsyth and Bonnybridge Railway
- Pre-grouping: North British Railway
- Post-grouping: LNER

Key dates
- 1 July 1878: Opened as Kilsyth
- 1888: Name changed to Kilsyth (Old)
- 6 August 1951: Closed
Location

Kilsyth Old station served the town of Kilsyth in Scotland. It was the original terminus of the Kelvin Valley Railway.

== History ==
The station opened as Kilsyth on 1 January 1878 by the Kilsyth and Bonnybridge Railway. It was renamed to Kilsyth (Old) in 1888, renamed Kilsyth in 1936 and it closed on 6 August 1951.

Preceding station	Disused railways	Following station
Terminus	Kilsyth and Bonnybridge Railway	Kilsyth New; Line and station closed
Twechar; Line and station closed	Kelvin Valley Railway	Terminus
