= Bonnybridge railway station =

Disused railway station in Falkirk, Scotland

Bonnybridge

General information
- Location: Bonnybridge, Falkirk; Scotland
- Coordinates: 55.9974°N 3.8876°W (Canal)
- Grid reference: NS822799
- Platforms: 2 (Canal, High) / 1 (Central)

Other information
- Status: Disused

History
- Original company: Caledonian Railʸ. (Canal) / Kilsyth & Bonnybridge Railʸ. (Central) / Edinburgh & Glasgow Railʸ. (High)
- Pre-grouping: Caledonian Railʸ. (Canal); North British and Caledonian Railways jointly (Central); North British Railʸ. (High)
- Post-grouping: LMS (Canal); LNER (Central, High)

Key dates
- 2 August 1886: Opened (Canal)
- 28 July 1930: Closed (Canal)
Location

Bonnybridge railway station was a railway station serving the village of Bonnybridge in central Scotland. The station was located on a short branch off the Caledonian Railway line from Coatbridge to Larbert (There were two other "Bonnybridge" stations, on the Edinburgh and Glasgow main line and the Kilsyth line respectively).

== History ==
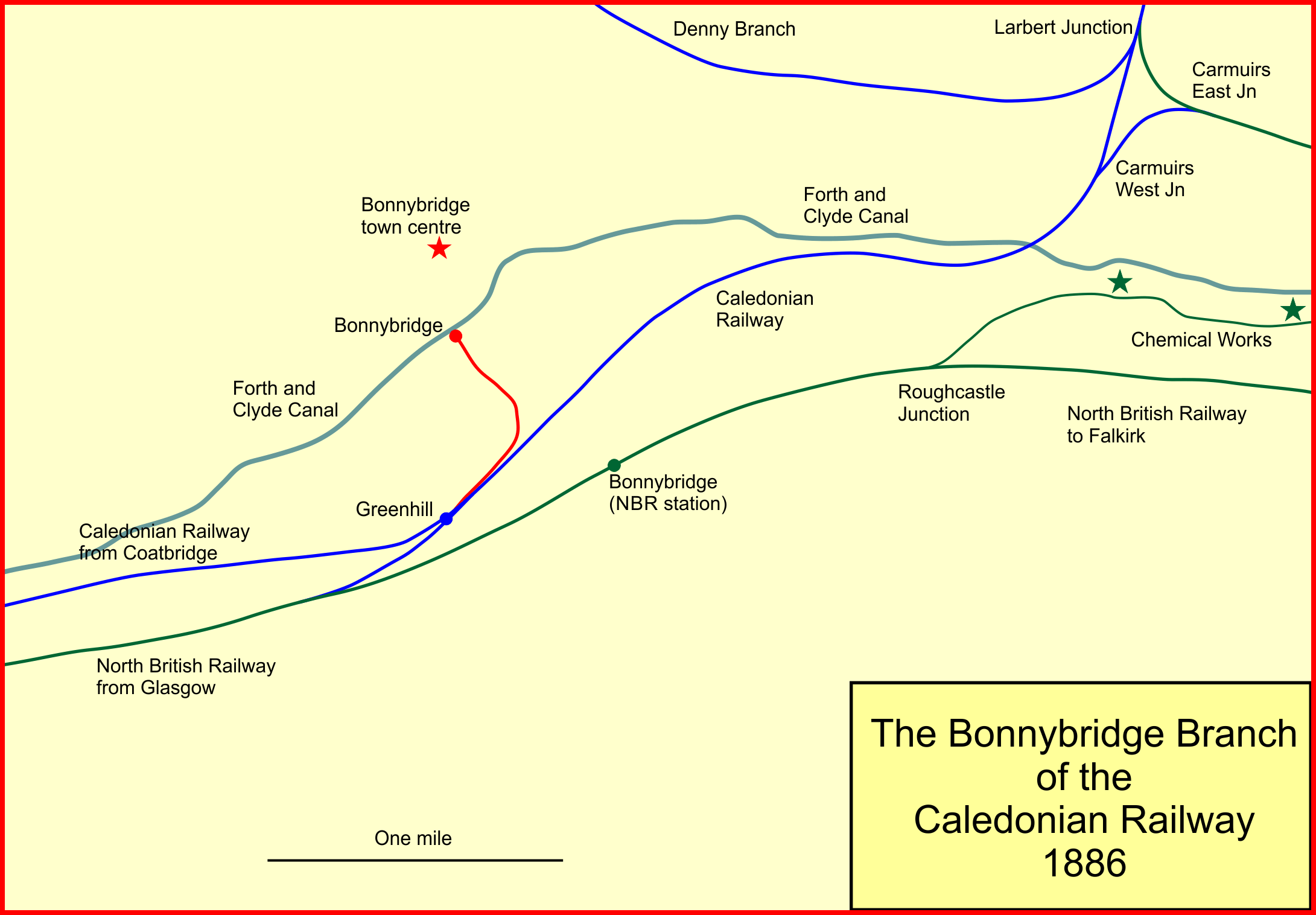
Map of the Bonnybridge branch

Bonnybridge is a small town located west of Falkirk in central Scotland. The Forth and Clyde Canal was opened in 1790, and the access to transportation encouraged the development of industry locally. The town was located on the north side of the canal. By the second half of the nineteenth century there were a tile works with a short tramway to the canal, a sawmill, a dyeworks, a smithy and three flour mills. Potash extraction developed later.

=== Bonnybridge (High) railway station ===
When the Edinburgh and Glasgow Railway opened on 1842, this initiated a major change in transport systems, and towns that were connected to the line found that their prosperity rose considerably, and those that were not suffered accordingly. The E&GR line passed a mile or so to the south of the canal.

The North British Railway took over the E&GR in 1865, and in May 1870 it opened a Bonnybridge station on the E&GR main line. This was of course somewhat remote from the town, and on the other side of the canal; access to cross the canal was by the so-called Radical Pend, and constricted tunnel under the canal which carried a watercourse to the Bonny Water. Fireclay and brick works developed in the area of the station itself.

Preceding station	Historical railways	Following station
Castlecary; Line open, station closed	Edinburgh and Glasgow Railway; North British Railway	Falkirk High; Line and station open

=== Bonnybridge (Canal) railway station ===
The Scottish Central Railway (SCR) opened its main line in 1848, connecting at junctions at Greenhill with the Edinburgh and Glasgow Railway (E&GR) and the Caledonian Railway. In the vicinity of Bonnybridge, the SCR route passed between the E&GR main line and the canal. A station was provided at Greenhill Junction, (Note: The station was known by several similar names.) but despite its location less than a mile away this was not convenient for Bonnybridge, being positioned on a road which had no bridge over the canal.

The Caledonian Railway absorbed the SCR in 1865. The former SCR route passed closest of all railways to the town. There was pressure from local industry to provide a proper railway connection, and the Caledonian agreed to do so, opening a short branch line from Greenhill on 2 August 1886. (Note: Ross says (page 130) "the Caledonian rather sneakily laid [the branch]" but he does not explain why this was underhand.)

On the south side of the canal, the line connected heavy industry which developed considerably, but the crossing under the canal was inconvenient, until a lift bridge was built in 1900.

The passenger business from the Caledonian terminus never developed, although the iron foundries produced significant mineral flows. In 1922 the branch had two return passenger journeys daily, and the station closed to passenger traffic on 28 July 1930, although occasional excursion special trains operated from the station later, probably until 1938. The location was renamed Bonnybridge Canal Goods Depot after passenger closure, to distinguish it from the other Bonnybridge locations. (Note: Ross implies (page 130) that the "Canal" identifier was always in use, but this is not supported in Bradshaw or other sources.) The 1960 Sectional Appendix shows the line as 1,210 yards (1,106 m) in length with a permanent speed restriction of 10 mph (16 km/h). The goods and mineral traffic continued until complete closure of the branch on 7 December 1964.

Preceding station	Historical railways	Following station
Greenhill Lower; Line and station closed	Scottish Central Railway	Terminus

=== Bonnybridge (Central) railway station ===
A more convenient station for Bonnybridge was opened on 2 July 1888, when the Kilsyth and Bonnybridge Railway opened. This offered better passenger connections, but more importantly at the time, a more convenient location for goods and mineral traffic inwards and outwards. Bonnybridge now had three stations.

Preceding station	Historical railways	Following station
Dennyloanhead; Line and station closed	Kilsyth and Bonnybridge Railway	Terminus
