= Kilsyth New railway station =

Disused railway station in Kilsyth, North Lanarkshire

Kilsyth (New)
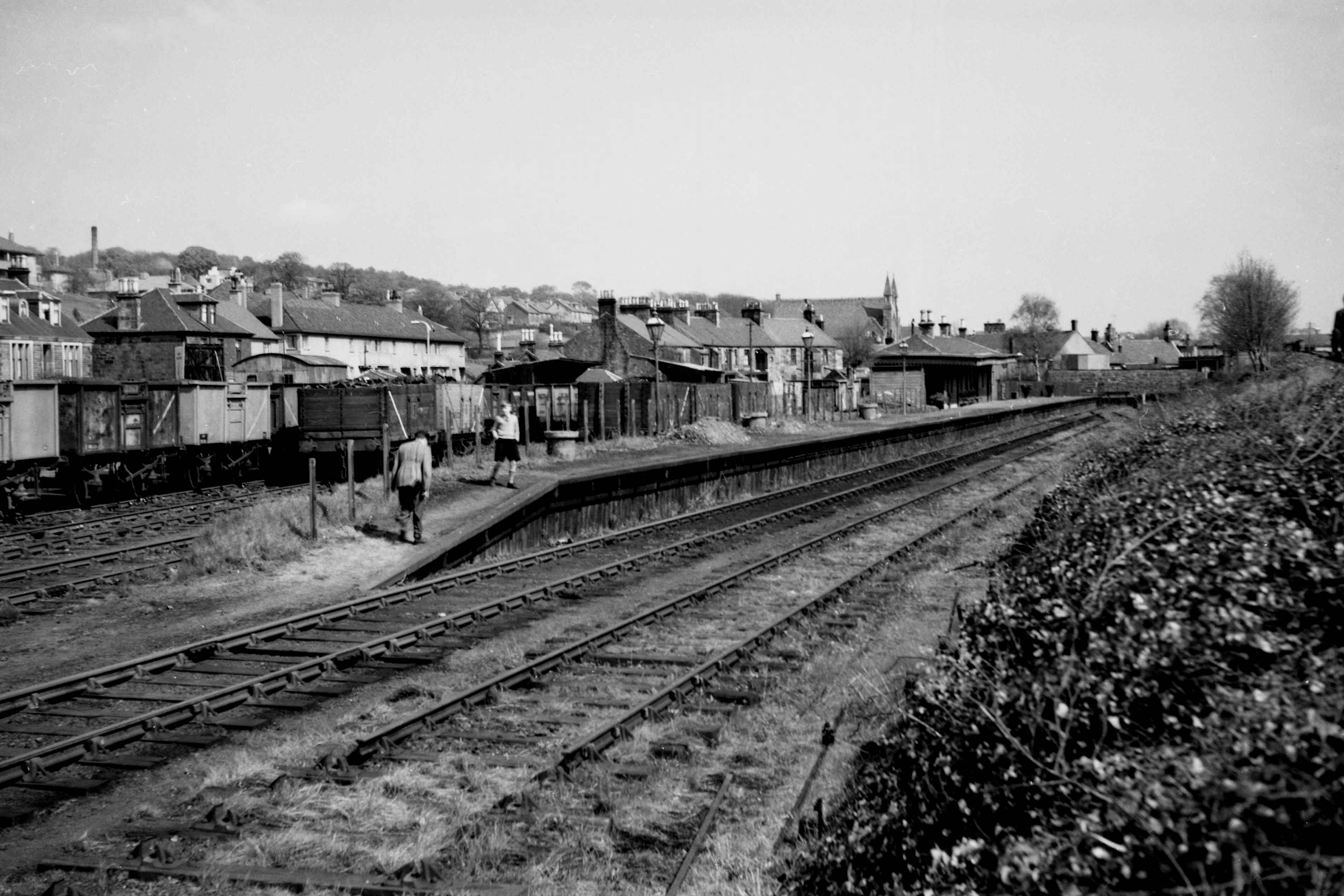
- The site of the station in 1958

General information
- Location: Kilsyth, North Lanarkshire; Scotland
- Coordinates: 55.9789°N 4.0529°W
- Grid reference: NS719781
- Platforms: 1

Other information
- Status: Disused

History
- Original company: Kilsyth and Bonnybridge Railway
- Pre-grouping: North British Railway
- Post-grouping: LNER

Key dates
- 2 July 1888: Opened
- 1 February 1935: Closed
Location

Kilsyth New station served the town of Kilsyth in Scotland. The station was on the Kilsyth and Bonnybridge Railway.

== History ==
The station opened on 2 July 1888. It was located on the corner of Kingston Road and Station Road and was a three-storey building. The station was demolished after the railway was closed and is now used as car repair workshop. The station closed on 1 February 1935.

Preceding station	Disused railways	Following station
Kilsyth; Line and station closed	Kilsyth and Bonnybridge Railway	Colzium; Line and station closed
