= Bonnybridge Central railway station =

Disused railway station in Bonnybridge, Falkirk

Bonnybridge Central

General information
- Location: Bonnybridge, Falkirk; Scotland
- Coordinates: 56.0022°N 3.8894°W
- Grid reference: NS822804
- Platforms: 1

Other information
- Status: Disused

History
- Original company: Kilsyth and Bonnybridge Railway
- Pre-grouping: North British Railway
- Post-grouping: LNER

Key dates
- 2 July 1888: Opened
- 1 February 1935: Closed
Location

Bonnybridge Central railway station served the village of Bonnybridge, Falkirk, Scotland from 1888 to 1935 on the Kilsyth and Bonnybridge Railway.

== History ==
The station opened on 2 July 1888 by the Kilsyth and Bonnybridge Railway. The goods yard was on the east side and the signal box was to the east. A locomotive shed called Bonnybridge Shed was north west. It had a single road and a turntable. The signal box was replaced in 1896. The station closed on 1 February 1935.

Preceding station	Disused railways	Following station
Dennyloanhead; Line and station closed	Kilsyth and Bonnybridge Railway	Terminus
