= Twechar railway station =

Former railway station in Scotland

Coordinates: 55.9665°N 4.0910°W

Twechar

General information
- Location: East Dunbartonshire; Scotland
- Grid reference: NS695768
- Platforms: 1

Other information
- Status: Disused

History
- Pre-grouping: North British Railway
- Post-grouping: London and North Eastern Railway

Key dates
- 1 June 1878: Station opens
- 29 September 1924: Station renamed as Twechar
- 6 August 1951: Station closed to passengers
- 1966: Coal traffic ceased.

Twechar railway station was opened in 1878 as Gavell on the Kelvin Valley Railway and renamed Twechar in 1924. The station served the hamlet of Twechar and the coal mining area, Gavell House and Farm, etc. in East Dunbartonshire until 1951 for passenger travel. and to coal traffic to the Cadder Yard until 1966.

== History ==
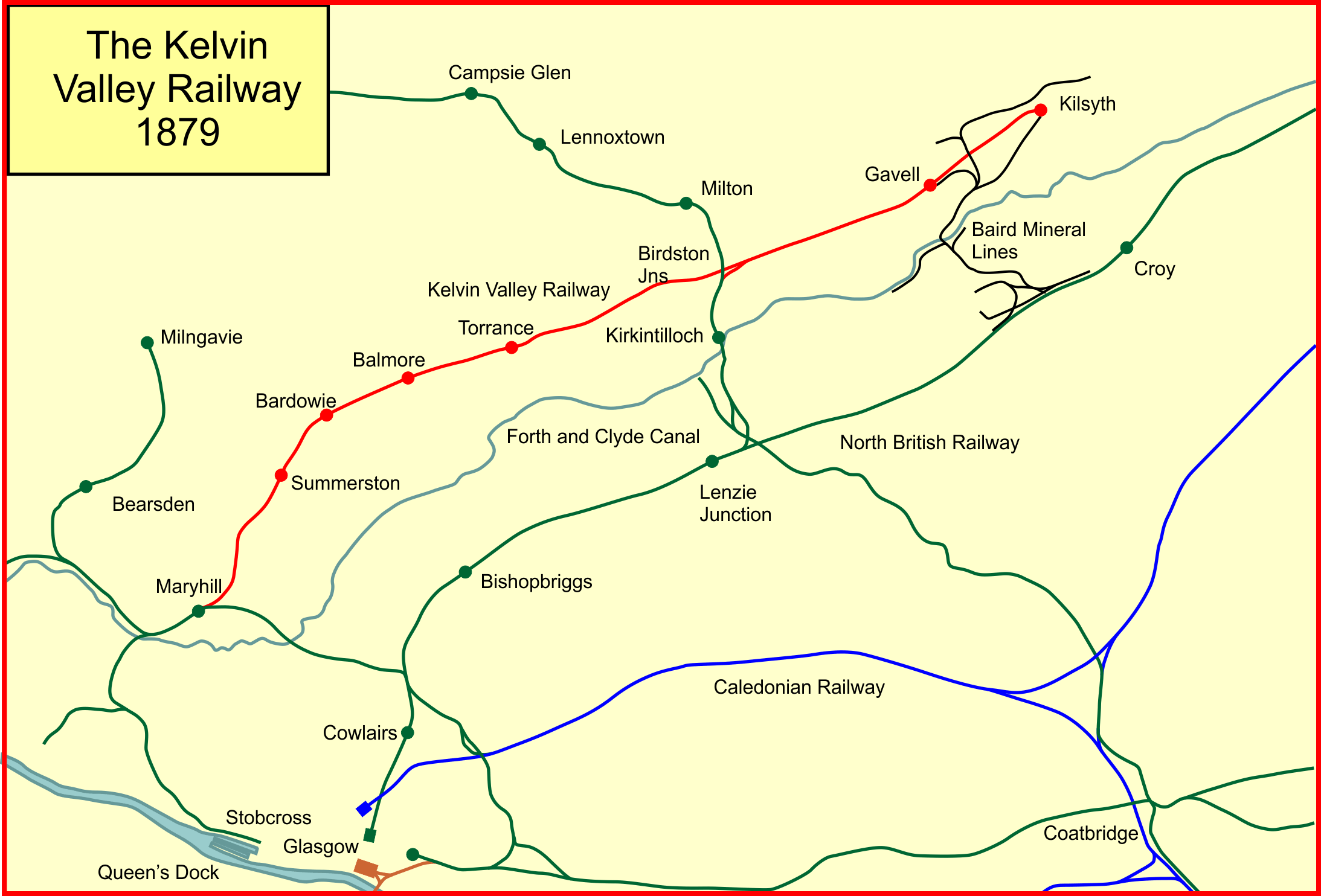
System map of the Kelvin Valley Railway

Opened by the North British Railway, it became part of the London and North Eastern Railway during the Grouping of 1923. The line passed to the Scottish Region of British Railways upon nationalisation. The line and station remained open to passengers until 1951. 1961 was the closure date for general goods and mineral freight traffic. The settlement at Twechar to the south of the station developed in size and its name was adopted instead of Gavell in 1924.

Although the closure of the Kelvin Valley line to passengers was on 20 July 1951 it remained as a through route until 1956; Goods traffic ceased to the east via Kilsyth for goods and mineral traffic in 1965.

== Infrastructure ==
The single platform and typical station building with its ticket office, waiting room, canopy, etc. stood on the southern side of this single track line with extensive sidings and cross over sidings on the same side serving the Baird's Private Railway as well as general goods. A long siding ran parallel to the main line from the east, ending close to the stationmaster's house that was present on the northern side of the line. A road bridge from Gavell crossed the line to the west of the platform end with the access to the goods yard to the east with its various associated buildings. A signal box is shown at the eastern end of the station, closed by 1966. The main station building stood at the western end of the platform. By 1957 the parallel siding had been lifted and the station building demolished.

Preceding station	Historical railways	Following station
Torrance	North British Railway; Kelvin Valley Railway	Kilsyth

== The site today ==
The station master's house survives as a private dwelling, but little else remains of the infrastructure on the station site.
