= Banknock =

Coordinates: 55.9875°N 03.95236°W

Banknock: Scottish Gaelic: Baile nan Cnoc
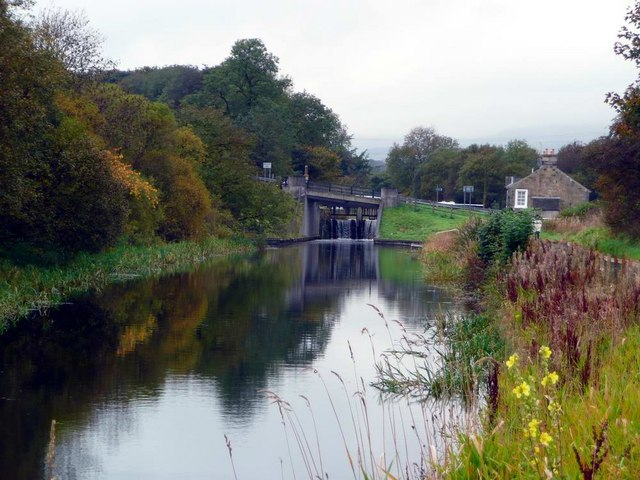
- Canal bridge and lock on the Forth and Clyde Canal at Banknock

- Location within the Falkirk council area
- Area: 0.28 sq mi (0.73 km^{2})
- Population: 2,400 (2020)
  - Density: 8,571/sq mi (3,309/km^{2})
- OS grid reference: NS783789
  - Edinburgh: 29.8 mi (48.0 km) ESE
  - London: 348 mi (560 km) SSE
- Community council: Banknock, Haggs and Longcroft
- Council area: Falkirk
- Lieutenancy area: Stirling and Falkirk
- Country: Scotland
- Sovereign state: United Kingdom
- Post town: BONNYBRIDGE
- Postcode district: FK4
- Dialling code: 01324
- Police: Scotland
- Fire: Scottish
- Ambulance: Scottish
- UK Parliament: Falkirk
- Scottish Parliament: Falkirk West
- Website: falkirk.gov.uk

Banknock (Scottish Gaelic: Baile nan Cnoc) is a village within the Falkirk council area in Central Scotland. The village is 6.7 miles (10.8 km) west-southwest of Falkirk, 3.9 miles (6.3 km) east-northeast of Kilsyth and 3.0 miles (4.8 km) north-northeast of Cumbernauld.

Banknock is located on the Bonny Water, north of the Forth and Clyde canal and west of the A80 road near to the boundary of Falkirk and North Lanarkshire councils. At the time of the 2001 census, Banknock had a population of 2,529 residents.

== History ==
There were coal mines along the north side of the valley. Cannerton Pit was one of these mines and its spoil heap, locally called 'the Bing', was a local landmark Before the railway was built, the Banknock mines were linked to the Forth & Clyde Canal by a wagonway which is still traceable today. Banknock once had a railway station on the Kilsyth and Bonnybridge Railway, a line which was built to serve these mines. When these mines closed, brickworks was set up on the Cannerton site. This busy industrial site was once an important feature but is now disused. Another employer in the village was the foundry at the Coneypark end of the village and owned by the Dobson family who lived in the Glenskirlie House Hotel. The Glenskirlie House Hotel has recently added a fake castle turret, and it has become a popular venue for weddings.

Bankier Whisky Distillery closed in 1928, and was finally demolished in 1981.

The part of the village where the Kilsyth Road crosses the Bush Burn was named Hollandbush, and it was the centre of the village with a post office, Co-operative shops and a licensed grocers shop registered as Andrew Brown & Son. Banknock was particularly busy on Sundays due to the strict post-war licensing laws, which dictated that only bona fide travellers may imbibe liquor on Sundays, and Kilsyth people would travel outwith their own environs in order to qualify.

== Local schools ==
The only school in Banknock is Bankier Primary School - which has been awarded three Green Flags for its efforts to recycle and reuse waste. Secondary school pupils attend Denny High School, the nearest secondary school. Catholic pupils attend St. Patrick's Primary School and St Modan's High School for primary and secondary education respectively.

== See also ==
- List of places in Falkirk
