= The Krankies =

Scottish comedy duo

Janette and Ian Tough
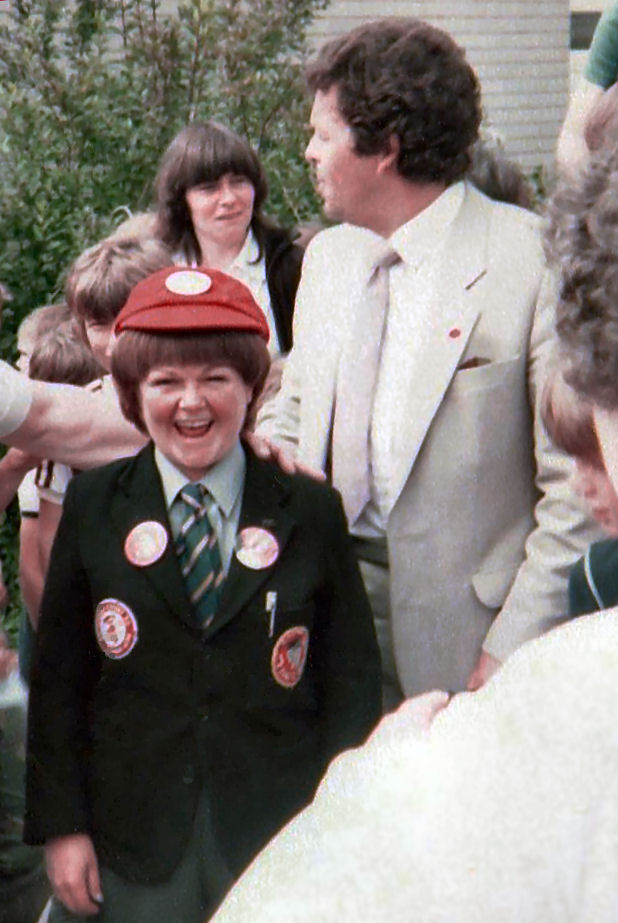
- Janette Tough as "Wee Jimmy Krankie" (looking at camera) and Ian Tough at a public event in the 1980s
- Born: Janette: 16 May 1947 (age 79); Queenzieburn, Stirlingshire, Scotland; Ian: 26 March 1947 (age 79); Clydebank, Dunbartonshire, Scotland
- Occupations: Television presenters, comedians, singers.
- Years active: 1974–2024

The Krankies are a Scottish comedy duo who enjoyed success as a cabaret act in the 1970s and on television in the 1980s, featuring in their own television shows and making pop records. Since this period, they have also regularly appeared in pantomime. The duo comprises Janette Tough (née Anderson) and her husband Ian. As the Krankies they portray schoolboy Wee Jimmy Krankie (Janette), and paternal figure Ian Krankie (Ian), though in their comedy act they also portray other characters. Beginning in the 1990s, they regularly appeared as the Krankies in episodes of the BBC comedy series French and Saunders. Wee Jimmy Krankie often used the catchphrase exclamation "Fandabidozi!"

== Biographies ==
Janette Anderson was born on 16 May 1947 in Queenzieburn, North Lanarkshire, Scotland, and Ian Tough on 26 March 1947 in Clydebank, Dunbartonshire. The two met in 1967, and were married in 1969.

== Career ==
The Krankies began their career as a comedy duo performing as various characters and working the comedy circuit. In 1978, they got their big break when they were given a spot on the Royal Variety Performance.

=== Television ===
During the 1980s, the duo were given roles in several television shows, including the BBC's stalwart children's entertainment series Crackerjack (1980–1982). Other appearances included The Krankies Klub (1983–1984), The Joke Machine (1985), The Krankies Elektronik Komik (1985–1987) and K.T.V for Border Television (1989–1991).

=== Music ===
From 1975 to 1984, the Krankies released a series of pop singles and an album, Fan–Dabi–Dozi, based on their catchphrase, which peaked at number 46 on the UK Singles Chart in February 1981.

Janette also appeared as Jimmy Krankie in the video for the 2007 Comic Relief single "500 Miles" with The Proclaimers, Brian Potter, Andy Pipkin and other celebrity stars.

=== Later career ===
The pair made recurring appearances in various French and Saunders series. Janette played, for example, Anakin Skywalker in the Star Wars: The Phantom Menace parody "The Phantom Millennium", and they both appeared in several other movie parodies throughout the series. Her most recent appearance was on the 2005 Christmas Special, in which she appeared in the mock theatre trailers for The Graduate and Chicago. She also appeared in the fifth series of Absolutely Fabulous playing both a midwife and nightmare baby in the episode "Book Clubbin".

In 1999, Janette Tough made a cameo appearance in a series 4 episode of Murder Most Horrid ("Elvis, Jesus, and Zack"). The episode concerns an artist who fakes his death to gain popularity. Janette is seen at the end of the episode, calling Dawn French's character for help faking her own death. The same year, she appeared as Janice, a friend of the character Petula in an episode of Dinnerladies.

In 2003, "Wee Jimmy Krankie" was voted "The Most Scottish Person in the World" by the readers of The Glasgow Herald. The following year, Janette was badly injured in a fall during a performance in the pantomime Jack and the Beanstalk, but made a full recovery.

In 2008, the Krankies appeared in a widely seen advertising campaign for STV Bingo. In 2007, they appeared in the video for the Comic Relief remake of The Proclaimers' song "I'm Gonna Be (500 Miles)", which featured Brian Potter and Andy Pipkin (fictional characters portrayed by Peter Kay and Matt Lucas respectively). On 12 June 2008 they appeared as guests on The Paul O'Grady Show, where they appeared in character at the beginning, before coming on later in the show as themselves. They were promoting a forthcoming tour in which they performed with other "semi-retired" acts such as Frank Carson, Brotherhood of Man, and Jimmy Cricket (all best known in the 1970s and 1980s).

On 14 December 2009, they once again were on the Paul O'Grady show for the pantomime special of "Sleeping Beauty", in which Janette played a hooker and Ian played a rampant camel. The duo appeared on ITV's daytime show Loose Women on 25 February 2010.

During the 2010 panto season, the Krankies made a re-appearance in Scottish pantomime alongside John Barrowman at the SECC for Aladdin. They appeared as the Police, with Janette parodying Susan Boyle and Lady Gaga, and making an appearance as Wee Jimmy Krankie. The Krankies returned alongside Barrowman in 2011 and soon became SECC veterans. After four years, Barrowman announced he would not return, and David Hasselhoff joined the Krankies for the 2015 pantomime. In 2016, they joined Barrowman again in pantomime at Birmingham Hippodrome, and in 2017 at Manchester Opera House.

In December 2011, during an appearance on BBC Radio Scotland's Stark Talk programme, Ian Tough revealed the couple had enjoyed a colourful sex life at the time when their profile was at its highest in the 1980s, admitting to episodes of swinging. He told the story of one amorous incident where the pair almost sailed off course to France in a small boat while partaking in a sex act.

In December 2015, Absolutely Fabulous: The Movie sparked controversy and accusations of racism when it was announced that Janette Tough would be playing a male Japanese character named Huki Muki. Korean American comedian Margaret Cho accused Janette Tough of "yellowface", which she described as "when white people portray Asian people. And unfortunately it's happening in this film." Upon release of the film it became apparent that the character was not, in fact, Japanese but Scottish. When asked about the controversy Jennifer Saunders replied "the whole film is about people being what they're not, Huki Muki is a brand, she is the designer and she looks a bit Japanese, but the moment she opens her mouth she's from Glasgow. There's no yellow makeup..."

On 24 December 2015, the Krankies appeared on the BBC One programme Pointless, losing out to Su Pollard and Jeffrey Holland who reached the final.

In August 2018, they appeared in the third series of BBC's travel documentary The Real Marigold Hotel.

In 2019, they appeared on Harry Hill's Alien Fun Capsule.

On 8 April 2022 they appeared on GB News's Mark Dolan Tonight on Dolan's Mark Meets segment. They also appeared as panellists on Dolan's show on 3 July 2022.
