= Dennyloanhead railway station =

Disused railway station in Longcroft, Falkirk

Dennyloanhead

General information
- Location: Longcroft, Falkirk; Scotland
- Coordinates: 55.9936°N 3.9263°W
- Grid reference: NS799795
- Platforms: 1

Other information
- Status: Disused

History
- Original company: Kilsyth and Bonnybridge Railway
- Pre-grouping: North British Railway
- Post-grouping: LNER

Key dates
- 2 July 1888: Opened
- 1 February 1935: Closed
Location

Dennyloanhead railway station served the village of Longcroft, Falkirk, Scotland from 1888 to 1935 on the Kilsyth and Bonnybridge Railway.

== History ==
The station opened 2 July 1888 by the Kilsyth and Bonnybridge Railway. The goods yard was on the east side as well as sidings that served Knowehead Colliery to the north. The station closed 1 February 1935.

Preceding station	Disused railways	Following station
Banknock; Line and station closed	Kilsyth and Bonnybridge Railway	Bonnybridge Central; Line and station closed
