= Twechar =

Village in East Dunbartonshire, Scotland

Coordinates: 55.951°N 4.085°W

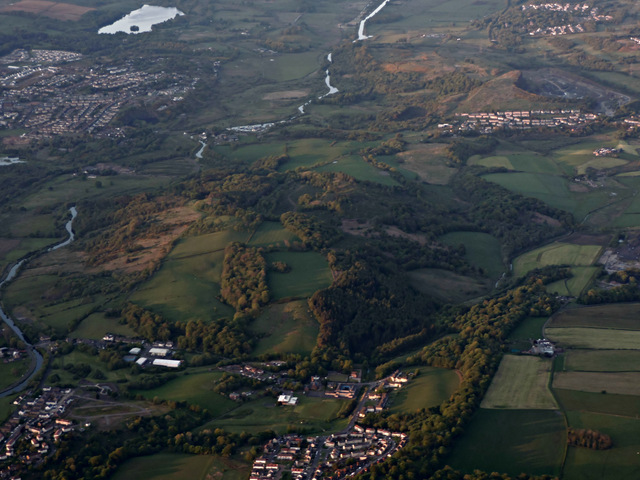
- Twechar and Bar Hill

- Location within East Dunbartonshire
- Population: 1,340 (2020)
- OS grid reference: NS698754
- Council area: East Dunbartonshire
- Lieutenancy area: Dunbartonshire
- Country: Scotland
- Sovereign state: United Kingdom
- Post town: GLASGOW
- Postcode district: G65
- Dialling code: 01236
- Police: Scotland
- Fire: Scottish
- Ambulance: Scottish
- UK Parliament: Cumbernauld and Kirkintilloch
- Scottish Parliament: Strathkelvin and Bearsden

Twechar is a small former mining village historically in Dunbartonshire and administered by the council area of East Dunbartonshire, Scotland close to the boundary with North Lanarkshire. It lies between the larger towns of Cumbernauld, Kilsyth and Kirkintilloch. The Forth and Clyde Canal runs close to the village to the north, and closely follows the line of the Antonine Wall. There are visible remains of the wall on Bar Hill and the Roman Fort is a local tourist attraction.

== History ==
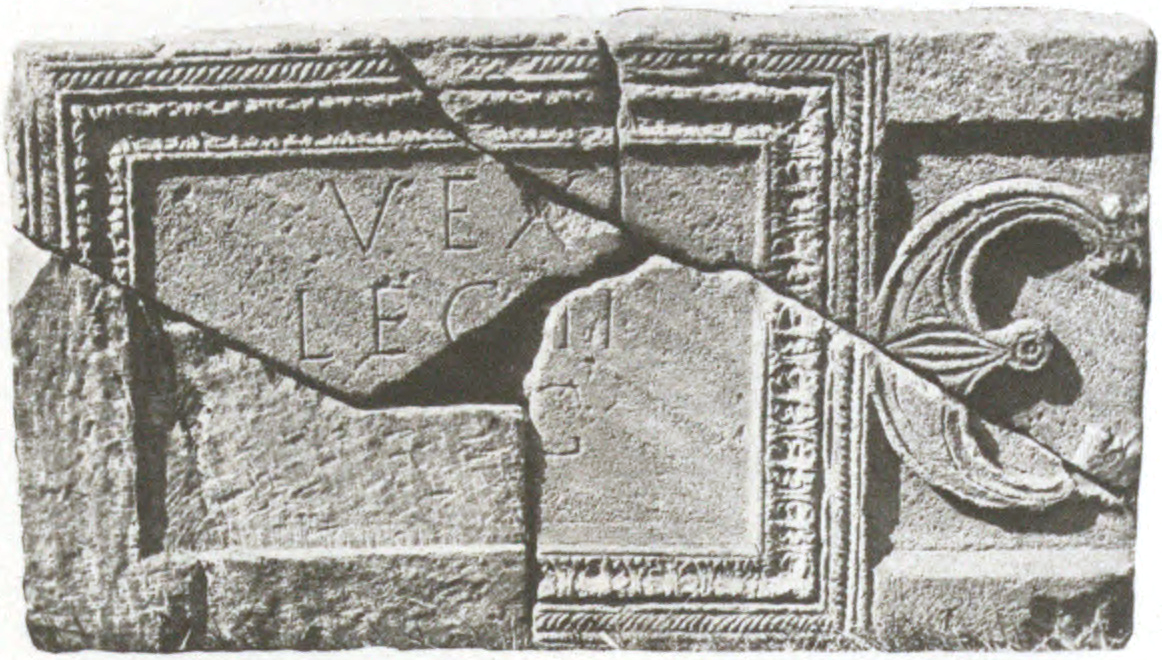
RIB 2180. Tablet of the Second Legion from Shirva, Twechar.

The etymology of the name is probably ‘causeway or pavement’. Several old documents show Twechar with various spellings including maps by Charles Ross, and William Roy. There is a long history of mining activity in the Twechar locality but it was not until the coming of William Baird & Co. to the area, about 1860, that a close-knit mining community was created. Before that time Shirva was described as having the best farm land in the parish. Several tombstones from a possible Roman Cemetery were found at Shirva House. A legionary slab was also discovered. In 2020 a replica of the Eastermains stone was installed in Twechar. It was found on near the discovery site of the 20th Legion's slab: on Eastermains Farm (which adjoins Whitehill), west of Inchbelly Bridge, east of Kirkintilloch and is often associated with Auchendavy. It has been scanned and a video produced. It is similar to two other distance slabs of the Sixth Legion.

== Mining ==
Pits were sunk at Twechar and Gartshore and a row of workers' houses was built on the south bank of the Forth and Clyde canal, just east of Twechar Bridge.

The coal mining industry begun by the Bairds in the 1860s lasted for just over a century. Twechar No.1 Pit, on the north bank of the canal to the east of Twechar Bridge, closed in 1964, while Gartshore 9/11, the very last colliery in the area, was shut down in 1968. Thereafter some Twechar men travelled each day to collieries such as Bedlay and Cardowan in Lanarkshire, until they too were closed, during the early 1980s.

Baird & Co. provided rail connections to their local pits at an early date but for many years much of their coal was transported to market by canal boat. During the 1860s the canal company permitted Baird & Co. to place a railway swing bridge over the canal, a short distance to the west of Twechar road bridge, for the purpose of forming a connection between collieries on either side of the canal. As part of the deal the coal company agreed to transport a proportion of its coal by canal although this requirement lapsed early in the twentieth century. However, the swing bridge continued in use until the mid-1960s, its hand-winding apparatus having been made redundant on 1 January 1963, when the canal closed.

== Housing ==
Old postcard of Barrhill Rows

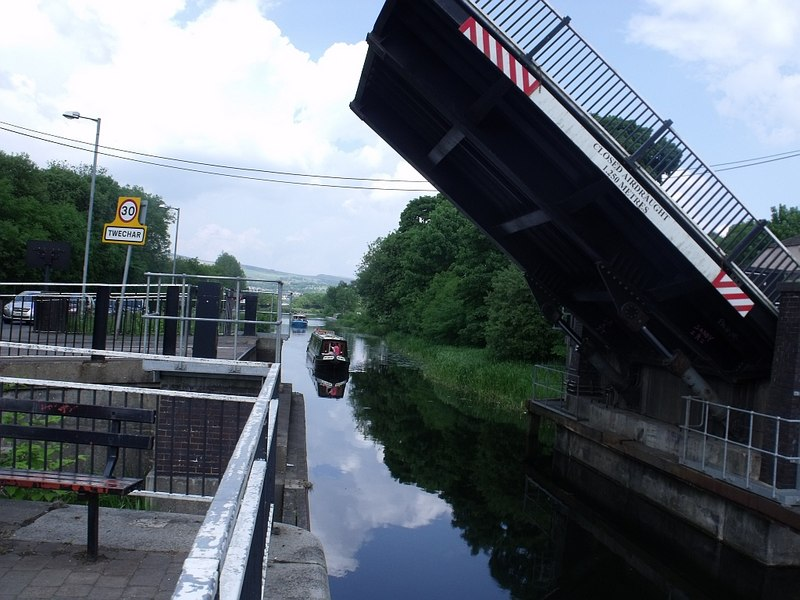
Unsafe Twechar Swing Bridge prior to repair

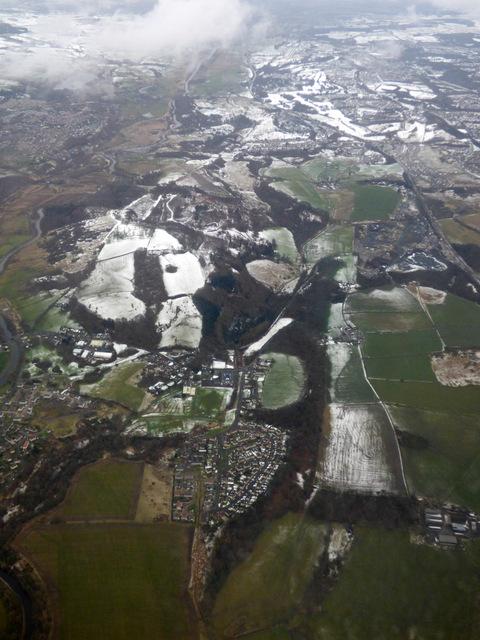
Twechar from the air

The original housing provided by William Baird & Co soon proved inadequate and around 1880 the Barrhill Rows were constructed at right angles to Main Street, on its western side.

At first there were four rows, supplemented by two more about 1900, by which date the total number of dwellings in the rows was 160. The row nearest the canal included a Gartsherrie Co-operative shop and accordingly was known as the 'Store Row'.

Initially the houses had no sanitation and were lit by paraffin lamps. Communal wash houses were provided at intervals along each row. Most of the houses were of the two-apartment (room & kitchen) variety.

A great improvement was made in 1925, when Baird & Co. (in response to considerable pressure from the miners themselves, over the years) provided good quality modern housing for their mine workers at Burnbrae, Annieston, Sunnyhill and adjacent streets. There were 200 dwellings in all, some two-apartment and some three-apartment, built in two-story blocks of four. They were provided with bathrooms and electric lighting. When these houses were built the old row on the south bank of the canal was demolished. The Barrhill Rows, however, lasted until 1957. The Baird houses of 1925 are currently being demolished and little remains of Burnbrae, Whitelaw Terrace, Shirva lea and Merryflats ( Nov 09 ). Later housing was provided by Dunbartonshire County Council at MacDonald Crescent (1939), Alexander Avenue (1948) and Kelvin View (about 1955).

In the 2001 census, the population was recorded as 1,363, a drop of over 9% from the previous census in 1991.

== Schools ==
The village also had its own secondary education in Twechar School (now Twechar Primary School) until secondary schools in Cumbernauld and Kirkintilloch opened and secondary age pupils were sent by bus to these schools.

Pupils from Twechar Primary now go on to further education at the new state of the art Kirkintilloch High School. The Roman Catholic children are taught in Kirkintilloch for their primary and at the new St Ninian's High School, Kirkintilloch for their secondary education. the primary school has an estimate of 70-90 pupils ( 2010 .

== Transport ==
Twechar railway station on the Kelvin Valley Railway served the village and area from 1878 to 1951. It was named Gavell from 1878 until 1924.

== Redevelopment ==
The war memorial on Twechar's Main Street.

The reopening of the Forth & Clyde Canal, in May 2001, brought with it great opportunities for the development of Twechar, which lies close to the canal's half-way point.

Currently the village is undergoing a regeneration, EDC and private enterprise have put forward proposals to build approximately 200+ new houses, older housing stock in the "National Coal Board" scheme will be demolished from late 2007 onwards if the plan goes ahead.

Newer small business units have also been built in the small enterprise park opposite the war memorial, and an application for new housing has been raised with the council for new housing next to Kelvin View (November 2009). As of February 2012, residents have been moving into their new homes at the new Kelvin View housing site near the top end of Davison Crescent, the tenants seem very happy with their new homes.

Various new walkways have also been made, in and around the village and the glen.

The local leisure centre has undergone an extensive renovation and has been re-titled the "Twechar Healthy Living and Enterprise Centre." Negotiations to obtain a GP have been ongoing for some time.

An area to the rear of the former Masonic Hall (Lodge Barrhill Twechar 1444) has already been developed for boating purposes on the canal, a slipway and floating pontoon are already in-situ.

== Churches ==
There is a Church of Scotland congregation, Twechar Parish Church, which shares a minister with Banton. The Roman Catholic villagers are served by St. John of the Cross Chapel in Twechar. There is also a Church of the Nazarene.

== Roman tombstones ==
Several Roman tombstones have been found at Shirva. Several of them have been scanned and videos have been produced. They are sometimes connected with Auchendavy since Wester Shirva Farm is about halfway between there and Bar Hill. Archaeological excavations at Bar Hill have in turn revealed a formerly unknown early Roman 'marching' camp to the south of the Fort, and an artesian well in the Commandant's courtyard which has produced numerous finds, presumably hastily tossed in by the Romans as they abandoned the Fort and wall. Twechar has in fact 3 Roman camps – both aforementioned sites at Bar Hill and another in the farmer's field adjacent to St John of the Cross.

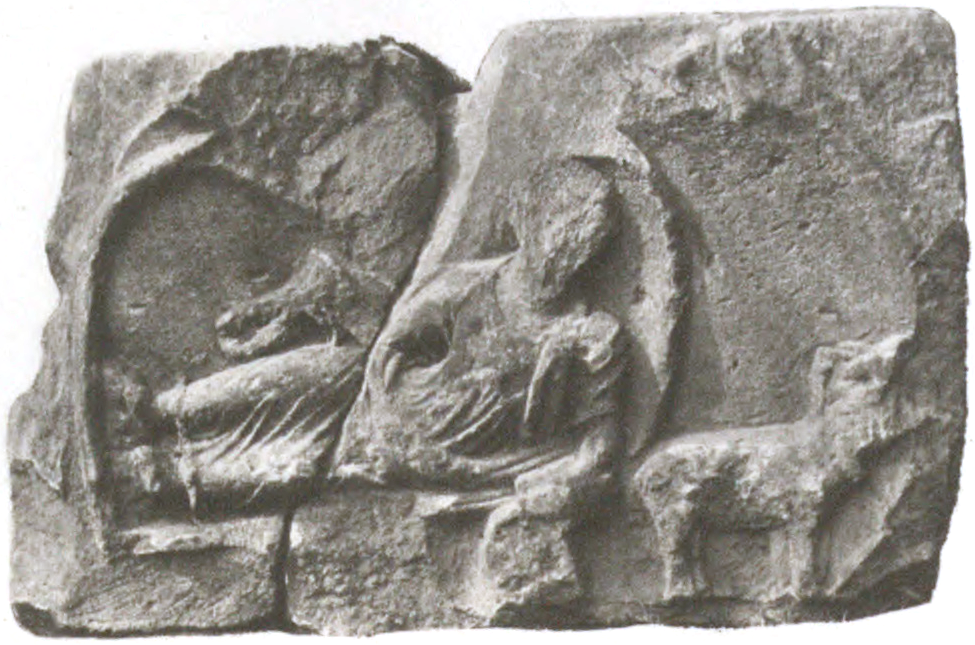
RS 37. A sepulchral banquet. Video.

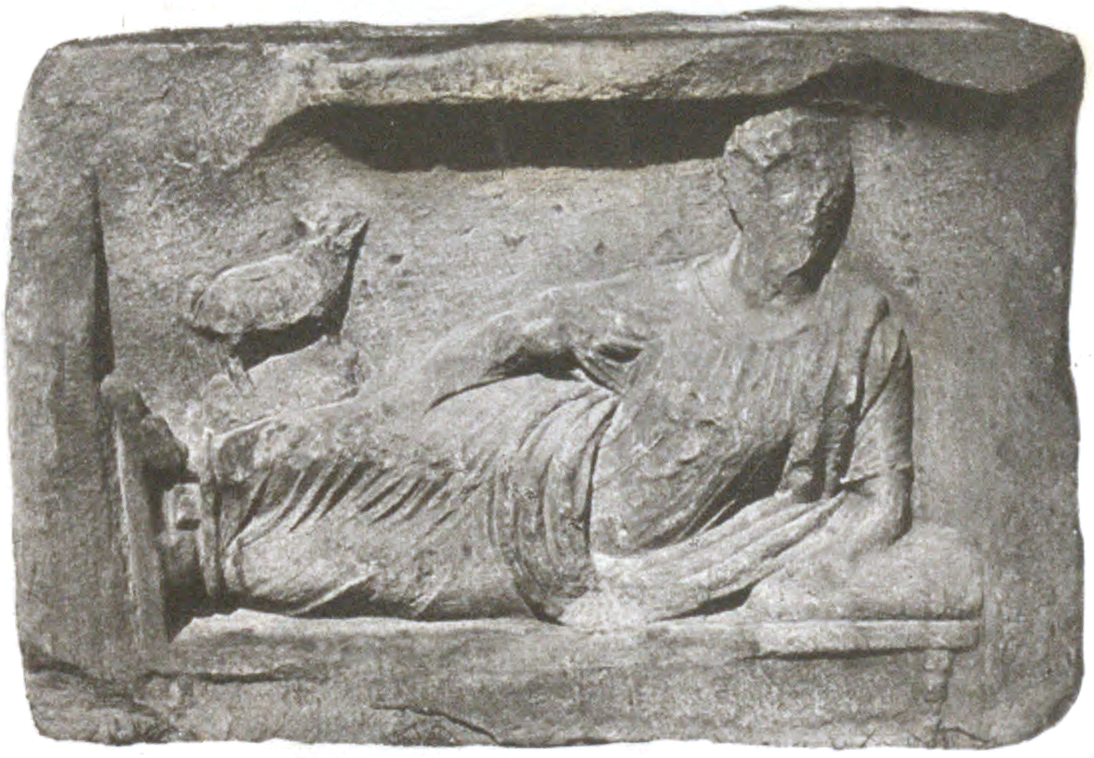
RS 38. Another sepulchral banquet. Video.

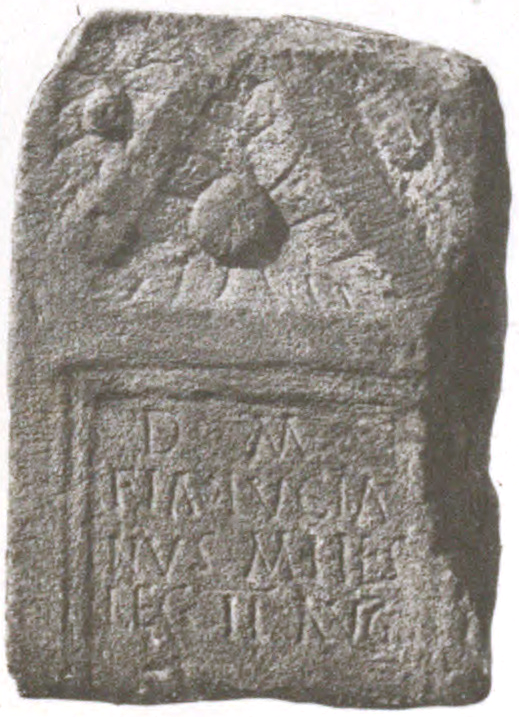
RIB 2181. Tombstone for Flavius Lucianus. Video.

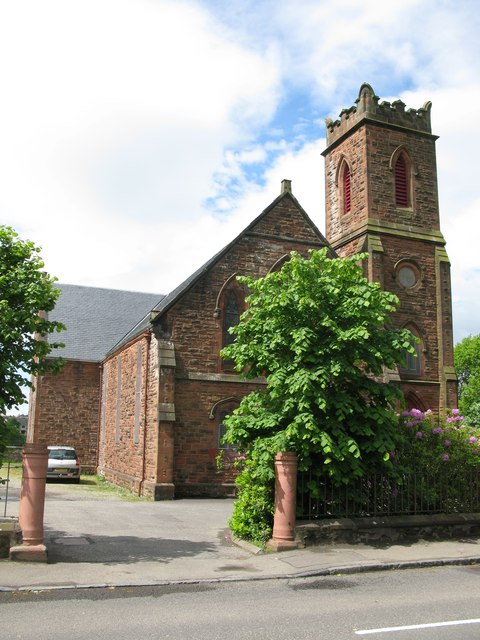
Twechar Parish Church

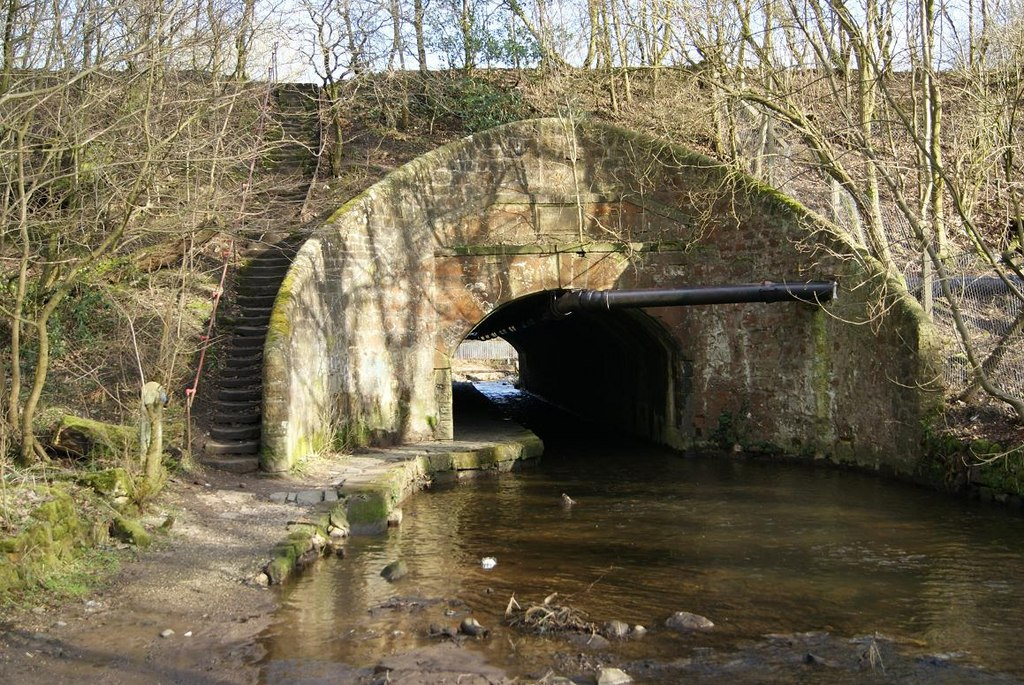
Shirva Pend

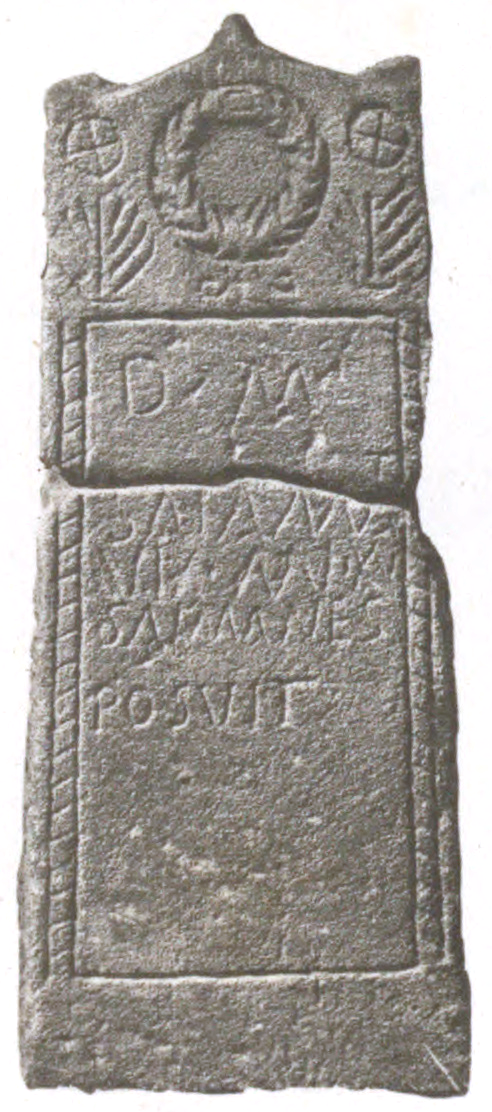
RIB 2182. Tombstone for Salmanes Video.

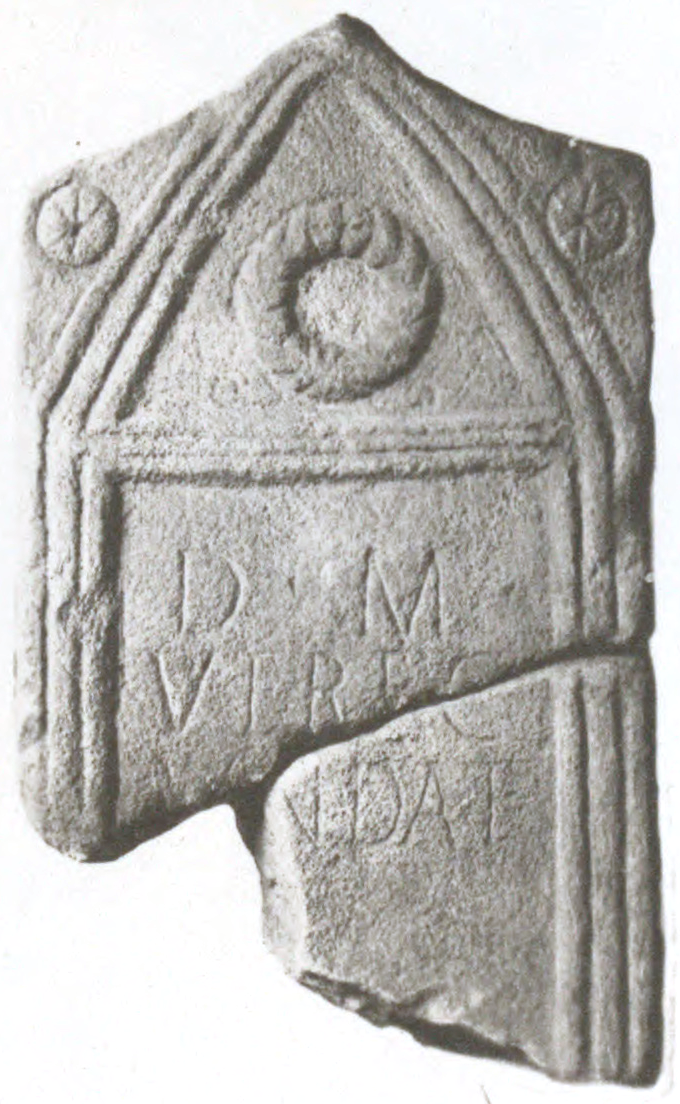
RIB 2183. Tombstone for Verecunda. Video.

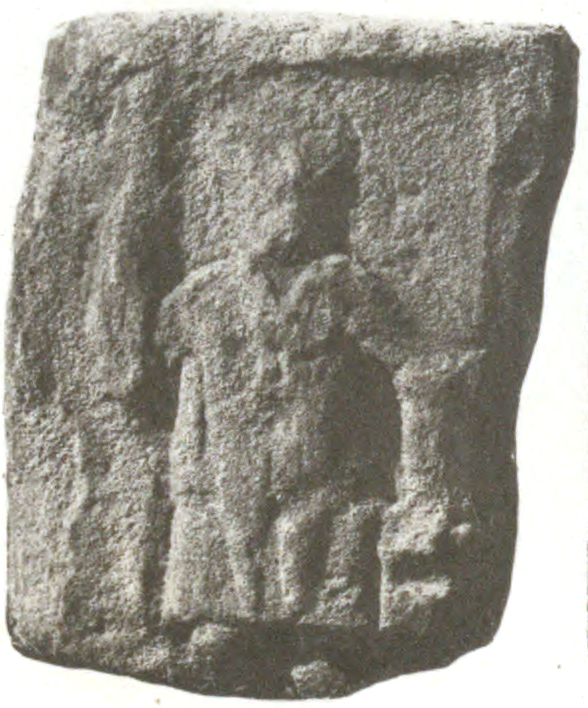
Fragment of tombstone from Shirva, Twechar. Video.

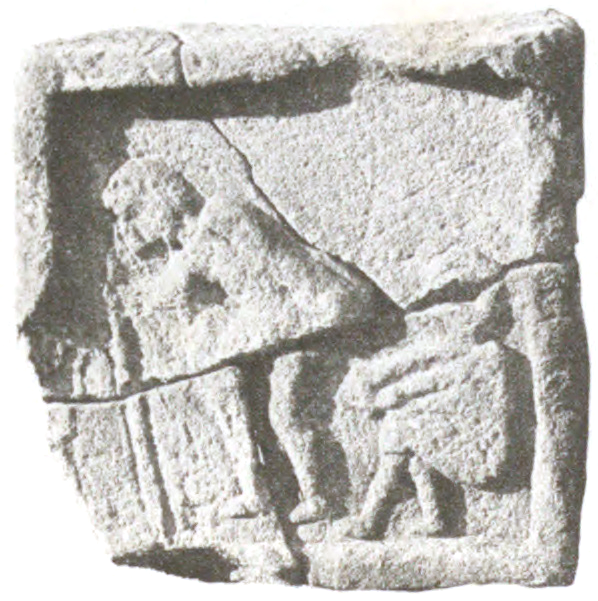
Stone fragment possibly from Shirva, Twechar

Twechar tombstones.
