= K.T.V =

- Also known as: Krankies Television
- Genre: Children
- Starring: The Krankies
- Country of origin: United Kingdom
- Original language: English
- No. of series: 3
- No. of episodes: 21

Production
- Running time: 30 minutes
- Production company: Border Television

Original release
- Network: ITV
- Release: 18 July 1989 – 13 May 1991

This was the Krankies second solo attempt at a children's television show since Crackerjack!, this time on ITV.

== Series ==
Each series had 7 Episodes.

- Series One; 18 July – 29 August 1989
- Series Two; 11 July – 29 August 1990
- Series Three; 18 March – 13 May 1991

Episodes were repeated in 1992 and 1993.
