= The Krankies Klub =

- Genre: Children
- Starring: The Krankies
- Country of origin: United Kingdom
- Original language: English
- No. of series: 2
- No. of episodes: 14

Production
- Running time: 30 minutes

Original release
- Network: ITV
- Release: 26 December 1982 – 6 October 1984

The Krankies Klub was the Krankies' first solo attempt at a family variety show since Crackerjack.

== Series ==
- The Krankies Christmas Club 26 Dec 1982
- Series One 6 Episodes: 10 September – 15 October 1983
- The Krankies at Christmas 24 Dec 1983
- Series Two 6 Episodes: 1 September – 6 October 1984.
