= The Krankies Elektronik Komik =

- Genre: Children
- Starring: The Krankies
- Country of origin: United Kingdom
- Original language: English
- No. of series: 3
- No. of episodes: 18

Production
- Running time: 30 minutes

Original release
- Network: BBC
- Release: 26 December 1985 – 29 August 1987

The Krankies Elektronik Komik is a British family variety television series presented by the Krankies. The programme also featured magic performed by the Great Soprendo and live performances by pop bands. It was the duo's third television series as headliners and their first for the BBC. The programme ran for three series.

== Series ==
- Series One: 6 Episodes: 30 Nov 1985 - 4 Jan 1986
- Series Two: 6 Episodes: 5 September - 17 October 1986
- Series Three: 6 Episodes: 25 July - 29 Aug 1987
