= Bar Hill Fort =

Roman fort in East Dunbartonshire, Scotland

Coordinates: 55.959°N 4.072°W

- Barr Hill
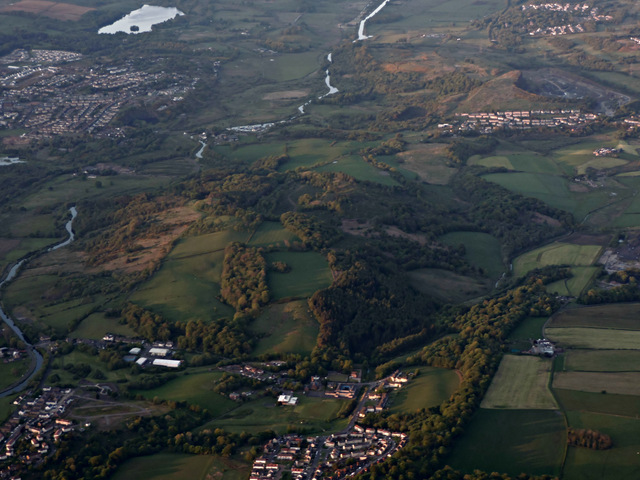
- Bar Hill and Twechar with Kilsyth and Croy in the background
- Interactive map of Bar Hill Fort
- Location: East Dunbartonshire, Scotland

History
- Built: Antoninus Pius

Site notes
- Excavation dates: 1902–1905, 1978–1982, 1982-1984
- Archaeologists: George Macdonald, Alexander Park

Designations

Scheduled monument
- Official name: Antonine Wall, Bar Hill
- Type: Prehistoric domestic and defensive: fort (includes hill fort and promontory fort), Roman: Antonine Wall; fort
- Designated: 2 March 1961
- Reference no.: SM90008

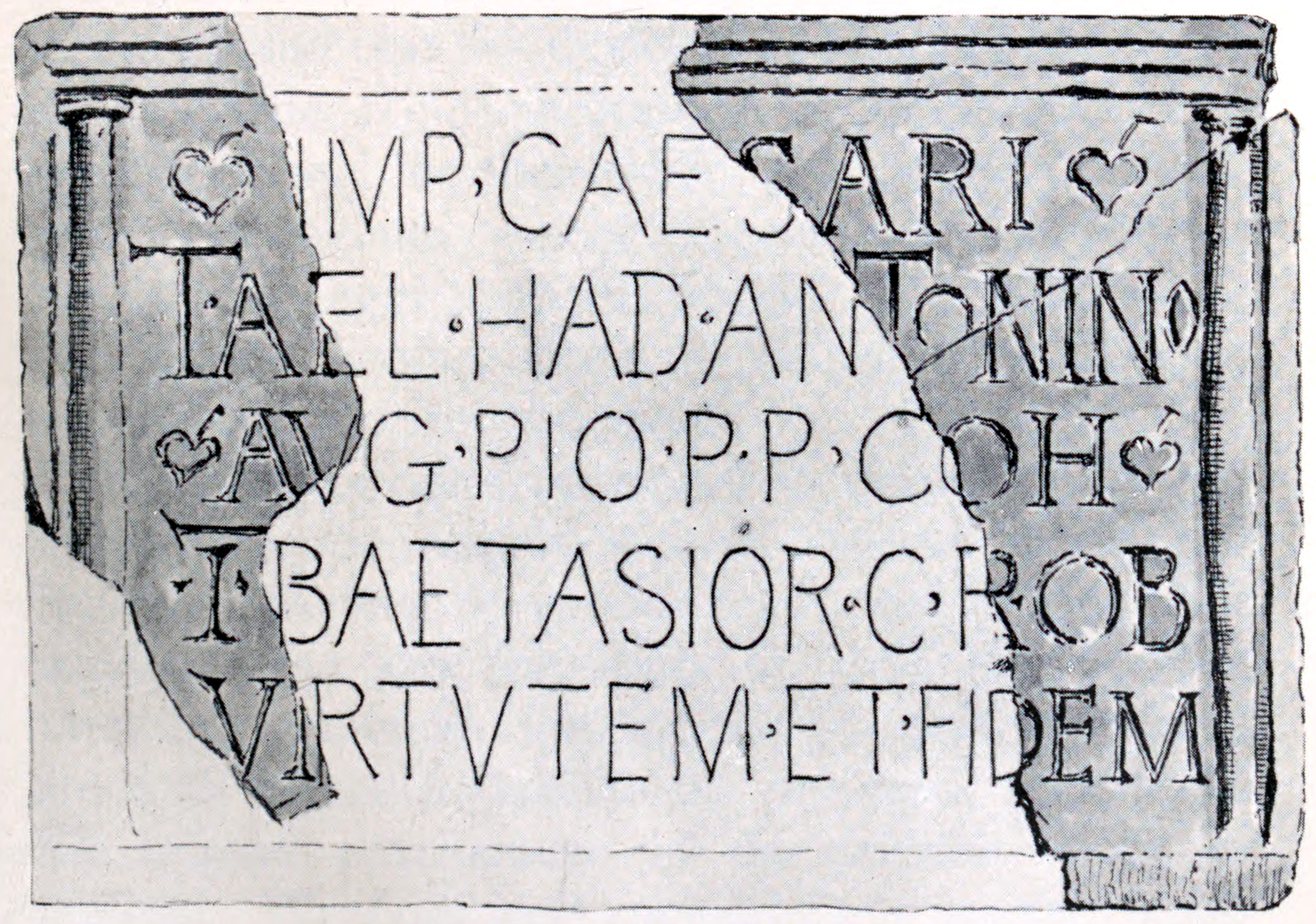
RIB 2170. Honorific Building Inscription of the First Cohort of Baetasians. It has been scanned and a video produced.

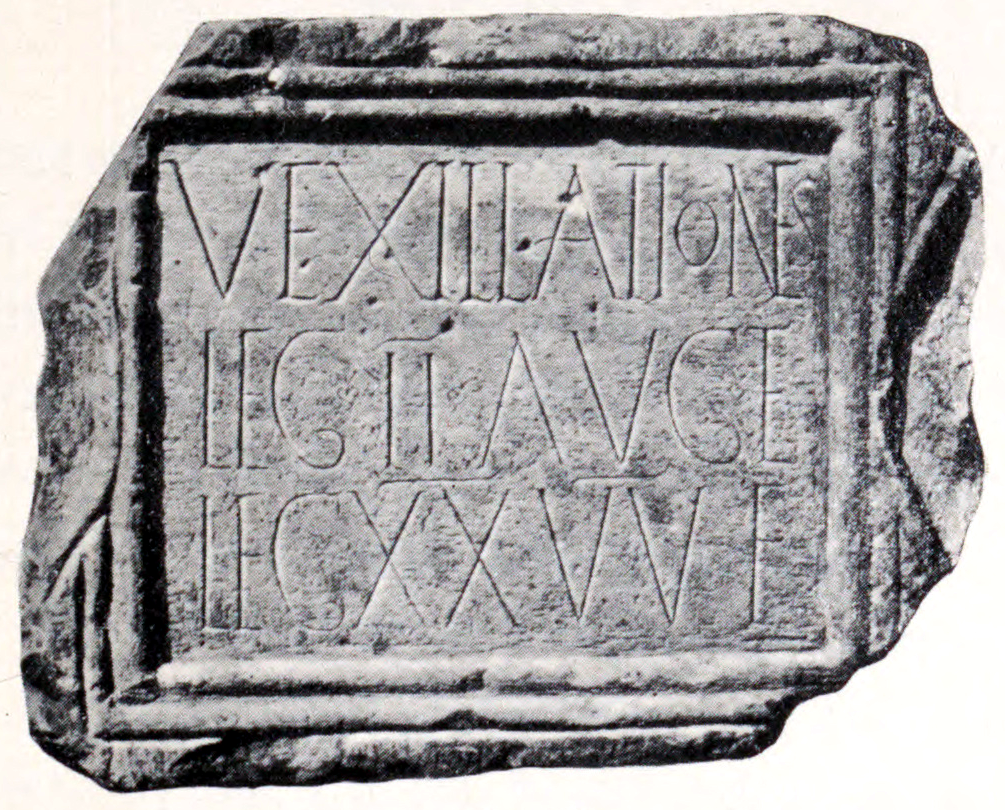
RIB 2171. Building Inscription of the Second and Twentieth Legions.

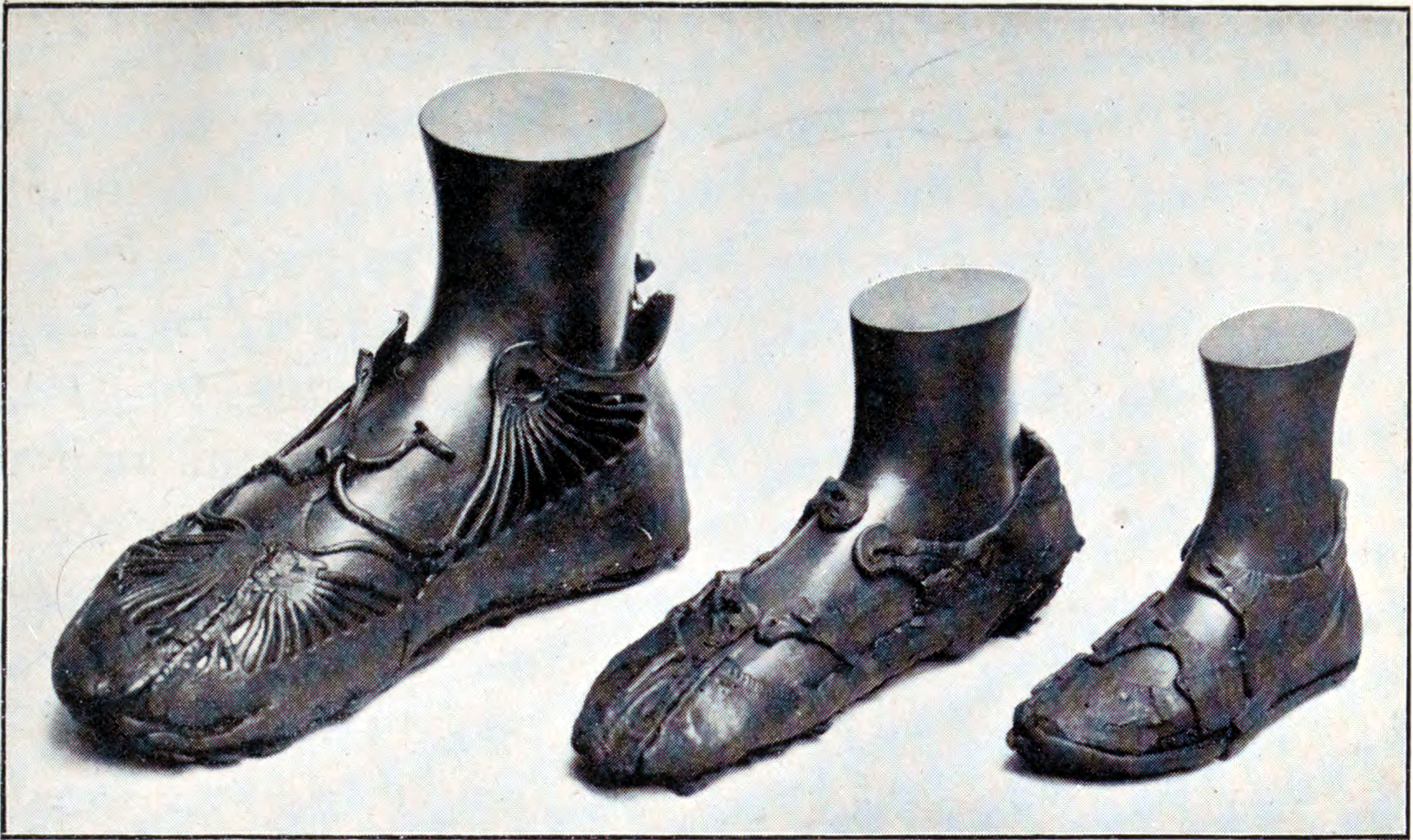
A man's, a woman's and a child's shoe from Bar Hill.

Bar Hill Fort was a Roman fort on the Antonine Wall in Scotland. It was built around the year 142 CE. Older maps and documents sometimes spell the name as Barr Hill. A computer generated fly around for the site has been produced. Lidar scans have been done along the length of the wall including Bar Hill. Sir George Macdonald wrote about the excavation of the site. Many other artefacts have also been found at Shirva, about a mile away on the other side of Twechar.

Many Roman forts along the wall held garrisons of around 500 men. Larger forts like Castlecary and Birrens had a nominal cohort of 1000 men but probably sheltered women and children as well although the troops were not allowed to marry. There is likely too to have been large communities of civilians around the site.

An altar (RIB 2167) to Silvanus was found in 1895 on Bar Hill. It's thought to have originated from a small shrine outside the fort. The altar is now kept in the Hunterian Museum, Glasgow along with others like the one found at Castlecary. A 43 foot deep well was discovered at the site. Several items were recovered from the well; possibly they were dumped there when the site was abandoned. Shoes from men, women and children were found leading to suggestions of family life. Other recovered items include an altar, bones, shells and coins. Structural materials like building columns, wooden beams were found as was part of the pulley of the well. Videos of some reconstructed objects like a barrel, a window. and various columns have been produced as well as one of a bust of Silenus.

Bar Hill Fort was one of over a dozen forts built along the Antonine Wall from around 140 AD. These follow a short route across Scotland’s central belt which was largely followed in the 18th century when constructing the Forth and Clyde canal. On the south-facing slope of the hill is the headquarters; it is the biggest building that can be seen. The remains of a Roman bathhouse can also be observed.

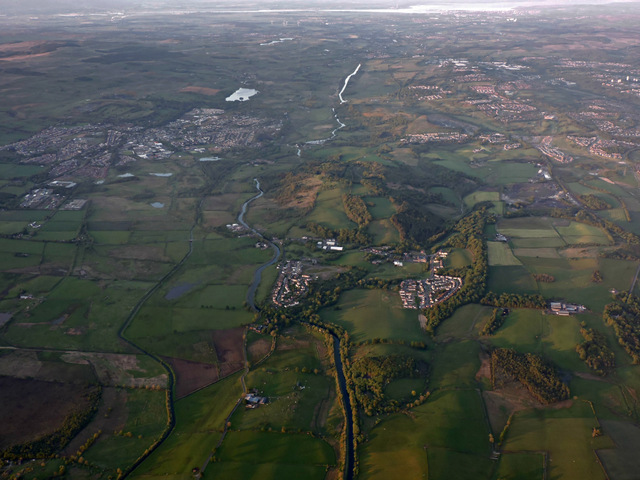
Bar Hill as seen from the air looking east from Twechar towards the Firth of Forth along the line of the Forth and Clyde canal. Kilsyth is on the left and Cumbernauld is on the right. Castlehill has a similar aerial view to the west.

== Gallery ==
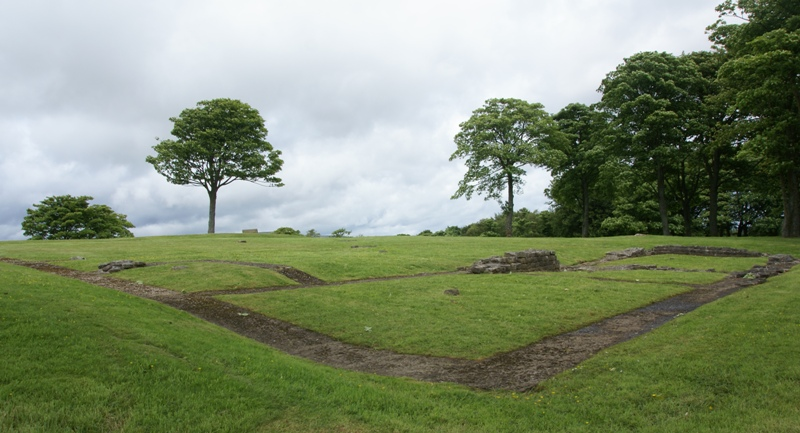
principia (headquarters)

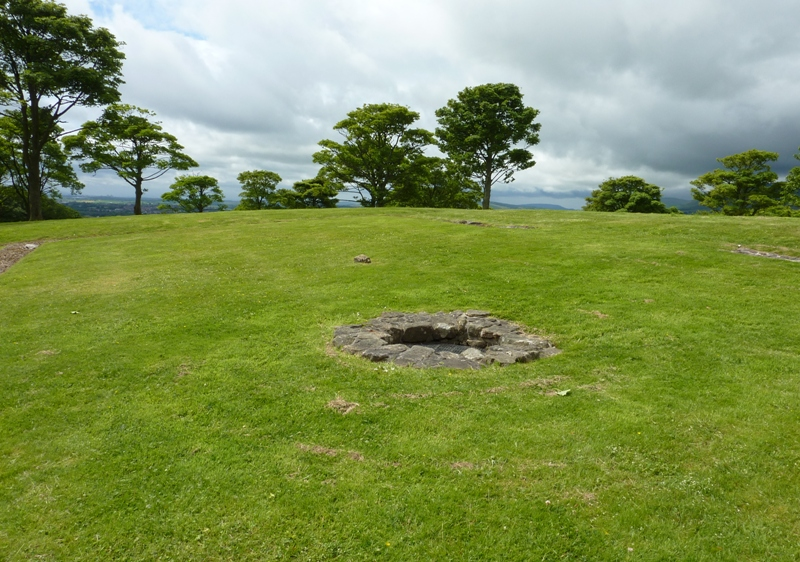
well in courtyard

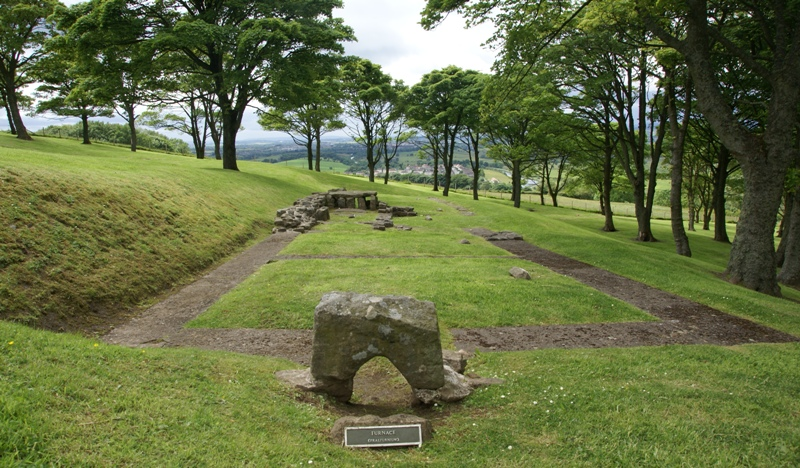
bath house from east

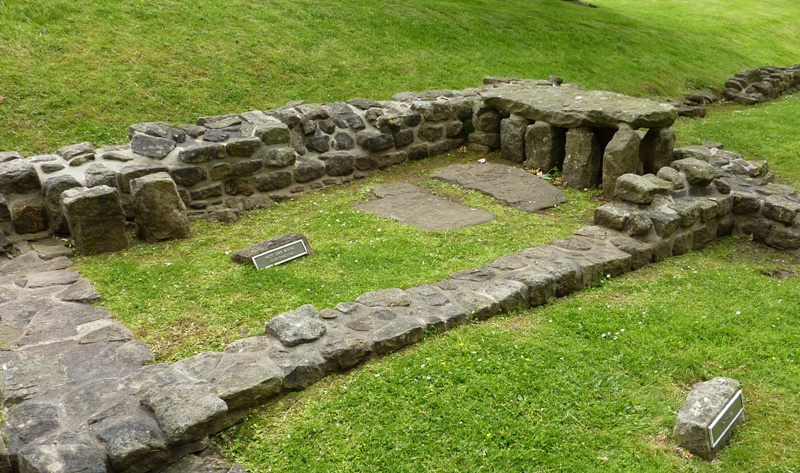
laconicum

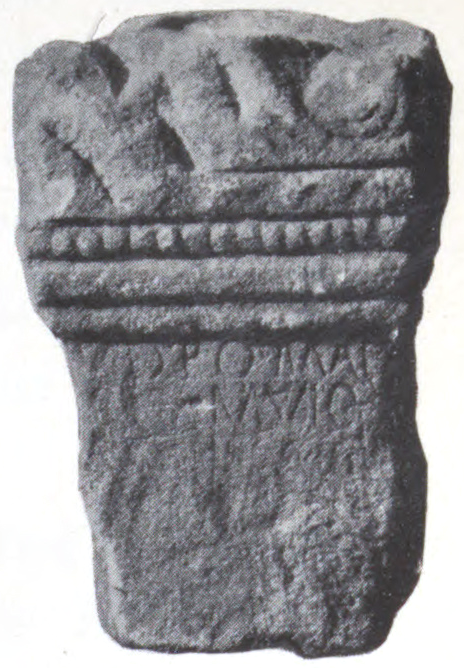
RIB 2166. Altar dedicated to Mars Camulus.

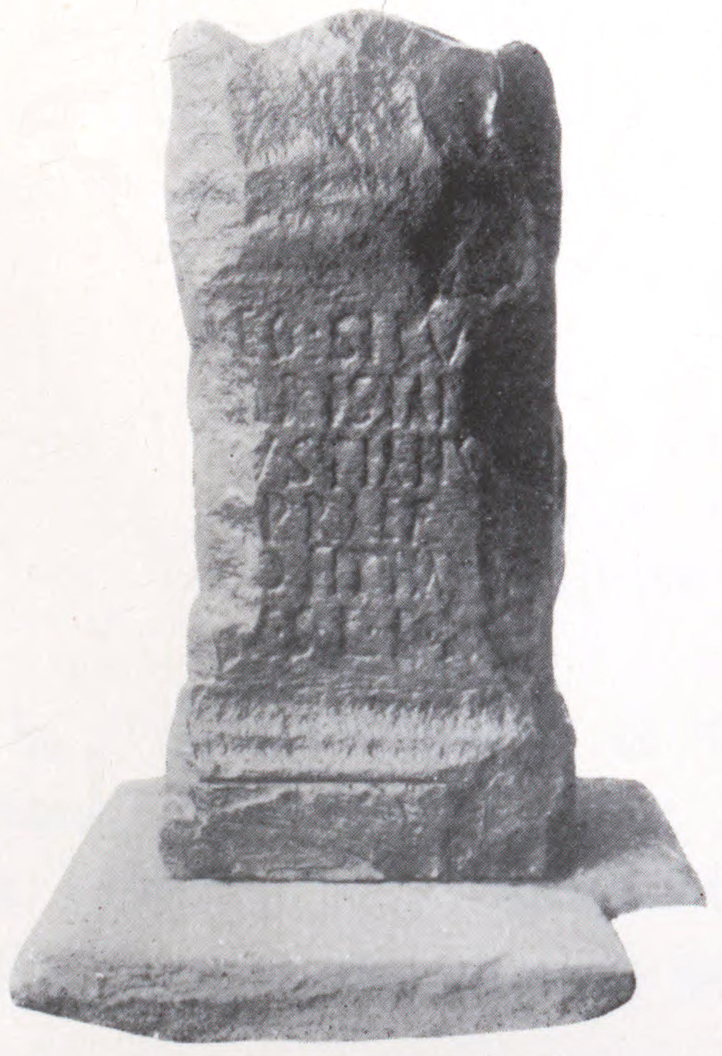
RIB 2167. Altar dedicated to Silvanus. On a plinth. It has been scanned and a video produced.

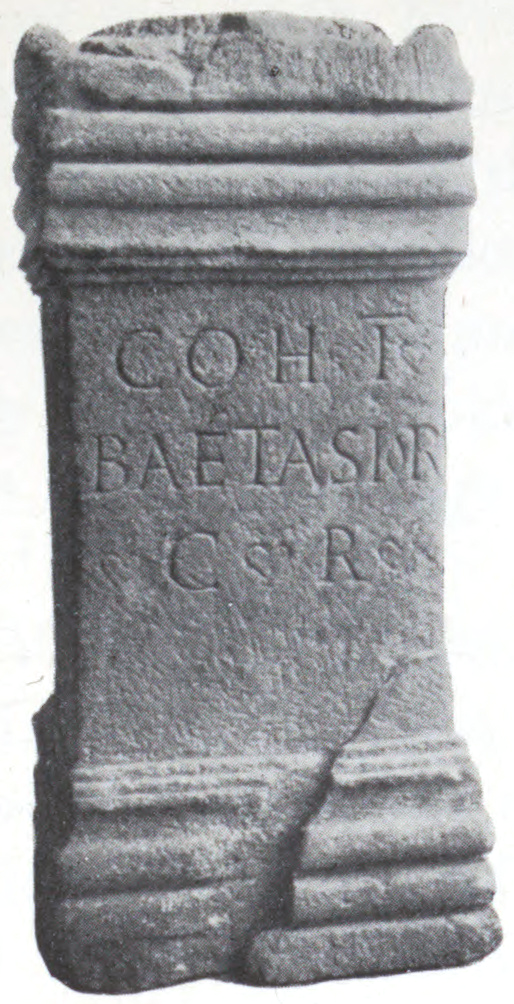
RIB 2169. Altar dedicated by First Cohort of Baetasians. Their name also appears on an altar from Old Kilpatrick.

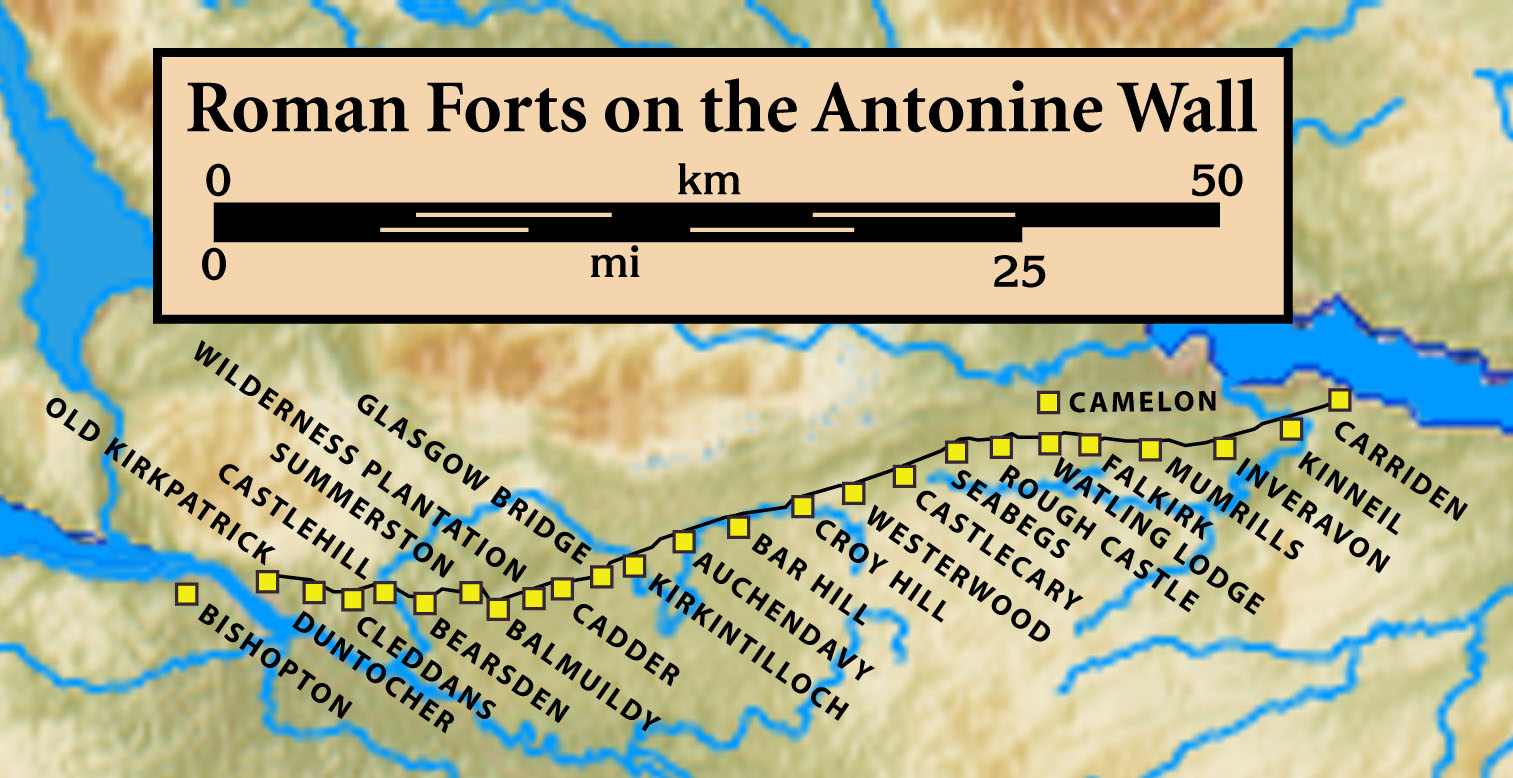
Forts and Fortlets associated with the Antonine Wall from west to east: Bishopton, Old Kilpatrick, Duntocher, Cleddans, Castlehill, Bearsden, Summerston, Balmuildy, Wilderness Plantation, Cadder, Glasgow Bridge, Kirkintilloch, Auchendavy, Bar Hill, Croy Hill, Westerwood, Castlecary, Seabegs, Rough Castle, Camelon, Watling Lodge, Falkirk, Mumrills, Inveravon, Kinneil, Carriden

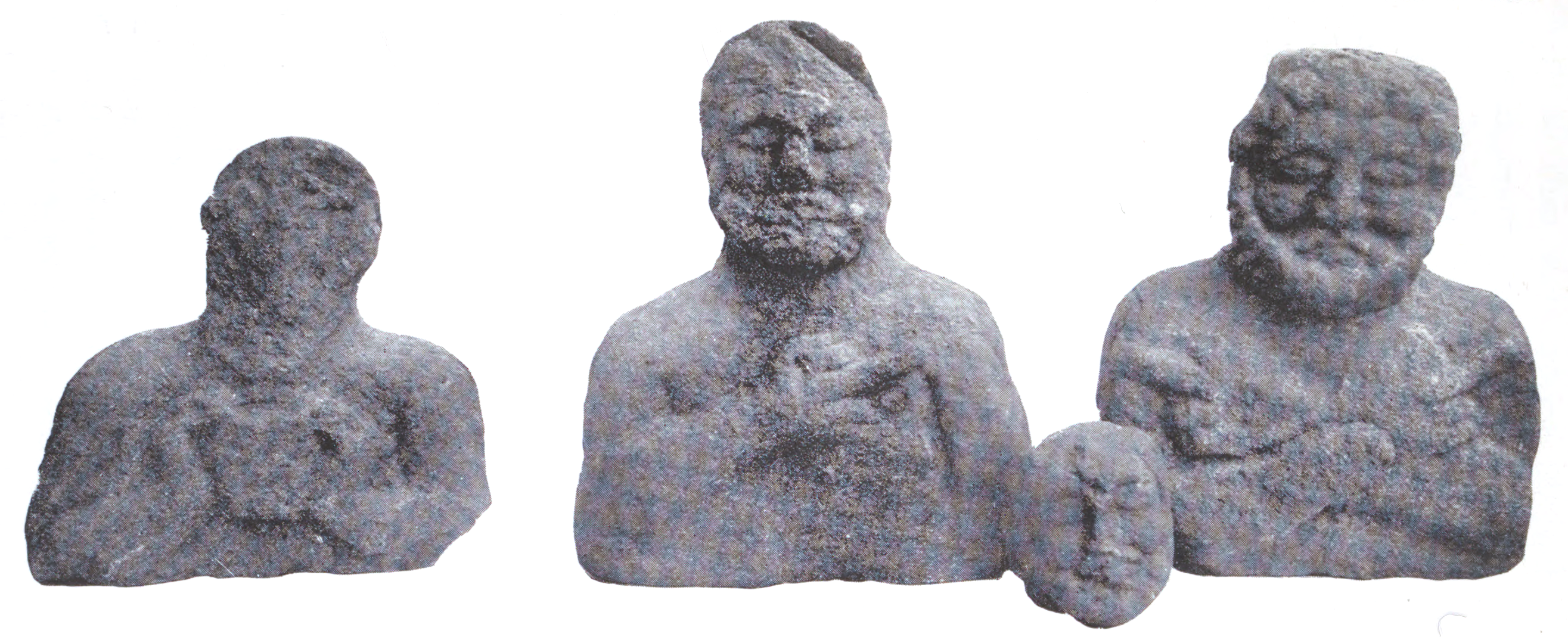
Roman images in stone from Bar Hill Fort. Silenus and bearded man with middle finger extended in the "infamis digitus" to ward off the evil eye. A video of the figure on the right has been made.
