= The Joke Machine =

- Genre: Children
- Starring: The Krankies
- Country of origin: United Kingdom
- Original language: English
- No. of series: 1
- No. of episodes: 50

Production
- Running time: 30 minutes

Original release
- Network: ITV
- Release: 26 December 1985 – 6 November 1986

The Joke Machine was the Krankies' first solo attempt at a children's television show since Crackerjack.
