= Queenzieburn =

Coordinates: 55.973°N 04.092°W

Queenzieburn: Scots: Queenieburn
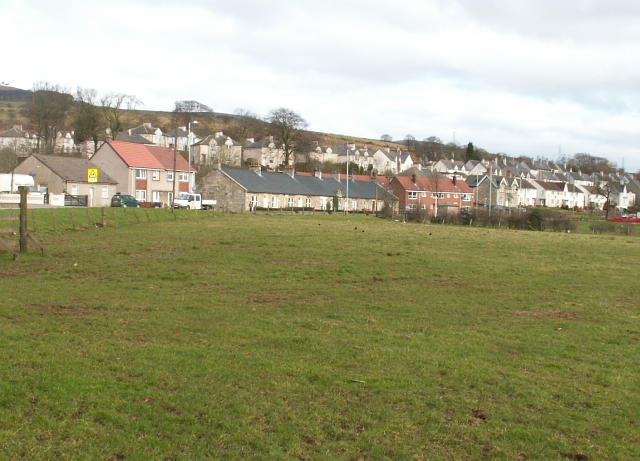
- Queenzieburn viewed from the west

- Location within North Lanarkshire
- Population: 520
- Council area: North Lanarkshire
- Lieutenancy area: Dunbartonshire
- Country: Scotland
- Sovereign state: United Kingdom
- Post town: Glasgow
- Postcode district: G65
- Police: Scotland
- Fire: Scottish
- Ambulance: Scottish
- UK Parliament: Cumbernauld, Kilsyth and Kirkintilloch East
- Scottish Parliament: Cumbernauld and Kilsyth

Queenzieburn (Scots: Queenieburn) is a small settlement in the historic county of Stirlingshire and the Council Area of North Lanarkshire, Scotland. Its estimated population is 520. It is located near the town of Kilsyth and has a small industrial estate. The village has one school called Chapelgreen Primary. Senior pupils usually attend Kilsyth Academy.

== Etymology ==
Queenzieburn is pronounced /kwiːnibɜːrn/. This is due to the original Scots spelling, Queenȝieburn, containing the letter yogh, which was later erroneously confused with the tailed z. The meaning may be "stream, of the wedge place".

== Notable residents ==
Entertainer Janette Tough who, along with her husband Ian, make up the comedy duo the Krankies, grew up in Queenzieburn.

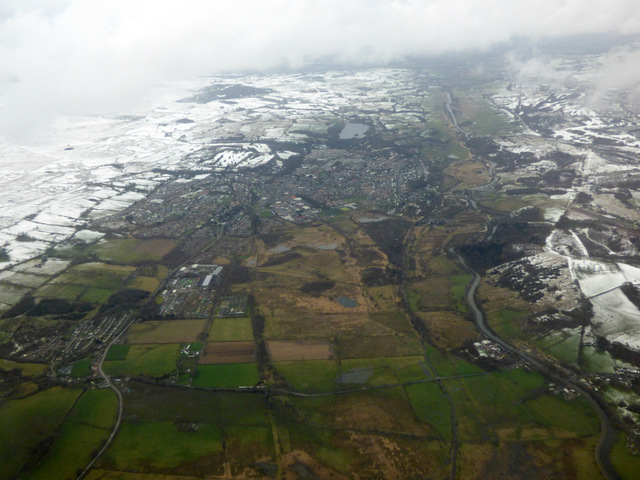
Queenzieburn and Kilsyth from the air. The four main vertical lines looking roughly left to right at the bottom of the picture are: Glasgow Road through Queenzieburn and Kilsyth, the line of the old Kelvin Valley Railway Line near Gavell Station, the River Kelvin, and the Forth and Clyde Canal
