= Colzium =

House and Estate in North Lanarkshire, Scotland

Coordinates: 55.98398°N 4.03895°W

Designations

Inventory of Gardens and Designed Landscapes in Scotland
- Official name: Colzium Lennox Estate
- Designated: 17 February 2021
- Reference no.: GDL00410

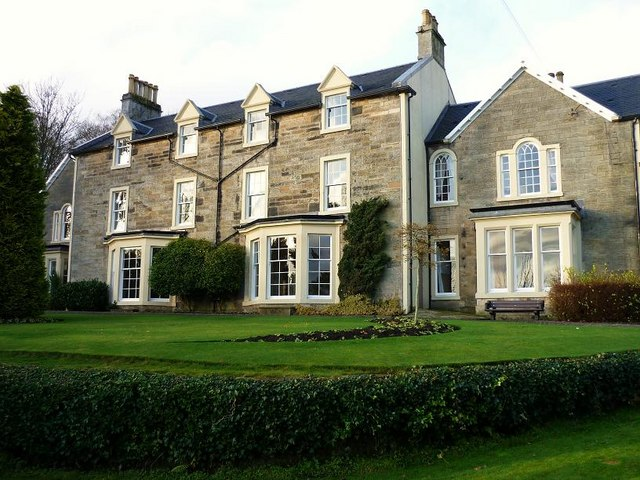
Colzium House

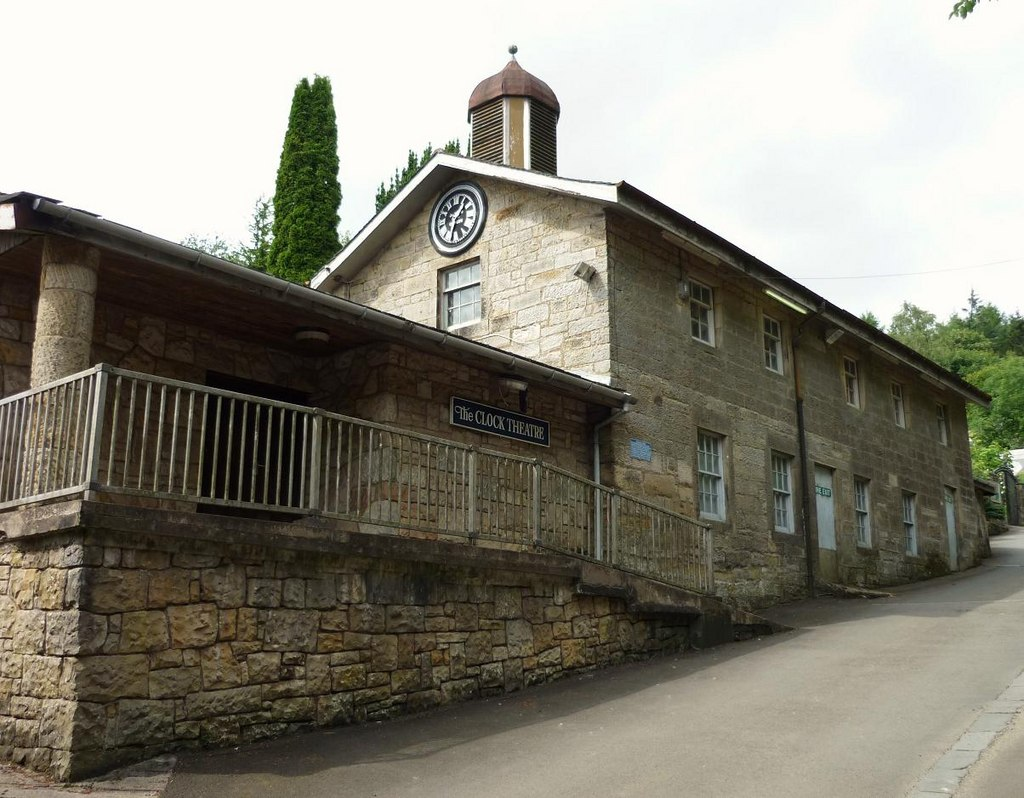
The Clock Theatre

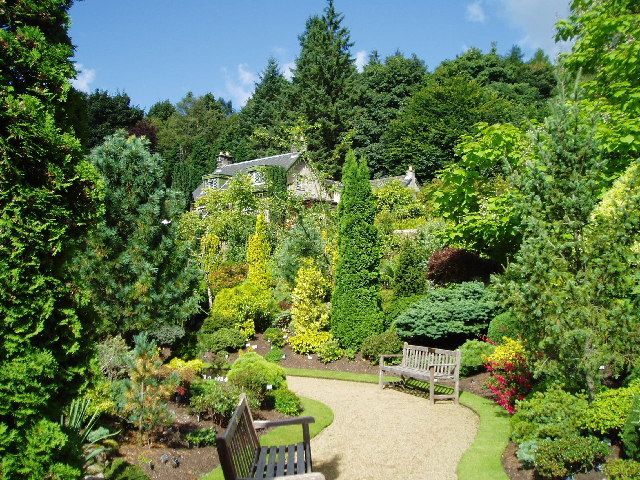
Colzium Estate Walled Garden

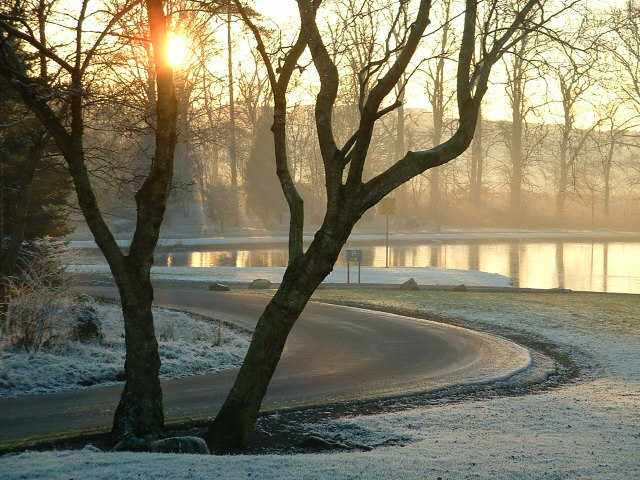
Purpose-built curling pond at Colzium, Kilsyth

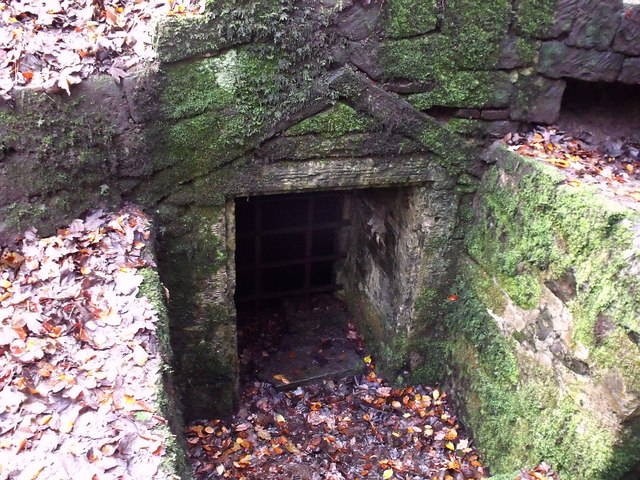
The Ice House at Colzium

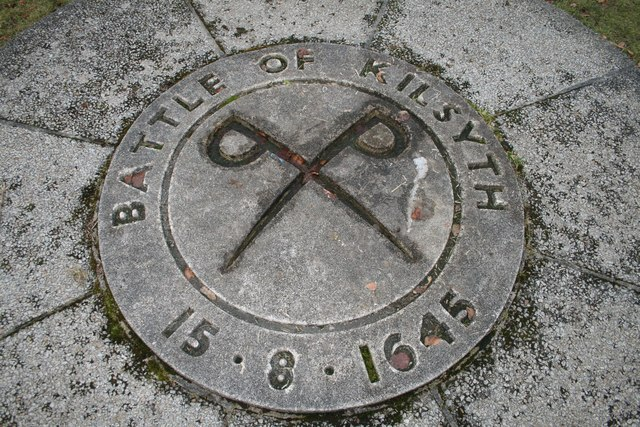
Detail of the Battle of Kilsyth monument at Colzium House Estate

Colzium House and Estate (pronounced Coal-Zee-Um) is about 500 metres to the north-east of Kilsyth, North Lanarkshire, Scotland. The present house dates from 1783 and was extended and modernised in 1861. The name may mean "defile leap".

W Mackay Lennox bought Colzium House and its policies in 1930 and in 1937, on his retiral as Town Clerk, he presented them to Kilsyth Burgh, in memory of his mother. The house and estate are principally used for public recreation, as the venue for the annual Kilsyth International Carnival in mid August, an "Italian Picnic" – a gathering of Italian/Scottish families, and functions such as weddings and parties. There is also a fine walled garden and a small theatre, the "clock theatre". A children's adventure playground has been opened.

The estate still contains the ruins of Colzium Castle just 100 metres north of Colzium House at the point where the driveway turns sharp left to Tak-Ma-Doon Road. The first building here was a large L-plan castle built by the Livingstons of Callendar in the mid-15th century to replace the ancient motte. A substantial hall block was added in 1575.

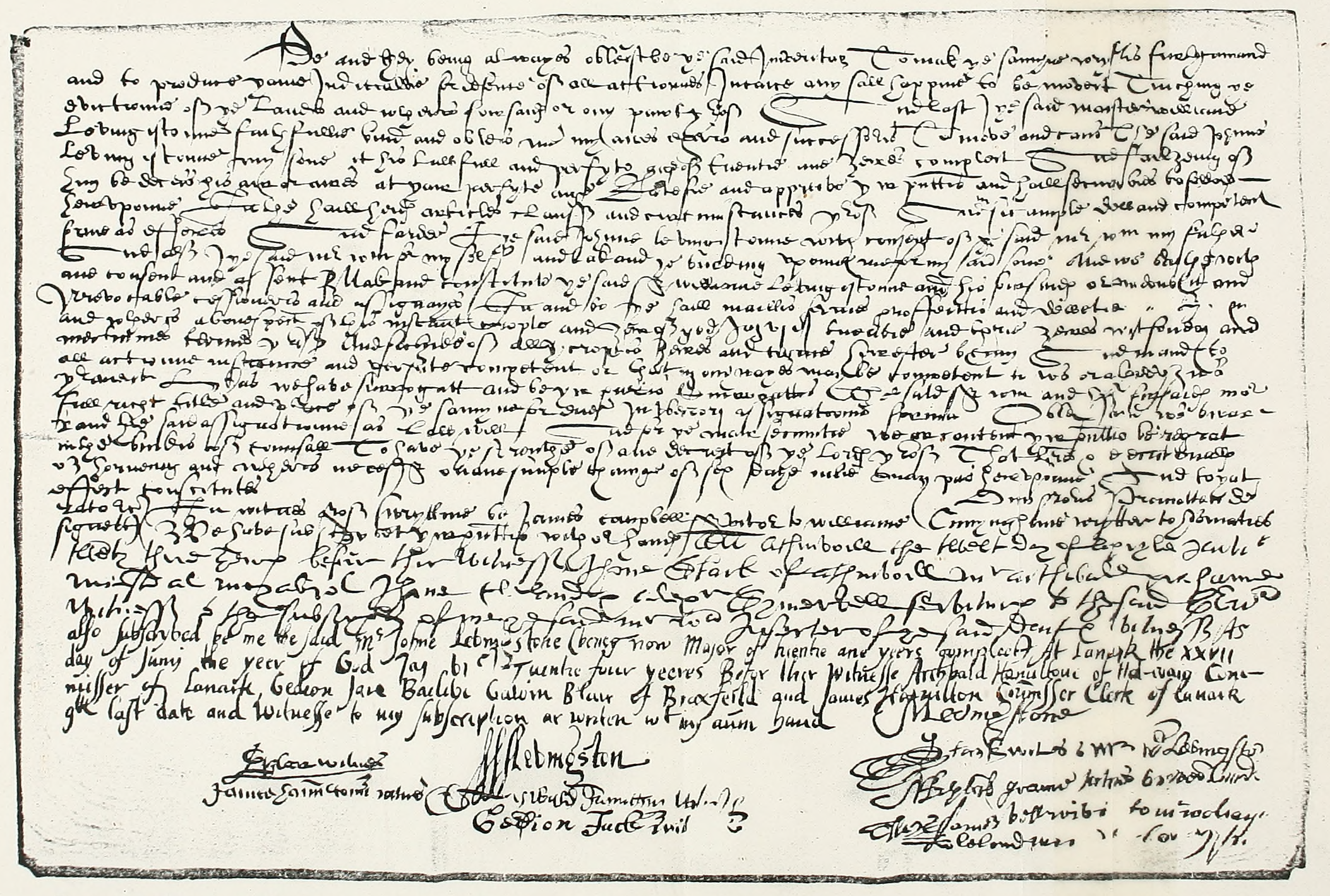
John Livingstone's sale of land. The last four lines are handwritten in his own hand.

The castle was demolished by the 3rd Viscount of Kilsyth in 1703, immediately prior to his accession to the title. The family lost the estate due to their Jacobite sympathies, and it then became the property of the Edmonstone family from Duntreath.

There is an ice house c. 1680 in the glen of the Colzium Burn which was excavated in 1977 and may still be viewed. The estate also contains the oldest curling ponds in the world. Kilsyth Curling Club, the world's first recorded curling club, was founded in Kilsyth in 1716.

The Battle of Kilsyth (1645) in the Wars of the Three Kingdoms was fought just a kilometre to the east. A ring, supposed to be the one lost by Lady Kilsyth, was reported to be kept at the house.
