= Kilsyth =

Town in Scotland

Coordinates: 55.98°N 4.06°W

Kilsyth: Scottish Gaelic: Cill Saidhe
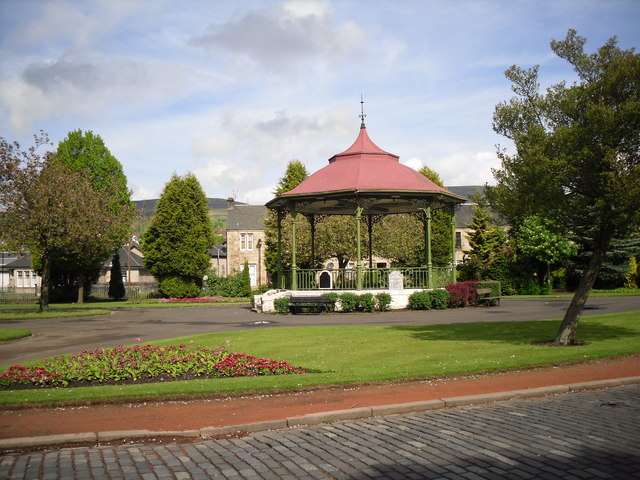
- The bandstand in Burngreen, Kilsyth

- Location within North Lanarkshire
- Population: 10,380 (2020)
- Council area: North Lanarkshire
- Lieutenancy area: Dunbartonshire
- Country: Scotland
- Sovereign state: United Kingdom
- Post town: GLASGOW
- Postcode district: G65
- Dialling code: 01236
- Police: Scotland
- Fire: Scottish
- Ambulance: Scottish
- UK Parliament: Cumbernauld and Kirkintilloch
- Scottish Parliament: Cumbernauld and Kilsyth

Kilsyth (/kɪlˈsaɪθ/; Scottish Gaelic: Cill Saidhe) is a town and civil parish in North Lanarkshire, roughly halfway between Glasgow and Stirling in Scotland. The estimated population is 10,380. The town is famous for the Battle of Kilsyth and the religious revivals of the 18th, 19th, and 20th centuries. The town now has links with Cumbernauld at one time being part of Cumbernauld and Kilsyth District Council. The towns also have the same members of parliament at Holyrood and Westminster.

== Location ==
Historically part of Stirlingshire, Kilsyth is at an elevation of 200 feet (60 metres) above sea level and occupies a narrow strip of land between the Kilsyth Hills to the north and the River Kelvin to the south. To the east and west it is bordered by marshland and bogs. The centre of the town is close to the confluence of the Garrell and Ebroch burns.

From earliest recorded times Kilsyth was one of the main routes between Glasgow, Falkirk and Edinburgh, and is very close to the Roman Antonine Wall, the Forth and Clyde Canal and the main Glasgow to Edinburgh railway line, with the nearest railway station at Croy. Formerly two separate stations existed in the town on separate, although linked, railway lines. One, the Kelvin Valley Railway went to Glasgow-Maryhill while the other, the Kilsyth and Bonnybridge railway, went via Banknock to Falkirk. The town occupies a sheltered position in the Kelvin Valley, and is bisected by the A803 between Kirkintilloch and Falkirk. The old drovers' road from Stirling, (the Tak Ma Doon Road), and the route south to Cumbernauld via Auchinstarry Bridge, intersect the A803 at Kilsyth.

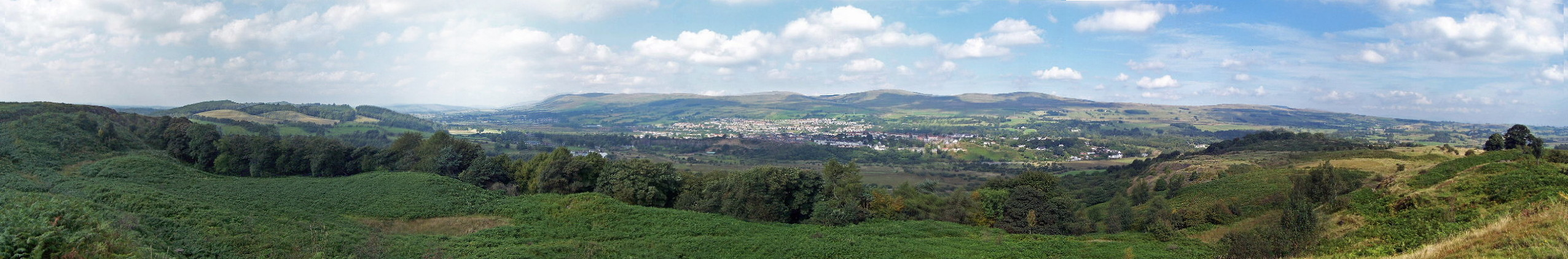
Panorama from Croy Hill and the Antonine Wall, looking over Kilsyth towards the Kilsyth Hills.

== History and development ==
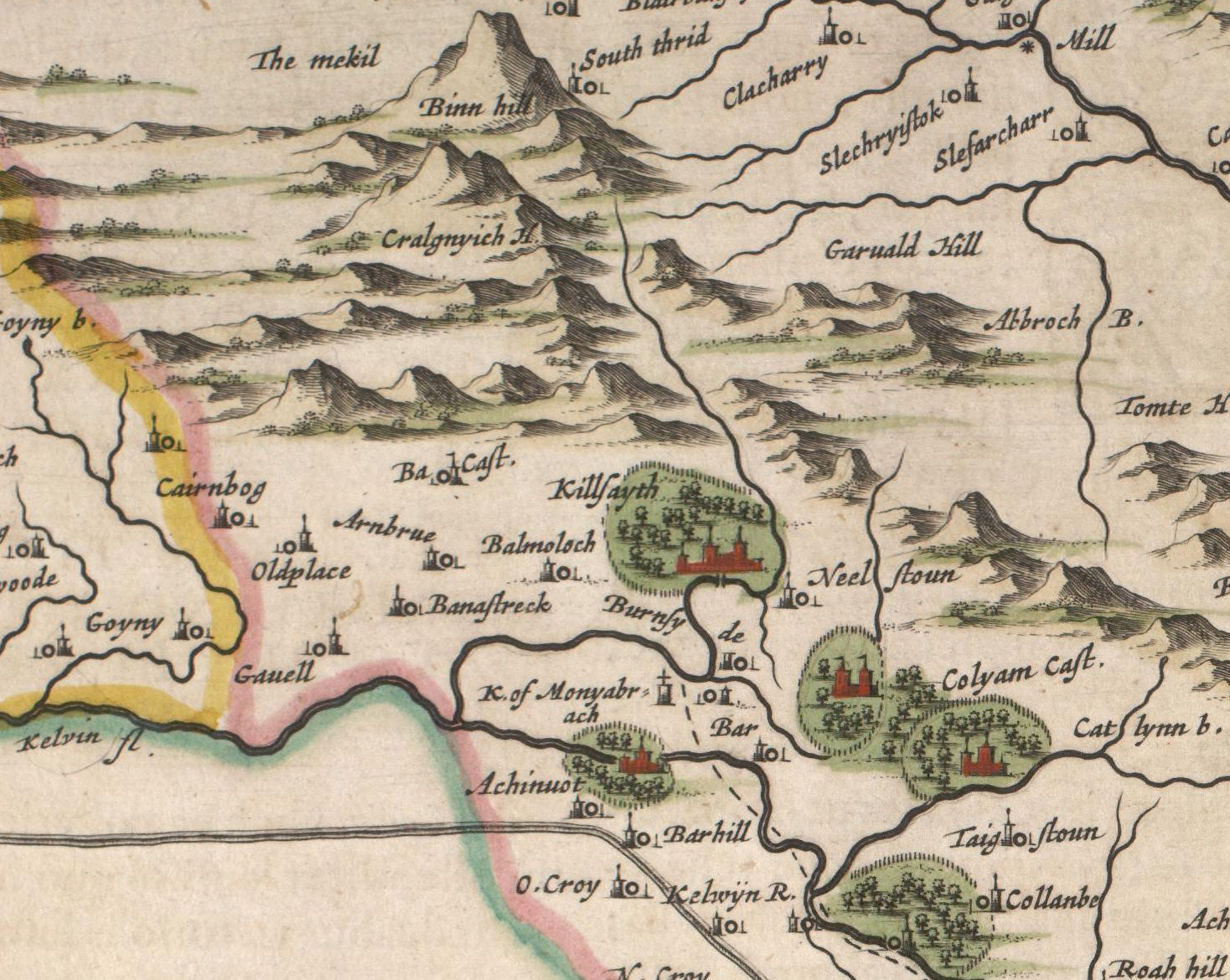
Section of Blaeu's map based on Pont's map showing the land around "Killsayth"

There is archaeological evidence of settlement since Neolithic times The Romans recognised the strategic significance of Kilsyth; the Antonine Wall forts of Bar Hill and Croy Hill are clearly visible from the present-day town. In the Middle Ages, Kilsyth held a key strategic position on one of the main routes across the narrowest part of Scotland. It was the site of two, now ruined, castles at Balcastle and Colzium. These were shown in Timothy Pont's map of 1580 and can also been seen on Blaeu's map which was derived from it. The town officially came into being in 1620 although a barony of Kilsyth preceded this. Regarding the name of the town, modern research into Kilsyth's toponymy leads to different findings than earlier analysis.

The civil war Battle of Kilsyth took place on hillsides between Kilsyth and Banton in 1645. Kilsyth was later closely associated with the various attempts by the Jacobites to regain the crown. Bonnie Prince Charlie is reported to have spent the night in the town in January 1746. The battlefield is now under Banton Loch which is a largely artificial body of water used to feed the Forth and Clyde Canal, close to its highest elevation. The canal was cut through Dullatur Bog in 1769–1770 bringing economic benefit to Kilsyth. (It apparently disturbed many small toads which relocated by hopping northwards).

The area was in the ownership of the Livingstone family at the time of the Battle of Kilsyth. As a reward for his support, Sir James Livingstone was made Viscount of Kilsyth by King Charles II in 1661. By 1715, the Livingstones were supporting the Jacobite rebels, and had their estates confiscated. Later landowners were the Edmonstone family, who built Colzium House in 1783 and rebuilt it in 1861. It is now a museum in a public park.

In 1826, Kilsyth was given burgh status, enabling it to have burgesses and a market.

Historically the parish was known as Moniabrugh, or one of its variants, with its name changing sometime in the 18th century. The town economy has shifted over the past three centuries from dairy farming, handloom weaving, tambouring and extractive industries to light engineering, transport and service industries. Many of the townsfolk of working age now commute to work in larger towns or Glasgow.

== Religion and revivals ==
Following its foundation as an early monastic settlement, the town has a long tradition of radical protestantism. John Livingstone described himself as being from Monyabrock, an old name for Kilsyth. The town was the scene of major revivals for example under the leadership of James Robe in 1742. William Hamilton Burns a minister in Kilsyth, and his son William Chalmers Burns a missionary to China also saw revival in 1839, part of the Second Great Awakening. William Irvine (evangelist and founder of the Two by Twos and Cooneyites sects) was born in Kilsyth in 1863.

The Church of Scotland parish church was founded in 1768 and the present building was opened in 1893. Its first ministers were father and son, John Anderson (d.1862) and Robert Anderson (d.1907): in 1900, the church was named the Anderson church in their honour.

The formation of the new Church of God, the first Pentecostal Church in Scotland in 1902 led to further outbreaks of revival in 1908 and to Kilsyth becoming an early focus of Pentecostalism.

== Administration ==
Kilsyth was originally part of the deanery of Lennox. The parish was called variously Monyabroch, Monaeburgh, or Moniabrocd, but part of the parish was called Kelvesyth by the beginnings of the 13th century. The lands passed through the hands of branches of the Callendar and Livingston families as their fortunes waxed and waned, eventually becoming the property of the Edmonstones. Kilsyth was established as a Burgh of Barony in 1620. A Town Charter was granted in 1826, permitting the holders of plots to elect a Town Council. It used to be part of Stirlingshire, but is now within North Lanarkshire jurisdiction.

In 2012, the multi-member ward was represented by three elected councillors; Jean Jones (Labour), Heather McVey (Labour) and Alan Stevenson (SNP). Jamie Hepburn MSP was elected as Cumbernauld and Kilsyth (Scottish Parliament constituency) member of the Scottish Parliament on 5 May 2011 with a majority of 3459. Since May 2015, Stuart MacDonald has been Westminster MP for the Cumbernauld, Kilsyth and Kirkintilloch East (UK Parliament constituency). He is a member of the Scottish National Party. As he said in his maiden speech he has sometimes been mistaken for his namesake who is also an SNP MP.

Kilsyth Community Council, as the locally elected representative body, is an active community group but enjoys very limited powers.

Since 1995 Kilsyth has been part of North Lanarkshire. The arms of Cumbernauld and Kilsyth District Council featured an open Bible and the shuttle and miner's lamp. These symbols were taken from the earlier arms of Kilsyth. However the open Bible and the miner's lamp were the only symbols which were carried on to the North Lanarkshire coat of arms.

== Attractions and events ==
Kilsyth has a prominent pedestrianized Main Street with commercial properties, parks and gardens at Burngreen and Colzium, hostelries such as the Coachman Hotel, the Boathouse and the Scarecrow pub, and a number of local restaurants including European, Indian, Chinese, and fish & chips. The nearby villages of Croy, Banton, Queenzieburn, and Twechar are within easy walking distance from Kilsyth.

Townhead reservoir, known locally as Banton Loch, is the site of the Battle of Kilsyth and is the main reservoir for the Forth and Clyde Canal. A thriving marina has been developed at Auchinstarry close to the climbing wall and lakes at the old quarry.

Kilsyth Lennox Golf Club was founded in 1899. The original nine-hole course was the Balmalloch area of the town, but moved in 1905 to the present position North East of the town. Between 1997 and 2002, the majority of the greens and tees were redesigned by Rocky Roquemore, the American Golf Course architect. The club hosts a Festival of Golf in the first week in July.

Kilsyth has a public swimming pool, open seven days a week, a public library, a small cottage hospital and health centre, and a range of recreational facilities such as tennis courts and bowling clubs. A feature of Burngreen Park is a children's road safety attraction with a model road layout and bikes, etc. for hire. It is also an accredited Walkers are Welcome town.

Nearby attractions include the Falkirk Wheel, a huge boat lift that connects the Union and Forth & Clyde Canal networks, and the Antonine Wall – marking the northern edge of the Roman Empire. Kilsyth is about 30 minutes from Glasgow, 15 minutes from Falkirk, 30 minutes from Stirling and 45 minutes from Edinburgh by car, bus (new express link in 2011) or train from nearby Croy station.

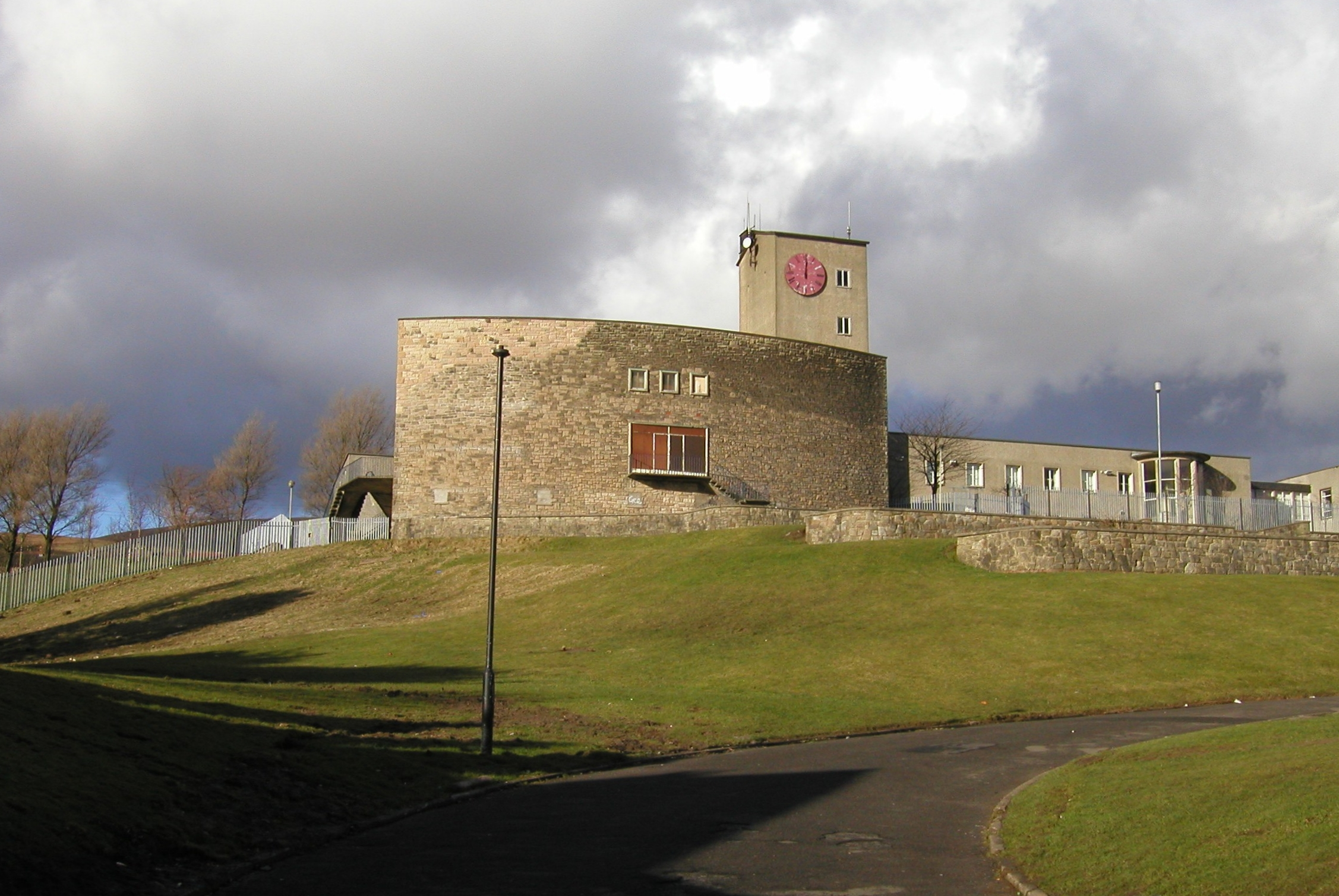
Kilsyth Academy

Kilsyth held an international carnival in mid-August – in 2007 this was held on Sunday August 12 and headlined the Peatbog Faeries and David Sneddon. It is held in the grounds of the wooded Colzium estate nearby. Following a two-year break, the carnival was relaunched in mid-August 2010 as a multi-day music, comedy and dance festival under the banner of the BIG KIC headlining Salsa Celtica, Dougie MacLean and Fred MacAulay. However this event is no longer held

Civic Week festivities are held in June each year, with the traditional crowning of the Civic Queen. The festival features a variety of cultural and sports activities usually featuring members of clubs/groups from the town. A Christmas Festival is held annually, supported by the Rotary Club of Kilsyth.

The town is well represented on the football front, being the home of Kilsyth Rangers F.C. who are the local junior team, and there are two amateur teams - Kilsyth United AFC & Kilsyth Amateurs. There is also the Golden Gloves Boxing Club and many other groups and organisations. Kilsyth has three primary schools: Kilsyth Primary and Balmalloch Primary, and St Patrick's Primary School (Roman Catholic). Children from each school can progress to Kilsyth Academy while children from St Patrick's Primary generally advance to St. Maurice's High School located in nearby Cumbernauld. Kilsyth Academy is situated on Corrie Road and hosts a range of functions throughout the year.

== Notable residents ==
- Prof James Jeffray (1759–1849) anatomist
- William Irvine (Scottish evangelist)

== Twin town ==
Kilsyth is twinned with Meulan in France. Kilsyth artworks include several pieces by William Piper, including one about Kilsyth and Meulan.

== Sources ==
- Incorporates material from Kilsyth_Scotland, Banton Primary and ケルビンバレーパーク 最安値・口コミ・おススメ商品・サービス made available under the GFDL.

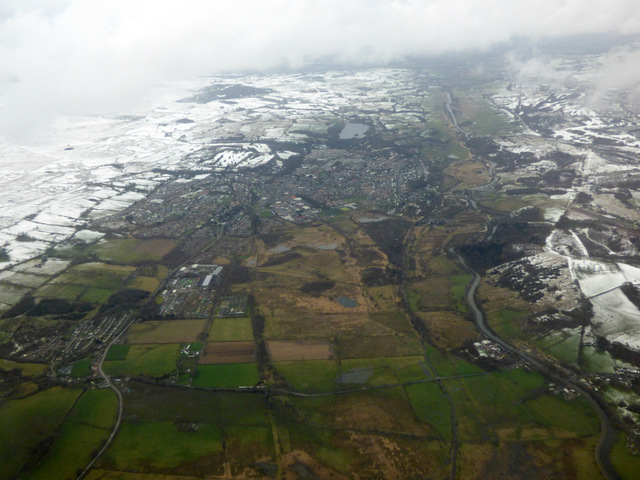
Queenzieburn and Kilsyth from the air. The four main vertical lines looking roughly eastwards at the bottom of the picture are: Glasgow Road through Queenzieburn and Kilsyth, the line of the old Kelvin Valley Railway Line near Gavell Station, the River Kelvin, and the Forth and Clyde Canal

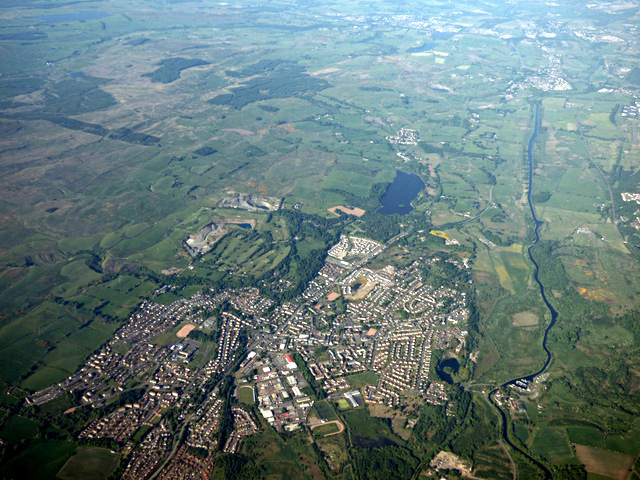
Kilsyth from the air from 2016
