= Kilsyth and Bonnybridge Railway =

Former railway line in Scotland

Coordinates: 55.9852°N 4.0002°W

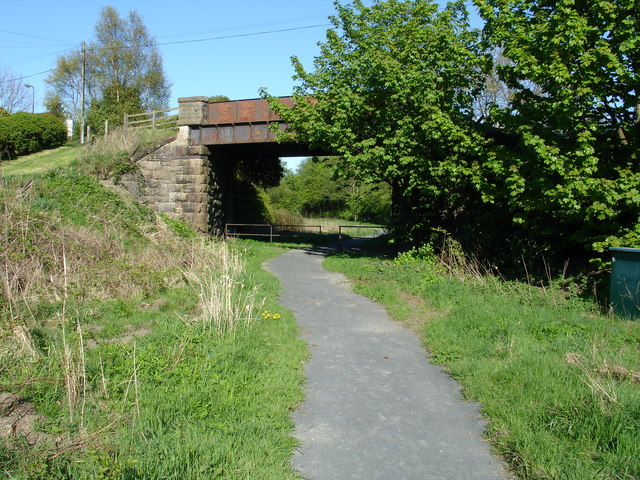
- The site of Banknock Railway Station

Overview
- Locale: Scotland

History
- Opened: 1888
- Closed: 1964

Technical
- Line length: 8 1/2 miles (13.7 km)
- Track gauge: 4 ft 8 1/2 in (1,435 mm)

The Kilsyth and Bonnybridge Railway was a railway line in central Scotland, built to exploit the mineral extractive industries in the area; it opened in 1888. A passenger service was run, but bus competition overwhelmed it after 1920 and the passenger service closed in 1935. The goods and mineral traffic continued, but it was dependent on the industries it served, and when they declined so did the business on the railway; it closed in 1964 and none of it is now in railway use.

== History ==
=== Before the Kilsyth and Bonnybridge Railway ===
Kilsyth and Bonnybridge had both become important industrial centres during the nineteenth century; the proximity of the Forth and Clyde Canal as a transport medium facilitated the development of industry, and coal mining and iron smelting had become particularly dominant. The Baird Brothers of Gartsherrie were especially prominent in Kilsyth, and they built a considerable network of mineral tramways serving their pits and ironworks.

Although the Edinburgh and Glasgow Railway had opened in 1842, its route lay some distance to the south, and across the Forth and Clyde Canal. (Note: The E&GR main line had a "Bonnybridge" station, but this was some considerable distance from the town.) The first town in the district reached by a railway was Denny, served from the east in 1858: the Scottish Central Railway opened its branch to the town, from Larbert Junction.

In 1878 the nominally independent Kelvin Valley Railway was opened, running from Kilsyth to a junction with the Campsie Branch of the North British Railway, successor to the Edinburgh and Glasgow Railway, and giving access for passengers and minerals to Glasgow over that company's lines. The following year a second section of the Kelvin Valley line was opened, running to Maryhill on the north-west margin of Glasgow, and giving access there over the Stobcross branch of the North British Railway to the new dock at Stobcross, soon to be named the Queen's Dock.

=== Authorisation ===
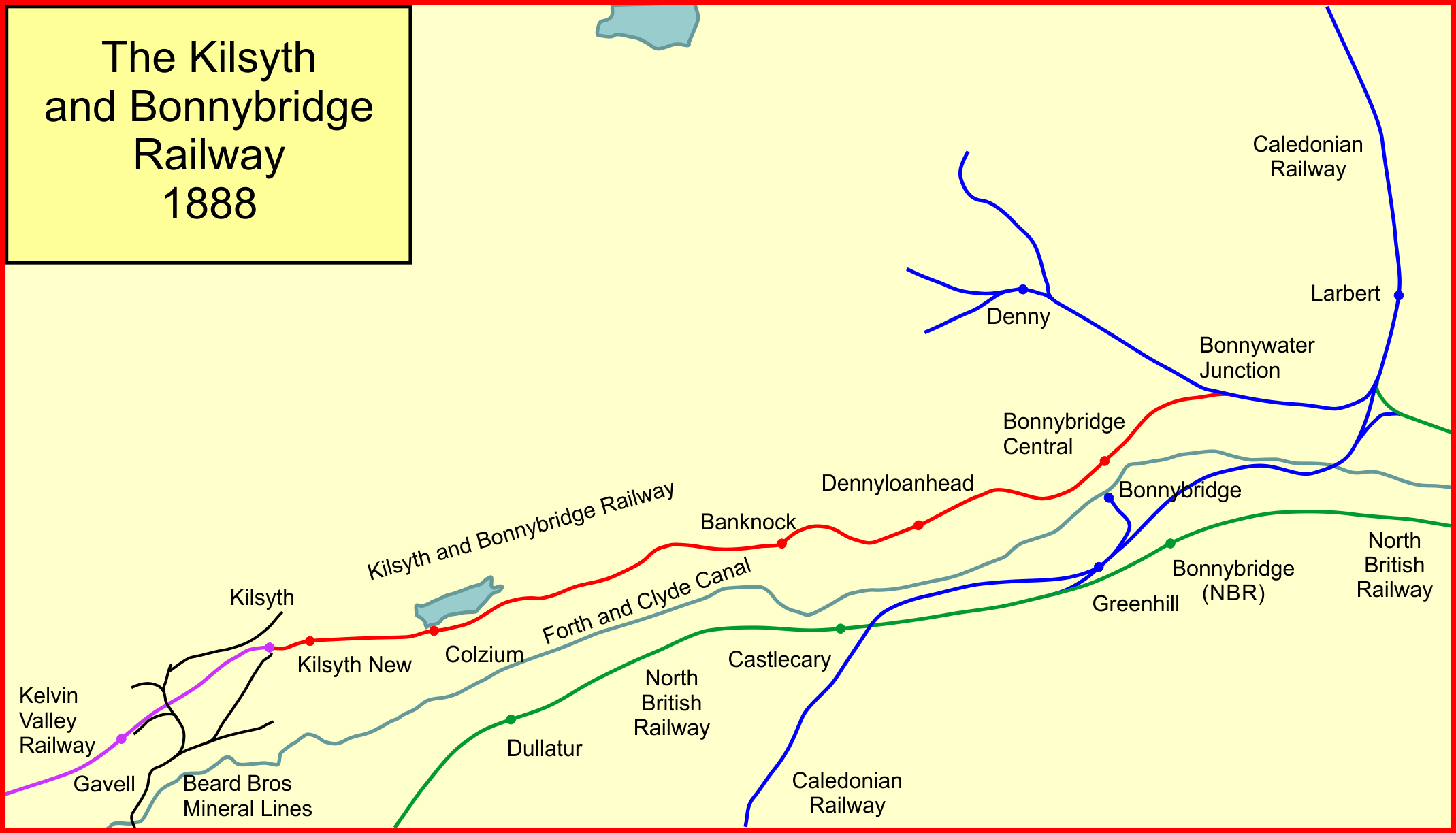
System map of the Kilsyth and Bonnybridge Railway

The industrial potential of the tract of land between Kilsyth and Denny was attractive for exploitation. At this period there was intense rivalry between the North British Railway and the Caledonian Railway, and any proposed construction into the competitor's territory might result in hostile and costly reprisals. At length an independent concern was promoted to build a line closing the gap.

Kilsyth and Bonnybridge Railway Act 1882
- Act of Parliament
- Parliament of the United Kingdom
- Long title: An Act for making a Railway from the Kelvin Valley Railway to the Denny Branch of the Caledonian Railway and for other purposes.
- Citation: 45 & 46 Vict. c. clxxxvi

Dates
- Royal assent: 10 August 1882

Text of statute as originally enacted

The Kilsyth and Bonnybridge Railway was authorised by the Kilsyth and Bonnybridge Railway Act 1882 (45 & 46 Vict. c. clxxxvi) on 10 August 1882, with capital of £130,000. The line was to run from the Kelvin Valley Railway at Kilsyth to Bonnywater Junction on the Caledonian's Denny branch.

Evidently the proprietors had second thoughts, for in 1885 they decided to abandon the project. However they again changed their mind and continued with the construction.

Kilsyth and Bonnybridge Railway Act 1887
- Act of Parliament
- Parliament of the United Kingdom
- Long title: An Act to revive and extend the powers granted to the Kilsyth and Bonnybridge Railway Company for the compulsory purchase of certain lands and to extend the time for the completion of their authorised railways to enable the Company to raise further capital and for other purposes.
- Citation: 50 & 51 Vict. c. xcviii

Dates
- Royal assent: 12 July 1887

Text of statute as originally enacted

Although the terrain was relatively easy, the line was not constructed speedily, and in fact the Caledonian Railway built a short branch line to Bonnybridge in the meantime, opening in 1886. However the Caledonian's Bonnybridge terminus was on the south side of the Forth and Clyde Canal, limiting its usefulness. On 12 July 1887 the K&BR obtained the Kilsyth and Bonnybridge Railway Act 1887 (50 & 51 Vict. c. xcviii) authorising either the NBR or the Caledonian Railway to work the line.

=== Operation ===
The Kilsyth and Bonnybridge line opened on 2 July 1888. Immediately prior to the opening the company agreed with the NBR and the Caledonian to operate the railway as a "common line" with both those companies permitted to operate trains over it; the NBR had running powers to Larbert over the Caledonian Railway. Station staffing was at the expense of the K&BR itself. Infrastructure maintenance was carried out by each company in alternate years.

Following the opening of the line there were normally four passenger trains daily between Glasgow and Bonnybridge. The Caledonian operated onwards trains from Bonnybridge to Larbert. (Note: Ross says, in The Caledonian, page 130, that the Caledonian Railway connections were to Greenhill. This is a mistake; the Greenhill trains were from the Caledonian Railway Bonnybridge station, south of the Forth and Clyde Canal.) Some NBR trains ran throughout between Glasgow and Larbert via Bonnybridge. The Caledonian also owned the Forth and Clyde Canal at this time. The canal ran parallel to the railway, and the Caledonian went to considerable lengths to arrange mineral line connections to the canal, to facilitate its use by mining companies, providing stiff competition for the railway.

The company planned an ambitious scheme to construct a three-mile tunnel under the Forth to Dunfermline, but the first half-year profits of £297, enabling a dividend of 0.375%, illustrated how impossible such a scheme would be. In despair the directors prepared to abandon the line, (Note: According to Thomas; this may be confusion with the 1885 proposed abandonment of construction.) and obtained legal powers in an act of Parliament allowing it to do so, but business picked up a little and they did not proceed with the closure.

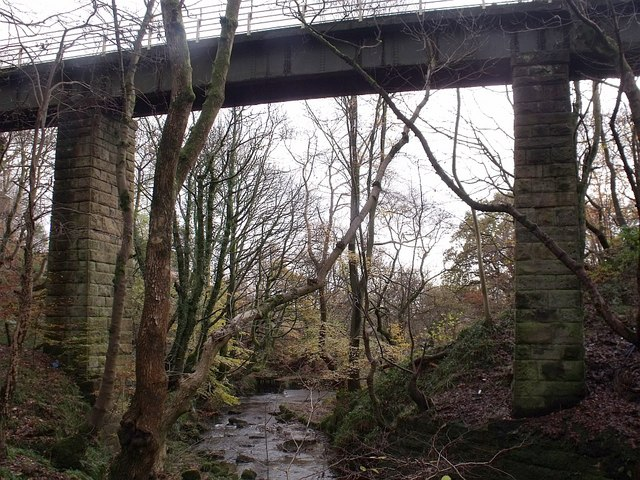
Bridge over the Garrel Glen now utilised as part of the north Kilsyth path network

In 1908 the independent staffing of the stations ceased and the railway was staffed by the NBR and the Caledonian, working together. Following the Railways Act 1921, the K&BR ended its independent existence and the line became jointly operated between the new London and North Eastern Railway (LNER), as successor to the North British Railway, and the London Midland and Scottish Railway (LMS) as successor to the Caledonian Railway.

Motor bus services and improved roads encouraged the development of efficient bus services in the 1920s and use of the passenger trains declined steeply. Passenger services were withdrawn on 1 July 1935. As the mines closed freight traffic also declined and the line was closed in stages. The last section to close was between Kilsyth and Banknock, on 4 May 1964.

== Topography ==
The line opened on 2 July 1888 and closed to passenger trains on 1 February 1935. Locations on the line were:

- Kilsyth; Kelvin Valley Railway station; may have been renamed Kilsyth Old after opening of K&BR line; closed 6 August 1951 (serving the Glasgow direction);
- Kilsyth New; may have been known as Kilsyth Junction;
- Colzium; closed 1 March 1917; Caledonian trains ceased on 1 February 1917;
- Banknock;
- Dennyloanhead;
- Bonnybridge Central; there was a Caledonian Railway terminus station named Bonnybridge, and a North British Railway station named Bonnybridge High on the former E&GR main line;
- Dennyloanhead Junction; converged with Caledonian Railway branch from Denny.
