= Inveravon =

Coordinates: 56°00′05″N 3°40′33″W

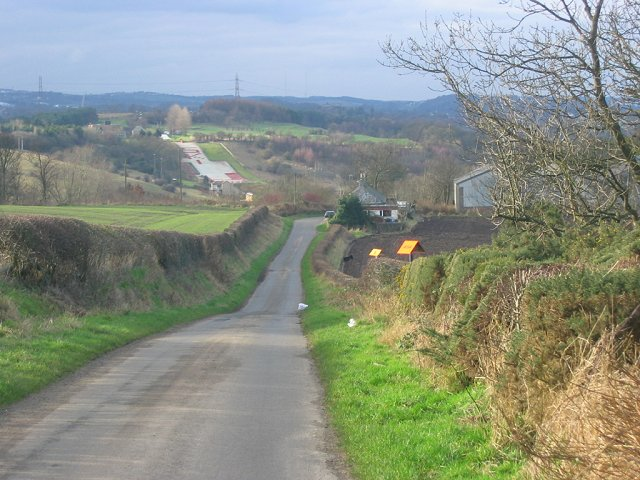
Inveravon - towards Polmont Ski Slope. The road follows the line of the Antonine Wall

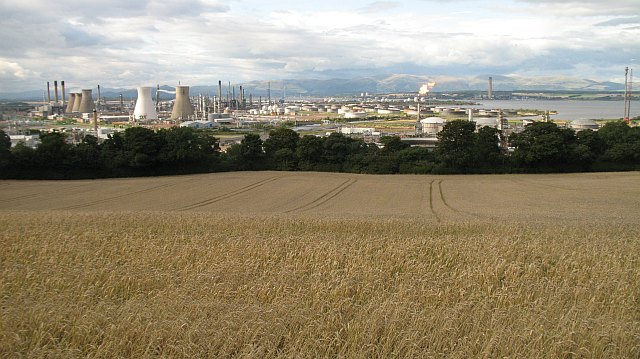
Wheat above Inveravon, with Grangemouth Oil Refinery

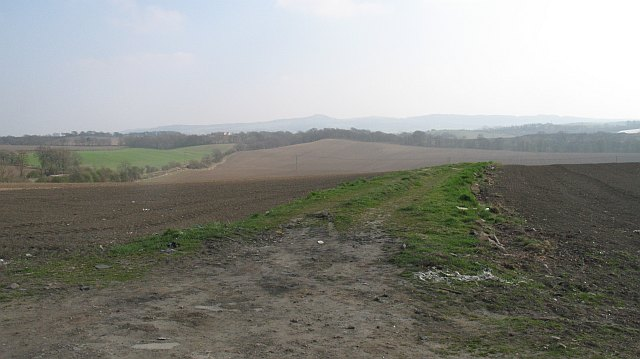
Farm track from the site of the Antonine Wall

Inveravon is sited on the east side of the River Avon in Scotland. It was long considered to be the likely site for a Roman Fort on the Antonine Wall in Scotland. The fort is one of the most dubious on the wall although some excavation and geophysics has been done. Near Inveravon Tower, the bare traces of a fort were found but there is nothing that an unskilled visitor could identify. Several excavations have unearthed the site's foundations as well as a section of the Military Way. Cobbled surfaces and some stone walls were found. Also ‘expansions’ were discovered, perhaps used as signal or beacon towers.

Two temporary marching camps have been found. In the 1950s aerial photography brought these to light. News about them was circulated in the Journal of Roman Studies by J.K. St. Joseph. The sites are south of the Wall and south-east of Inveravon. In 1960, aerial photography revealed a 3rd camp. It was also south of the Wall. Additional camps at Mumrills and on either side of Grangemouth Golf Course have been identified.

Many Roman forts along the wall held garrisons of around 500 men. Larger forts like Castlecary and Birrens had a nominal cohort of 1000 men but probably sheltered women and children as well although the troops were not allowed to marry. There is likely too to have been large communities of civilians around the site.

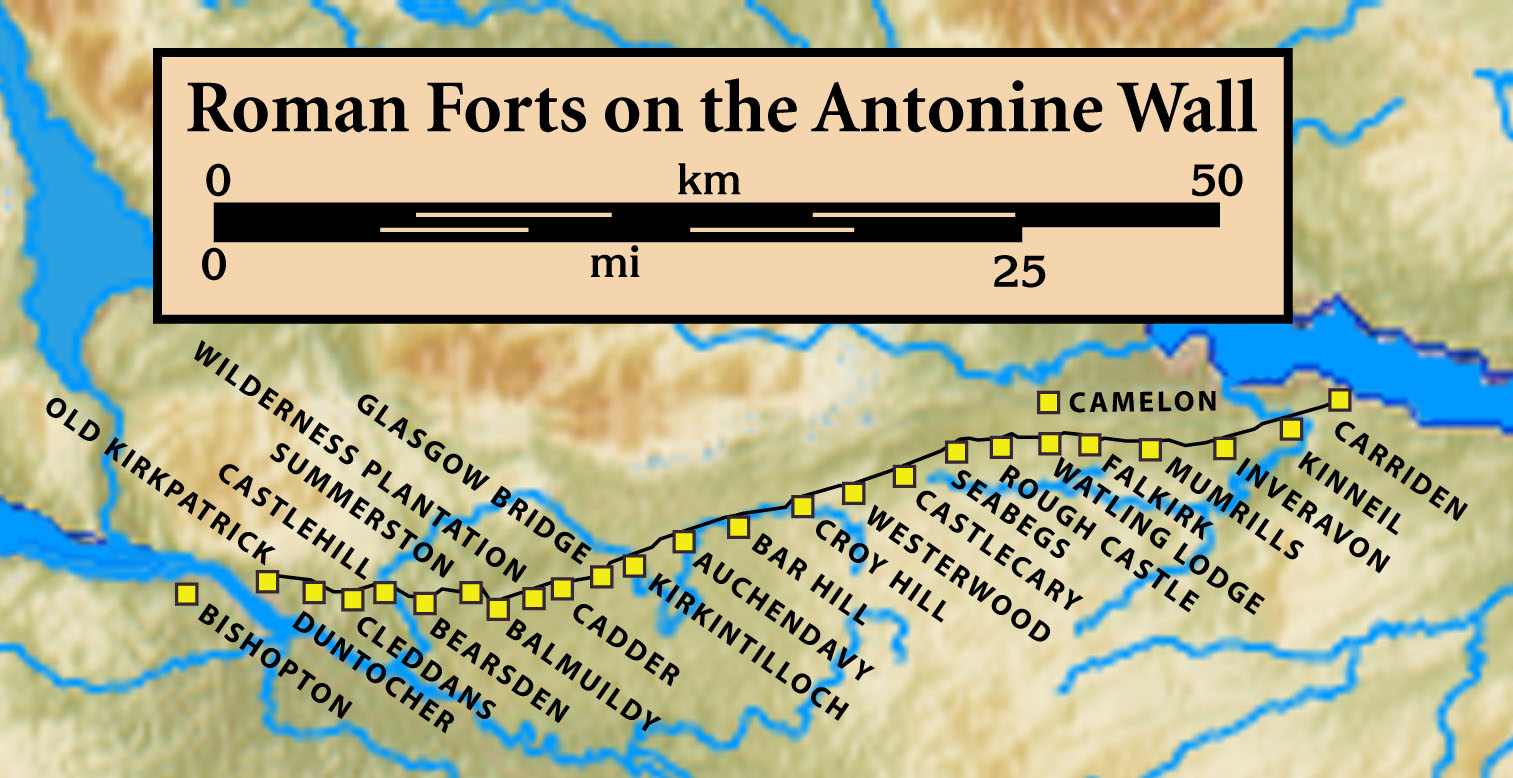
Forts and Fortlets associated with the Antonine Wall from west to east: Bishopton, Old Kilpatrick, Duntocher, Cleddans, Castlehill, Bearsden, Summerston, Balmuildy, Wilderness Plantation, Cadder, Glasgow Bridge, Kirkintilloch, Auchendavy, Bar Hill, Croy Hill, Westerwood, Castlecary, Seabegs, Rough Castle, Camelon, Watling Lodge, Falkirk, Mumrills, Inveravon, Kinneil, Carriden
