= Watling Lodge =

Roman fortlet on the Antonine Wall in Scotland

Coordinates: 55.9976°N 3.8253°W

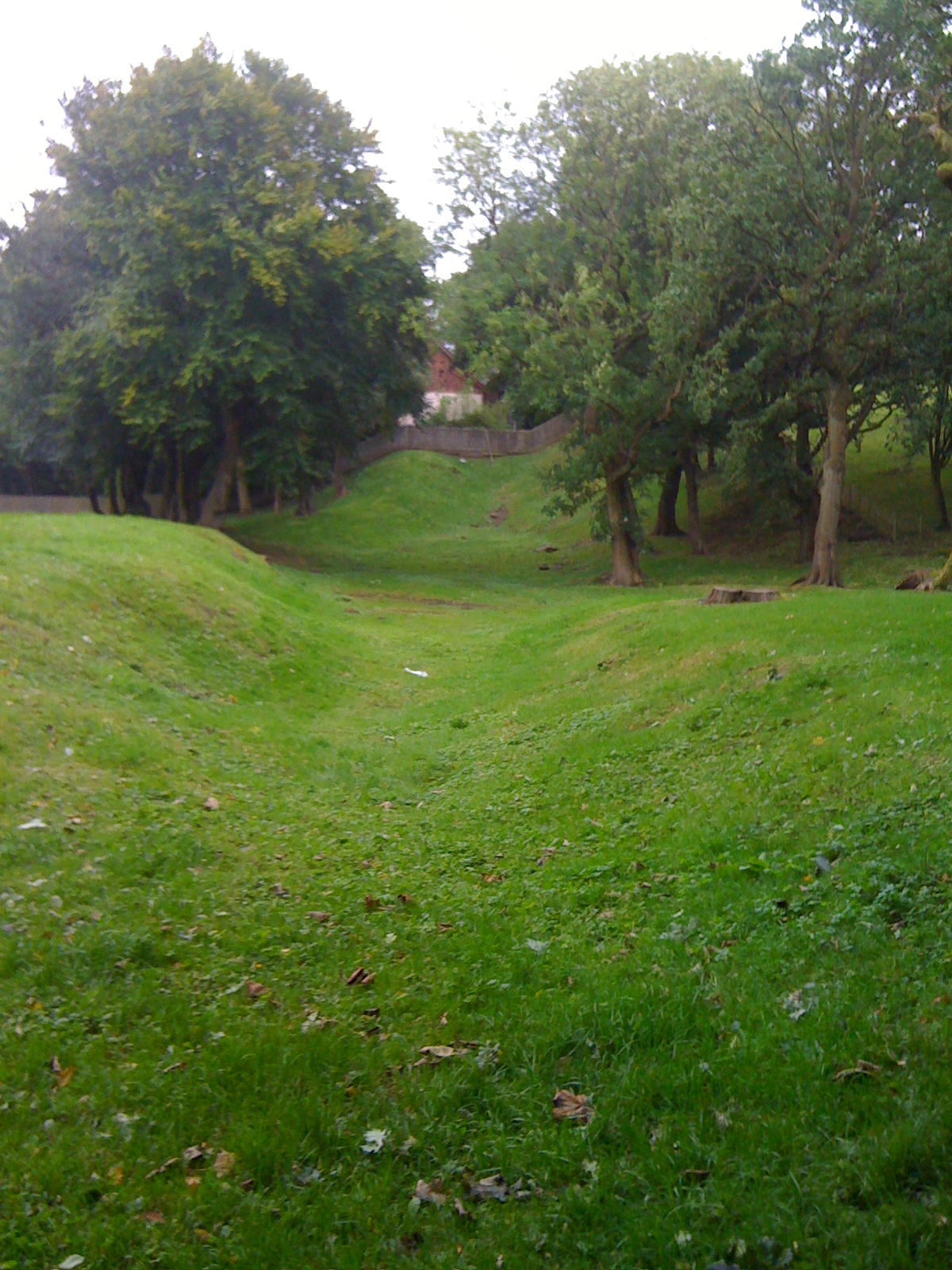

- Location within Scotland Central Belt
- Location: Near Tamfourhill, Falkirk, Scotland

History
- Founded: 142 AD
- Built: Antoninus Pius

Site notes
- Condition: Ruined

Watling Lodge was a Roman fortlet on the Antonine Wall in Scotland. It was located near what is now Lock Sixteen on the Forth and Clyde Canal in Falkirk with neighbouring forts at Rough Castle to the west and Falkirk to the east. There was also a fort at Camelon to the north. There was also a Roman temporary camp found a short distance south of the site.

== Description ==
Watling Lodge has been described as the best preserved stretch of ditch from the Antonine Wall still in existence today. It is situated along Tamfourhill Road, south-west of Falkirk. This stretch is excellently preserved. One of the best overviews of the site is the video of the Bridgeness Slab by Falkirk Council, presented by Geoff Bailey, Keeper of Archeology and Local History at Falkirk Museum, from about 4 minutes 30s.

In Falkirk, the site is signposted from the A9 and is accessed from the B816, Tamfourhill Road. There is an information panel fairly close to the top of the wall. The panel shows how the Wall may have looked, and suggests Watling Lodge's place in the grand design of the construction.

== Excavation and finds ==
Sir George Macdonald wrote about the site. A digital reconstruction of the fortlet has been created. A Minecraft model of the site has also been constructed.

Many Roman forts along the wall held garrisons of around 500 men. Larger forts like Castlecary and Birrens had a nominal cohort of 1000 men but probably sheltered women and children as well, although the troops were not allowed to marry. It is likely that large communities of civilians were located around the site.

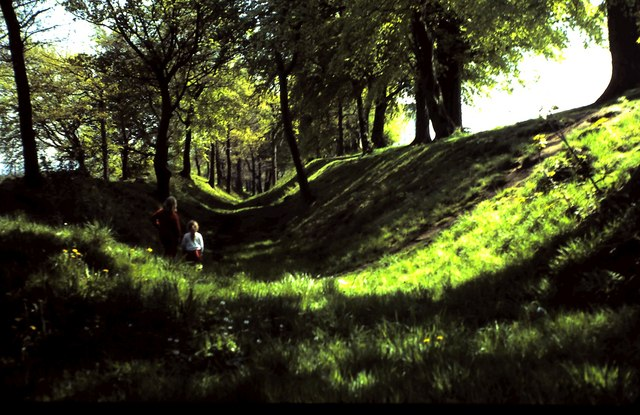
Antonine's Wall at Watling Lodge near Falkirk

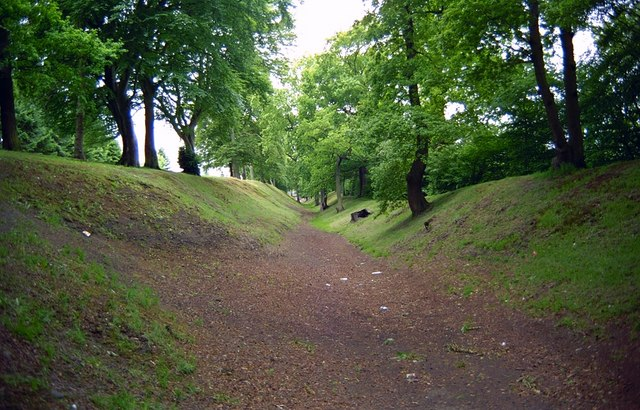
Ditch of the Antonine Wall at Watling Lodge

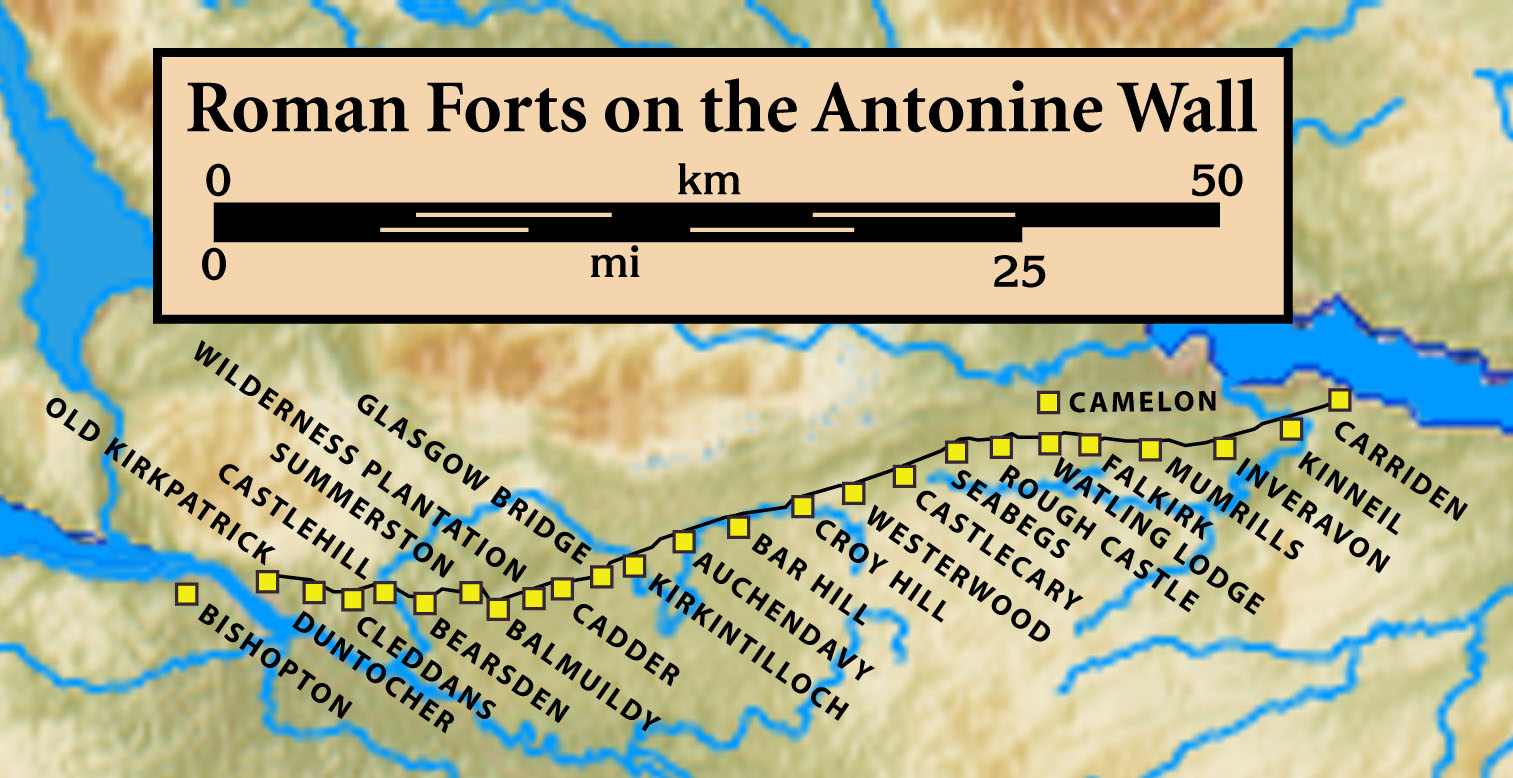
Forts and Fortlets associated with the Antonine Wall from west to east: Bishopton, Old Kilpatrick, Duntocher, Cleddans, Castlehill, Bearsden, Summerston, Balmuildy, Wilderness Plantation, Cadder, Glasgow Bridge, Kirkintilloch, Auchendavy, Bar Hill, Croy Hill, Westerwood, Castlecary, Seabegs, Rough Castle, Camelon, Watling Lodge, Falkirk, Mumrills, Inveravon, Kinneil, Carriden
