= Auchendavy =

Roman fort in East Dunbartonshire, Scotland

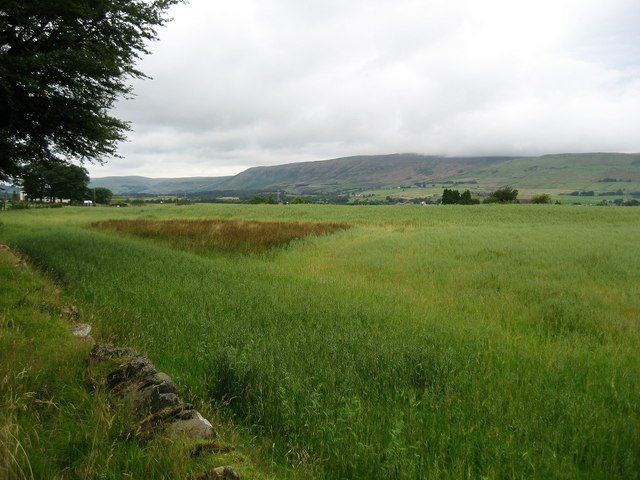
- View of the Campsie Fells from near Auchendavy Fort
- Interactive map of Auchendavy
- 55°56′57″N 4°07′10″W
- Location: East Dunbartonshire, United Kingdom

History
- Built: Antoninus Pius

Auchendavy was a Roman fort on the Antonine Wall in Scotland. Much of the site archeology was destroyed by the builders of the Forth and Clyde Canal. Between Bar Hill and Balmuildy the wall roughly follows the southern bank of the River Kelvin. The site of the fort is north of Kirkintilloch's northern border. It can be seen as a mound mid-way between the Forth and Clyde Canal and the road.

Sir George Macdonald wrote about the excavation of the site. He says, "Auchendavy is distinguished for the large number of antiquities found in and about it." "About it" includes Shirva Farm in Twechar where finds such as several tombstones were found.

== Context ==
Many Roman forts along the wall held garrisons of around 500 men. Larger forts like Castlecary and Birrens had a nominal cohort of 1000 men but probably sheltered women and children as well although the troops were not allowed to marry. There is likely too to have been large communities of civilians around the site.

== Altars ==
A centurion called Marcus Cocceius Firmus dedicated as many as five altars found at Auchendavy. He was a soldier with the Second Augusta Legion. A sandstone altar to Jupiter and Victory was found in a pit to the south-west of the Roman fort at Auchendavy. There is also an altar to Silvanus. Similarly, a sandstone altar, dedicated to the Presiding Spirit of the Land of Britain, was found near Auchendavy fort. Again a sandstone altar to Diana and Apollo, was found near Auchendavy fort. Yet another altar to Mars was also discovered. It also has dedications to: Minerva, parade-ground goddesses, Hercules, Epona and Victory.

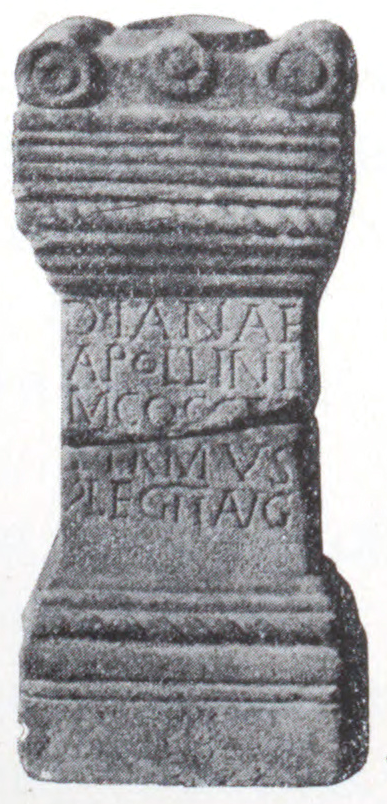
RIB 2174. Altar dedicated to Diana and Apollo. It has been scanned and a video produced.

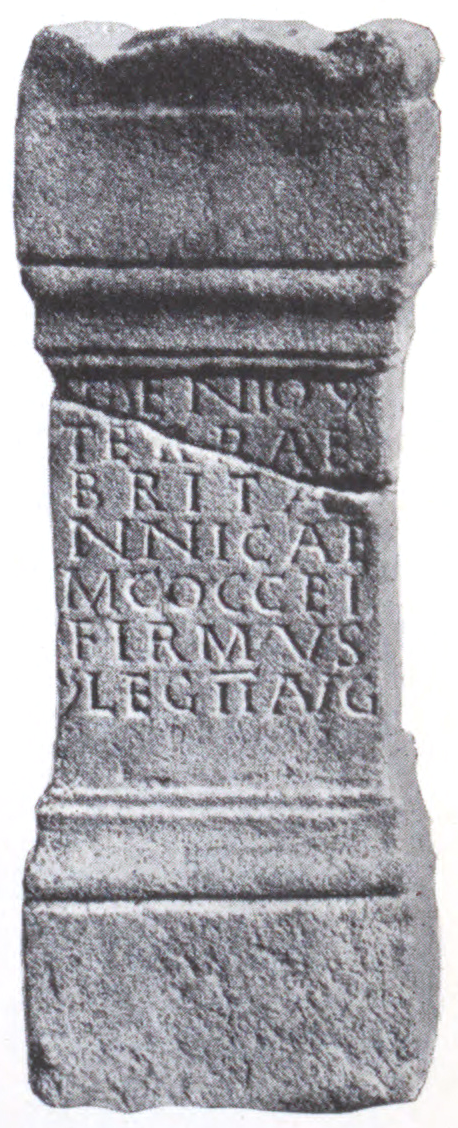
RIB 2175. Altar dedicated to the Genius of the land of Britain. It has been scanned and a video produced.

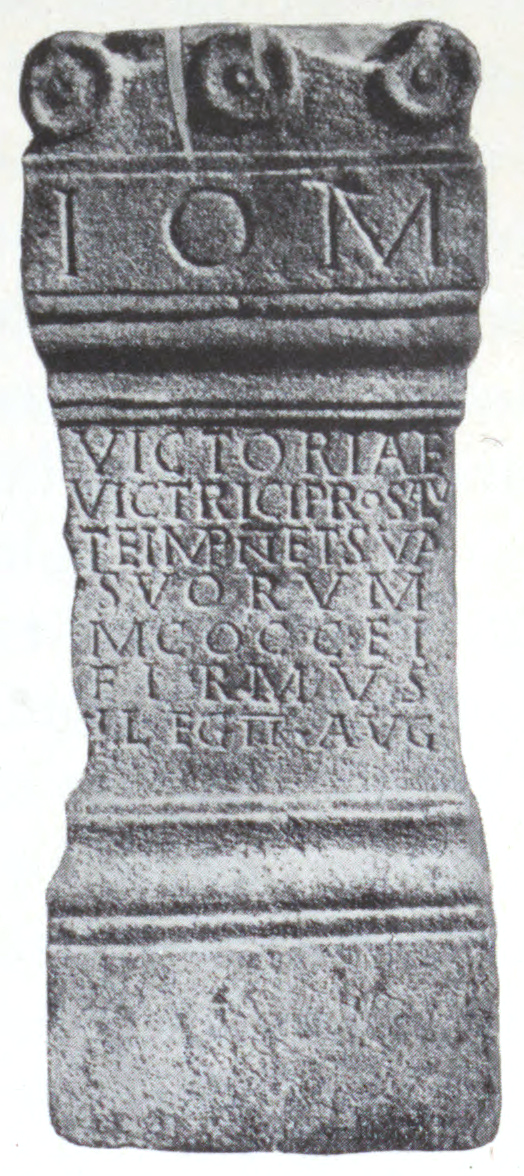
RIB 2176. Altar dedicated to Jupiter and Victorious Victory. It has been scanned and a video produced.

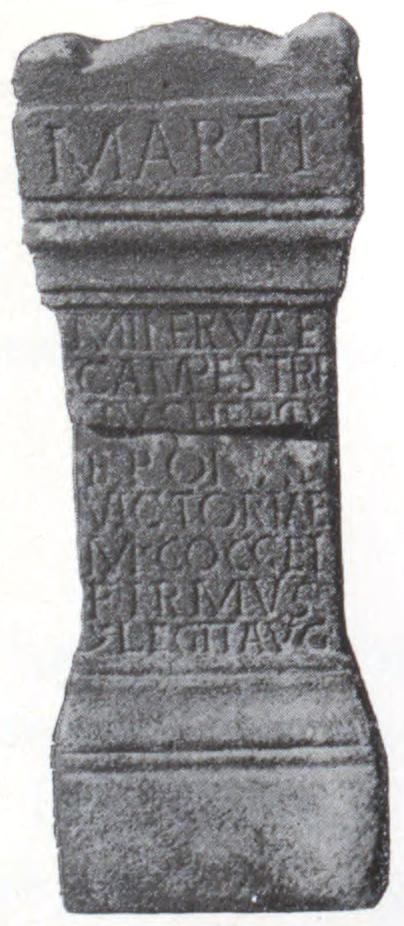
RIB 2177. Altar dedicated to Silvanus. It has been scanned and a video produced.

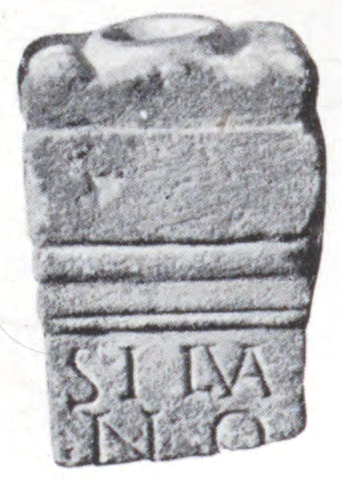
RIB 2178. Altar dedicated to Silvanus. It has been scanned and a video produced.

== Other Finds ==
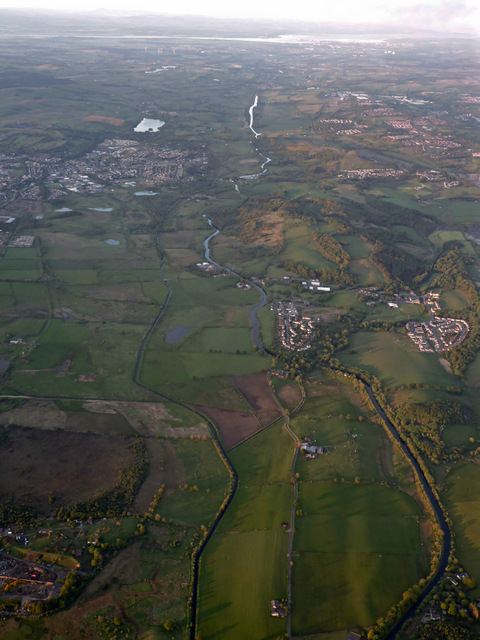
View from the air above Auchendavy towards Shirva, Twechar and the Firth of Forth

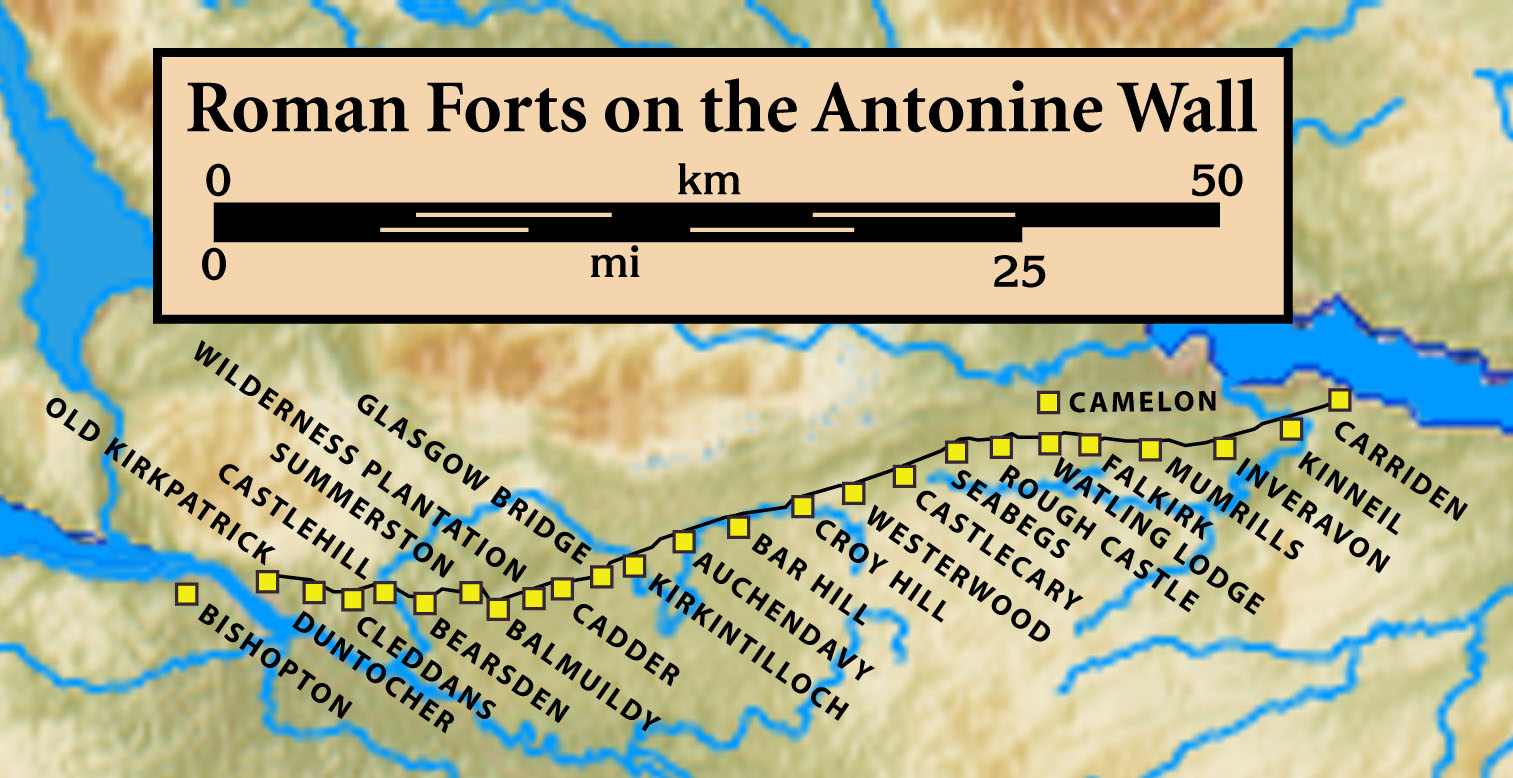
Forts and Fortlets associated with the Antonine Wall from west to east: Bishopton, Old Kilpatrick, Duntocher, Cleddans, Castlehill, Bearsden, Summerston, Balmuildy, Wilderness Plantation, Cadder, Glasgow Bridge, Kirkintilloch, Auchendavy, Bar Hill, Croy Hill, Westerwood, Castlecary, Seabegs, Rough Castle, Camelon, Watling Lodge, Falkirk, Mumrills, Inveravon, Kinneil, Carriden

A distance slab by the 20th Legion Valiant was found. A fragment of a male torso was found too.

Gordon and others speak of coins; a gold solidus of Trajan is mentioned. The ballista bullets are said to have been upwards of fifty in number. Two iron mallets were also found.

Many other artefacts have also been found at Shirva, near Twechar.

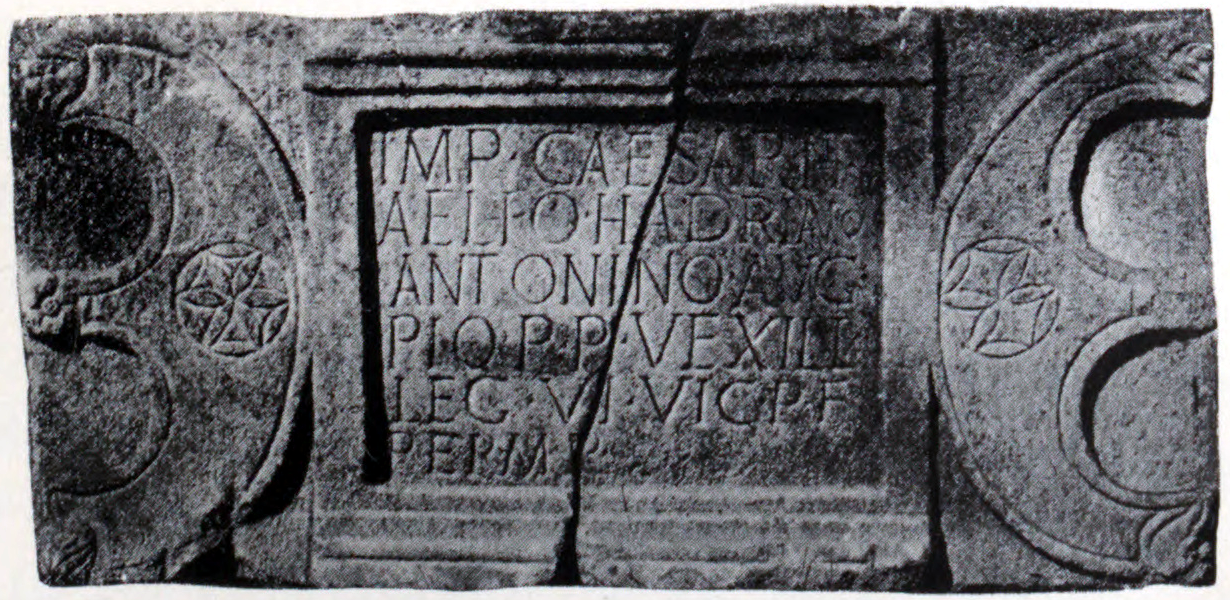
RIB 2185. Distance Slab of the Sixth Legion. George MacDonald calls in no. 3 in the 2nd edition of his book The Roman Wall in Scotland. It was found on near the discovery site of the 20th Legion's slab: on Eastermains Farm (which adjoins Whitehill), west of Inchbelly Bridge, east of Kirkintilloch. It has been scanned and a video produced. It is similar to two other distance slabs of the Sixth Legion as shown below. In 2020 a replica of the Eastermains stone was installed in Twechar.

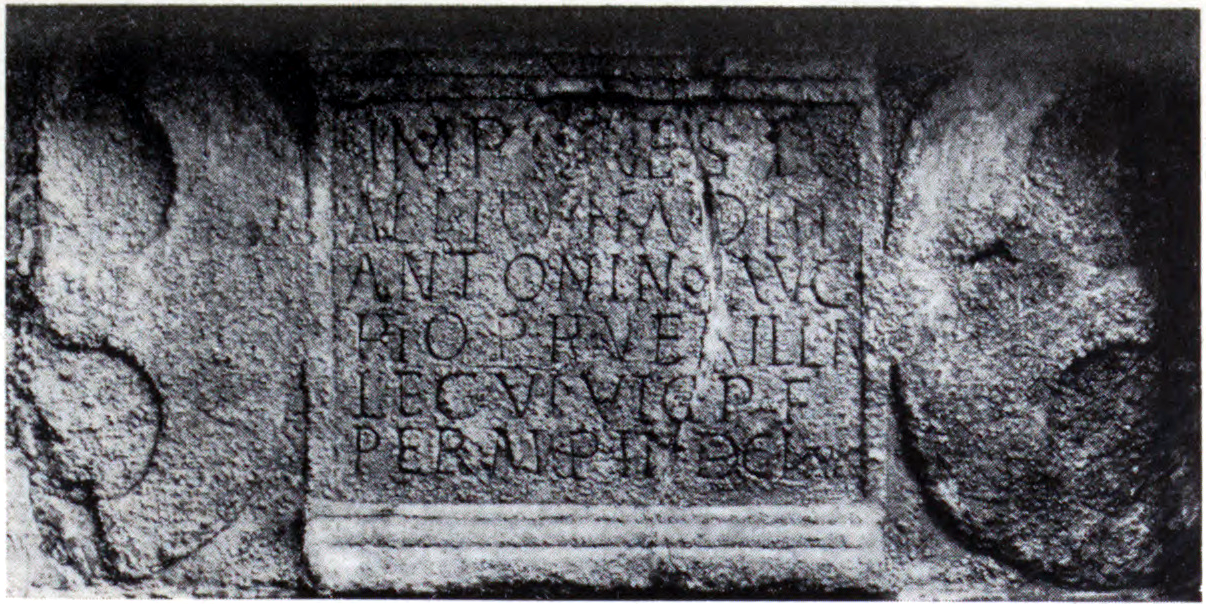
Weathered Distance Slab of the Sixth Legion. George MacDonald calls in no. 7 in the 2nd edition of his book The Roman Wall in Scotland. It was found on East Millichen Farm, Summerston. It has been scanned and a 3D model and a video have been produced.

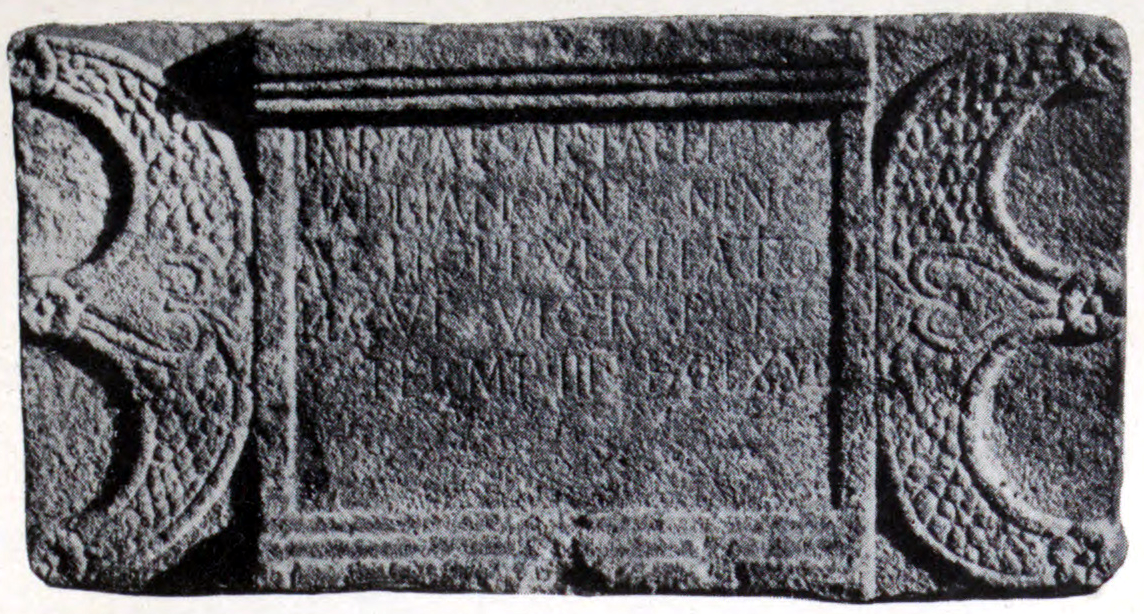
RIB 2196. Distance Slab of the Sixth Legion George MacDonald calls in no. 8 in the 2nd edition of his book The Roman Wall in Scotland and describes it as belonging to Castlehill or its neighbourhood.

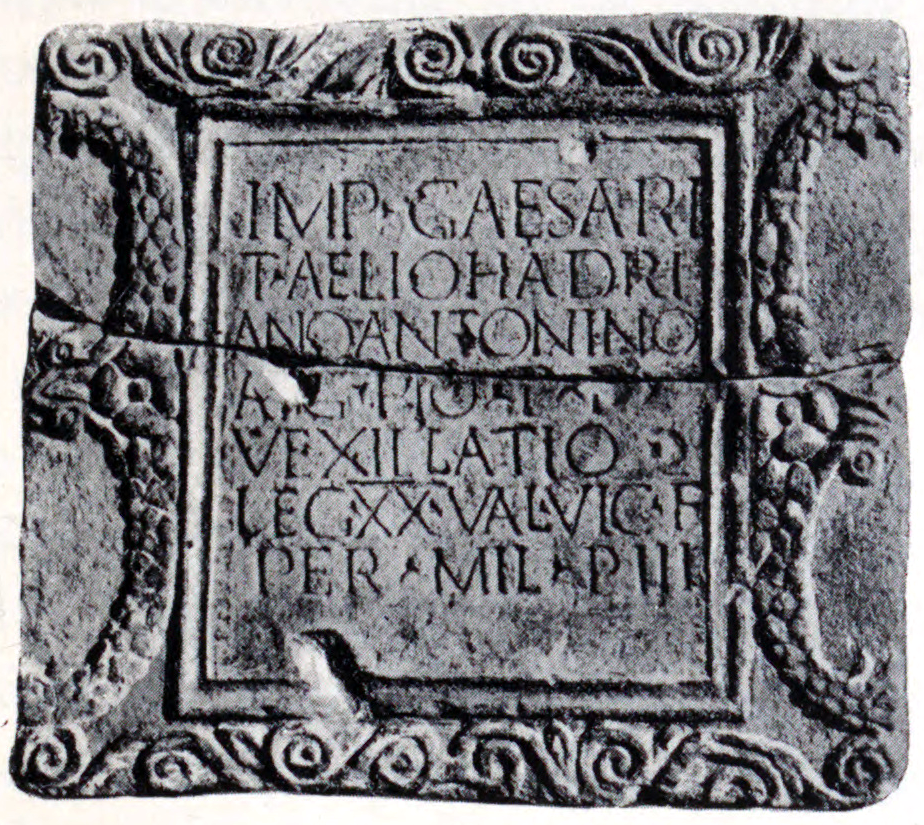
RIB 2173. Distance Slab of the Twentieth Legion George MacDonald calls in no. 2 in the 2nd edition of his book The Roman Wall in Scotland. He argues, over many pages, that was originally "somewhere east of Auchendavy".

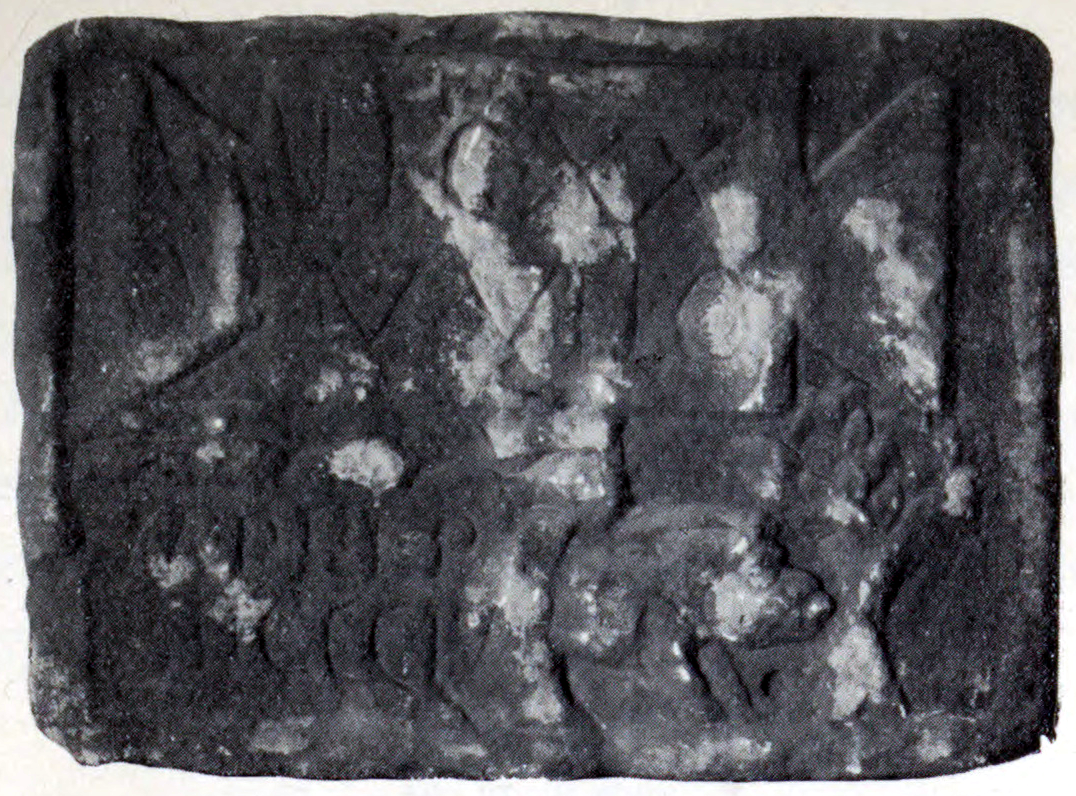
RIB 2184. Distance slab of the Twentieth Legion. George MacDonald calls in no. 4 in the 2nd edition of his book The Roman Wall in Scotland and describes it as belonging to Eastfield Farm. It was found at Eastermains Farm. It has been scanned and a video produced.
