= Wilderness Plantation =

Site of Roman fortler

Coordinates: 55.9215°N 4.2452°W

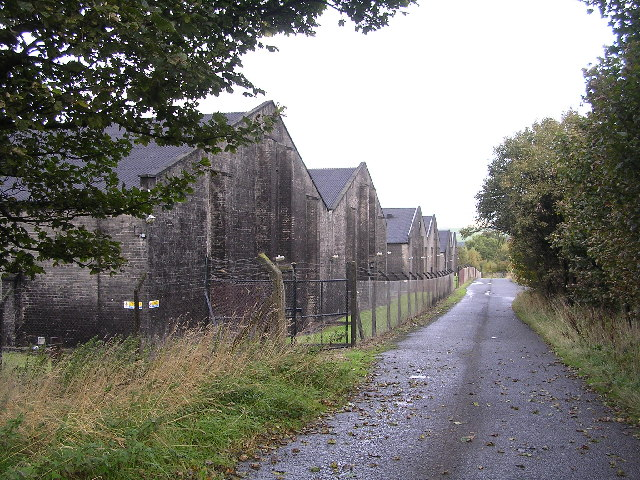
- Bonded warehouses near the site of the Roman Fortlet
- Interactive map of Wilderness Plantation
- Location: East Dunbartonshire, United Kingdom

History
- Built: Antoninus Pius

Site notes
- Excavation dates: 1965, 1966
- Discovered: 1965
- Condition: under crops

Wilderness Plantation was the site of a Roman fortlet on the Antonine Wall in Scotland.

The line of the Antonine Wall runs roughly parallel between the River Kelvin to the north and the Forth and Clyde Canal to the south.

The site, like several others along the wall and beyond, was found by aerial photography, this discovery being reported in October 1965. Following this Wilkes excavated in that year and the following one. He approved of the term "interval fortlet" to describe this and other fortlets like Duntocher and Glasgow Bridge.

The neighbouring forts to this fortlet are Balmuildy in the west and Cadder in the east.

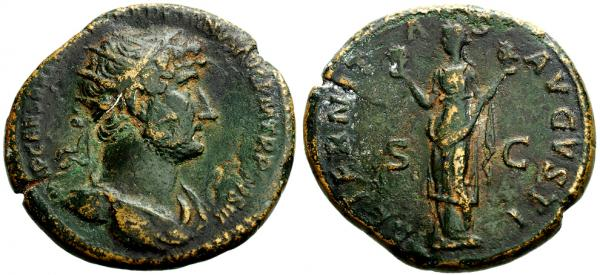
A single Hadrian dupondius coin was found at Wilderness West.

No coinage has been recovered nor are there any inscriptions from the fortlet although a single coin was picked up at Wilderness West.

Many Roman forts along the wall held garrisons of around 500 men. Larger forts like Castlecary and Birrens had a nominal cohort of 1000 men but probably sheltered women and children as well although the troops were not allowed to marry. There is likely too to have been large communities of civilians around the site.

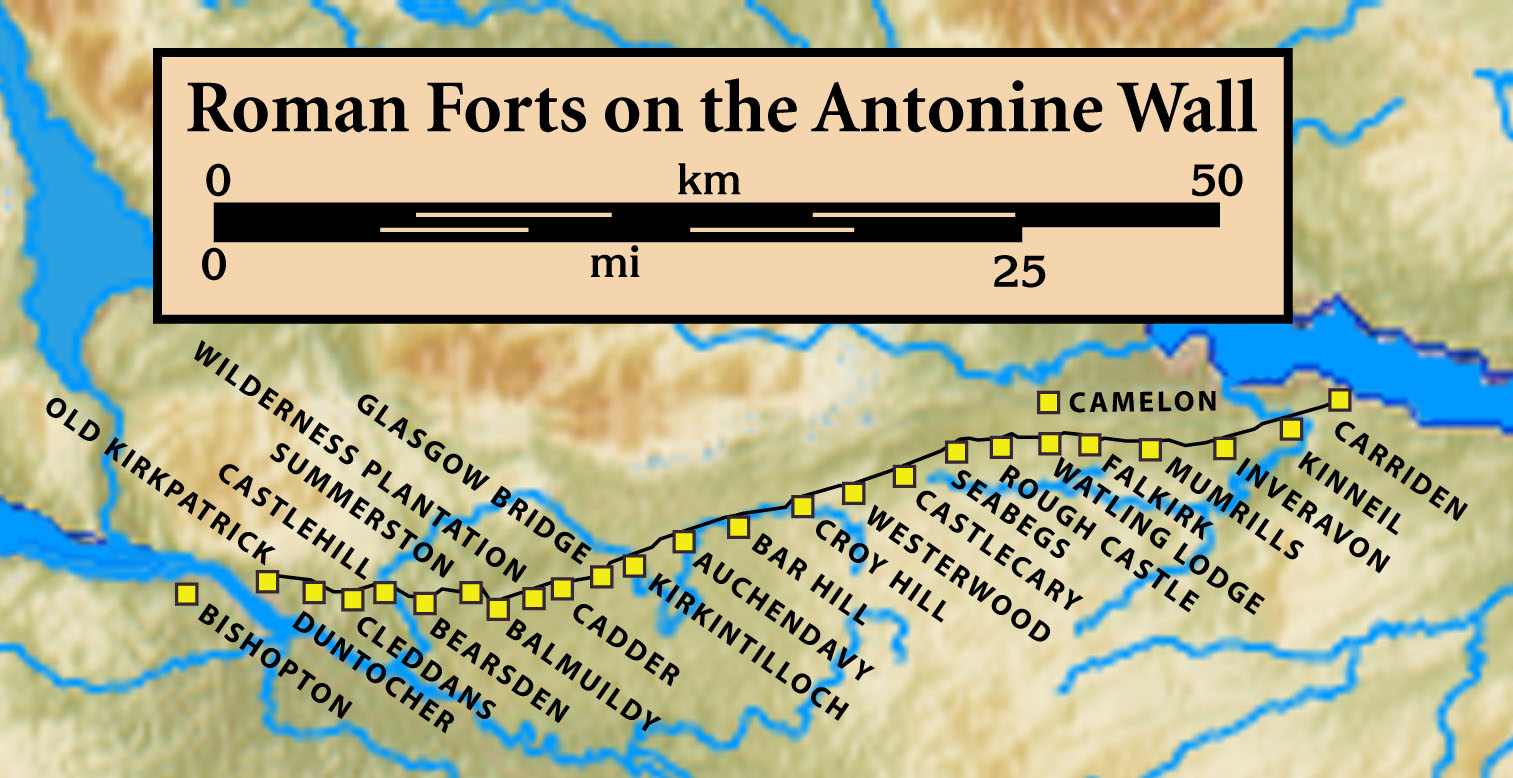
Forts and Fortlets associated with the Antonine Wall from west to east: Bishopton, Old Kilpatrick, Duntocher, Cleddans, Castlehill, Bearsden, Summerston, Balmuildy, Wilderness Plantation, Cadder, Glasgow Bridge, Kirkintilloch, Auchendavy, Bar Hill, Croy Hill, Westerwood, Castlecary, Seabegs, Rough Castle, Camelon, Watling Lodge, Falkirk, Mumrills, Inveravon, Kinneil, Carriden
