= Seabegs Wood =

Site of a Roman fortlet on the Antonine Wall in Scotland

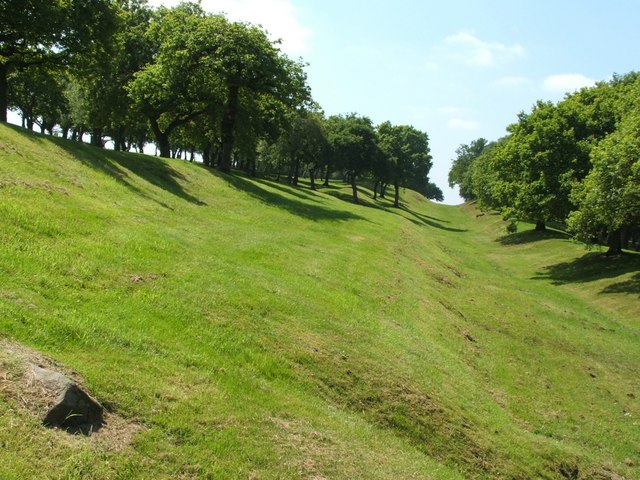

- Location within Scotland Central Belt Location within Scotland
- 55.99241°N 3.8995°W
- Location: Bonnybridge, Falkirk, Scotland

History
- Founded: 142 AD
- Built: Antoninus Pius

Site notes
- Condition: Ruined

Seabegs Wood was the site of a Roman fortlet on the Antonine Wall in Scotland.

At Seabegs, the outline of Antonine's Wall has lasted. Archaeologists from previous generations recorded this and stated that the ditch was deep and waterlogged.

There is an underpass under the Forth and Clyde Canal nearby known locally as the Pend.

In the 1890s, the Antonine Wall Committee of Glasgow Archaeological Society's cut several trenches across the Roman rampart. These uncovered its stone base. Subsequent excavations in 1977 found a Roman fortlet attached to the south of the Rampart. In 1981, a mound was examined but little has been discovered. Seabegs Wood was a portion of the ancient Barony of Seabegs. Seabegs Wood is part of a UNESCO World Heritage Site representing the best preserved portion of the ancient Roman Antonine Wall. The Seabegs Collection of Ancient Roman Coinage was donated to Dalhousie University, Halifax, Nova Scotia, Canada to commemorate this connection and consists of gold, silver and bronze portrait coinage depicting the majority of the ancient Roman emperors.

The forts to this fortlet are Castlecary in the west and Rough Castle in the east. Sir George Macdonald and others theorized that because these neighbouring forts were relatively widespread another structure was likely in the Seabegs area.

No coinage has been recovered nor any inscriptions. There are two marching camps nearby at Dalnair and Milnquarter.

Many Roman forts along the wall held garrisons of around 500 men. Larger forts like Castlecary and Birrens had a nominal cohort of 1000 men but probably sheltered women and children as well although the troops were not allowed to marry. There is likely too to have been large communities of civilians around the site.

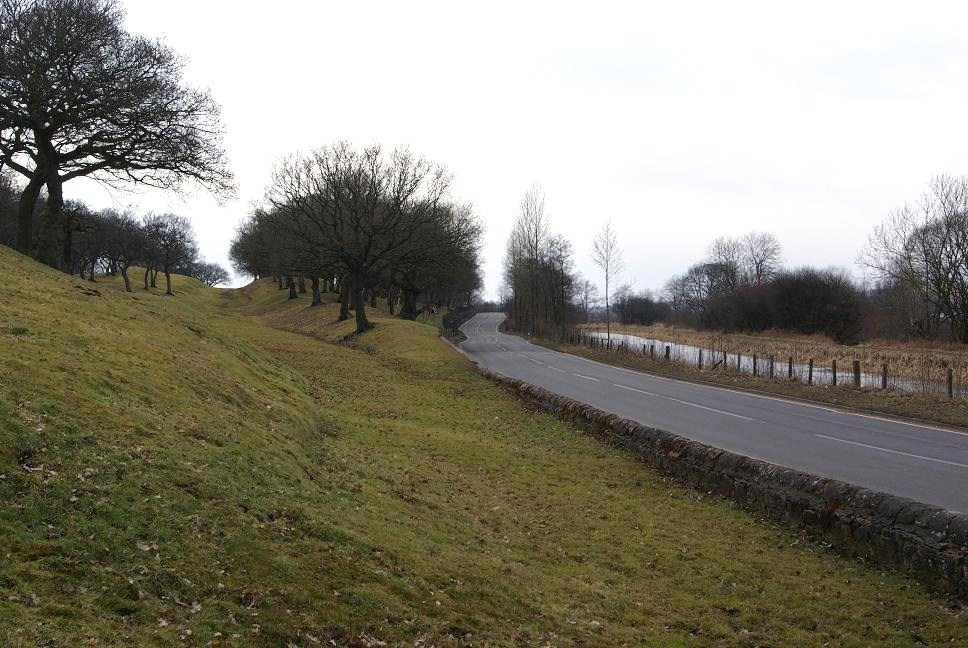
The Wall, The Road and The Forth and Clyde Canal at Seabegs Wood

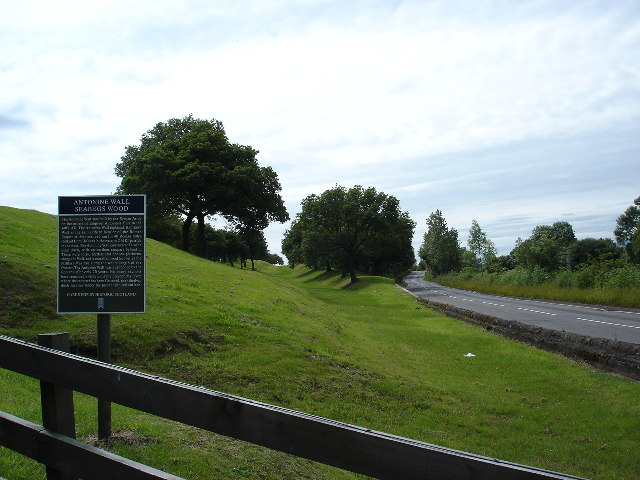
Seabegs Wood and the Antonine Wall between Bonnybridge and Allandale

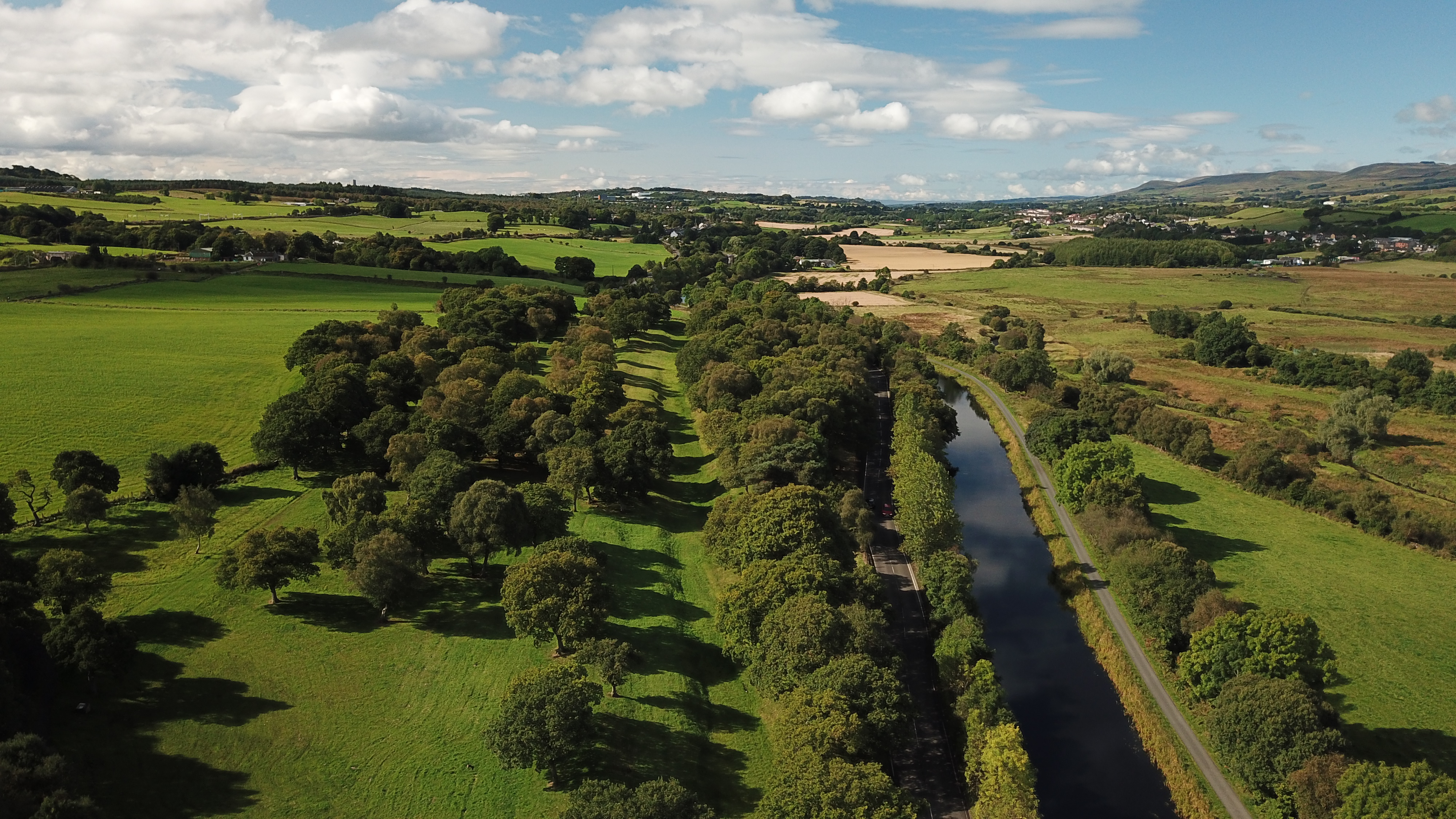
Antonine Wall West of Bonnybridge

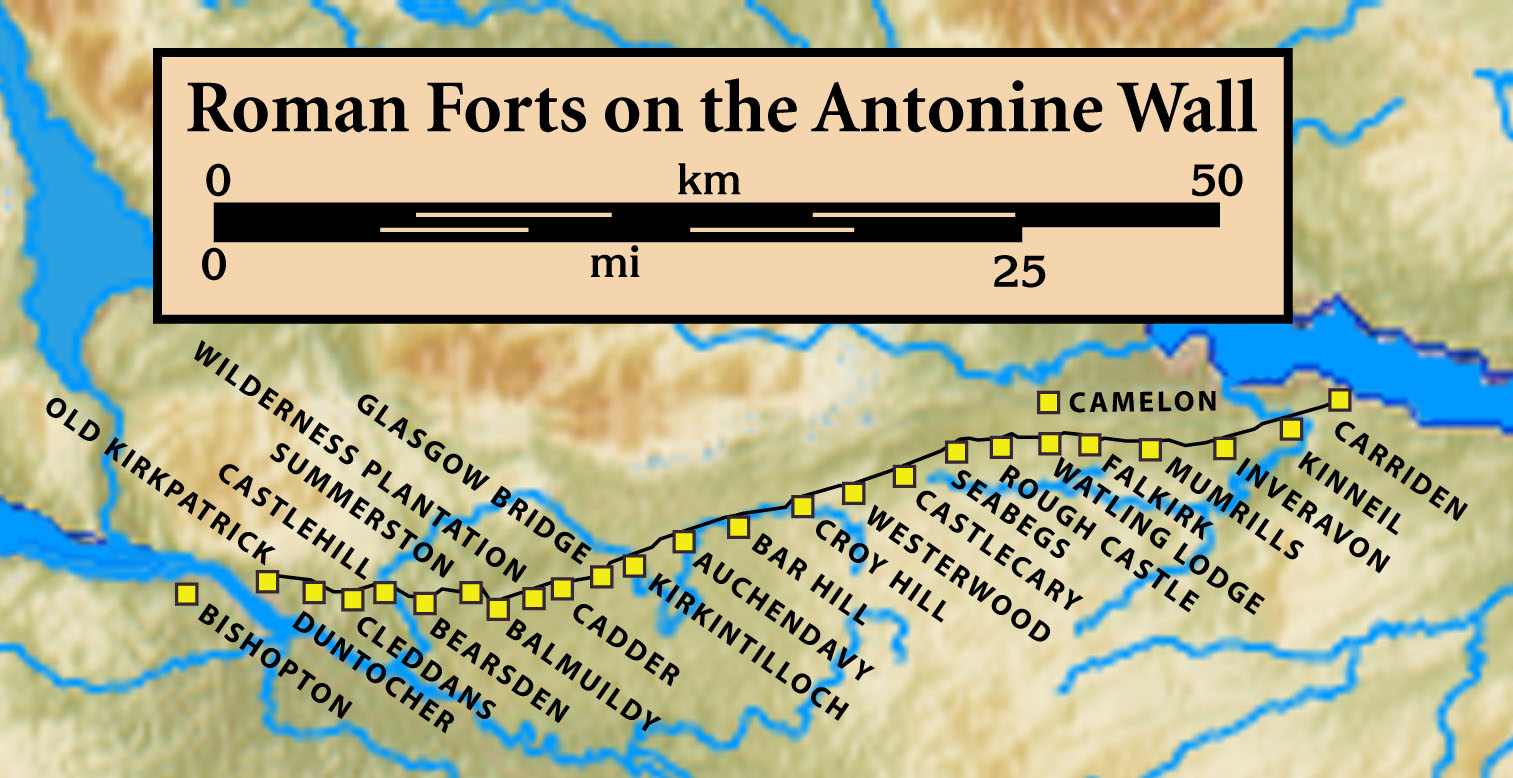
Forts and Fortlets associated with the Antonine Wall from west to east: Bishopton, Old Kilpatrick, Duntocher, Cleddans, Castlehill, Bearsden, Summerston, Balmuildy, Wilderness Plantation, Cadder, Glasgow Bridge, Kirkintilloch, Auchendavy, Bar Hill, Croy Hill, Westerwood, Castlecary, Seabegs, Rough Castle, Camelon, Watling Lodge, Falkirk, Mumrills, Inveravon, Kinneil, Carriden
