= Castlehill Fort =

Roman fort in Scotland

Coordinates: 55.9245°N 4.3633°W

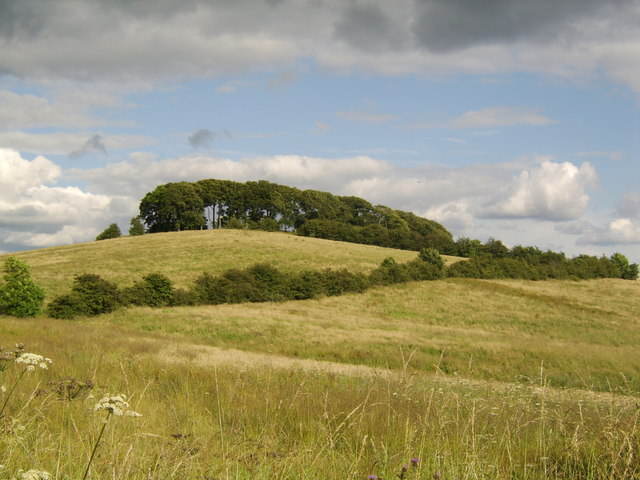
- Castle Hill, East Dunbartonshire
- Interactive map of Castlehill Fort
- Location: East Dumbartonshire, United Kingdom

History
- Built: Antoninus Pius

Castlehill was a Roman fort on the Antonine Wall in Scotland.

== Location ==
The fort is located in East Dunbartonshire, west of Bearsden and east of Duntocher, south of the A810 Duntocher Road. Its neighbouring forts are Bearsden to the east and Duntocher to the west although there is a fortlet at Cleddans in between, with Hutcheson Hill nearer still. A circular enclosed plantation of beech trees is about all a visitor can see nowadays. The summit of Castlehill provides a wide panorama overlooking many historical finds.

It's sometimes hard to see the exact line of the Antonine Wall at the location but there is some existing signage.

In the 1900s several historians gave their own idiosyncratic descriptions of the site.

== Finds ==
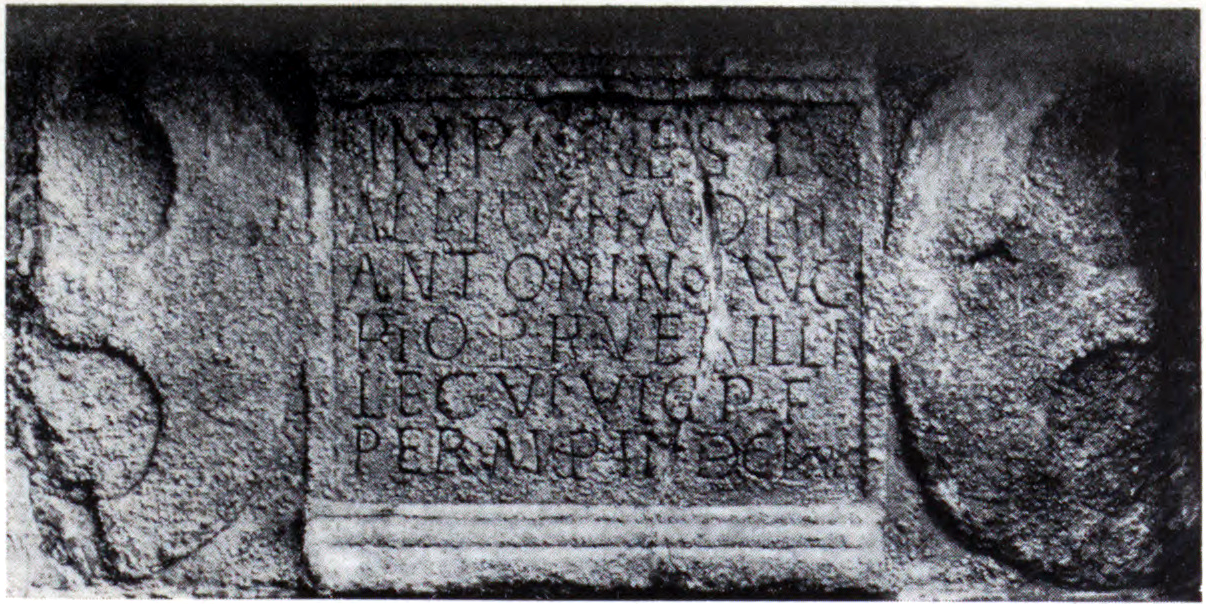
Weathered Distance Slab of the Sixth Legion. George MacDonald calls in no. 7 in the 2nd edition of his book The Roman Wall in Scotland. It was found on Low Millichen Farm. It has been scanned and a 3D model produced.

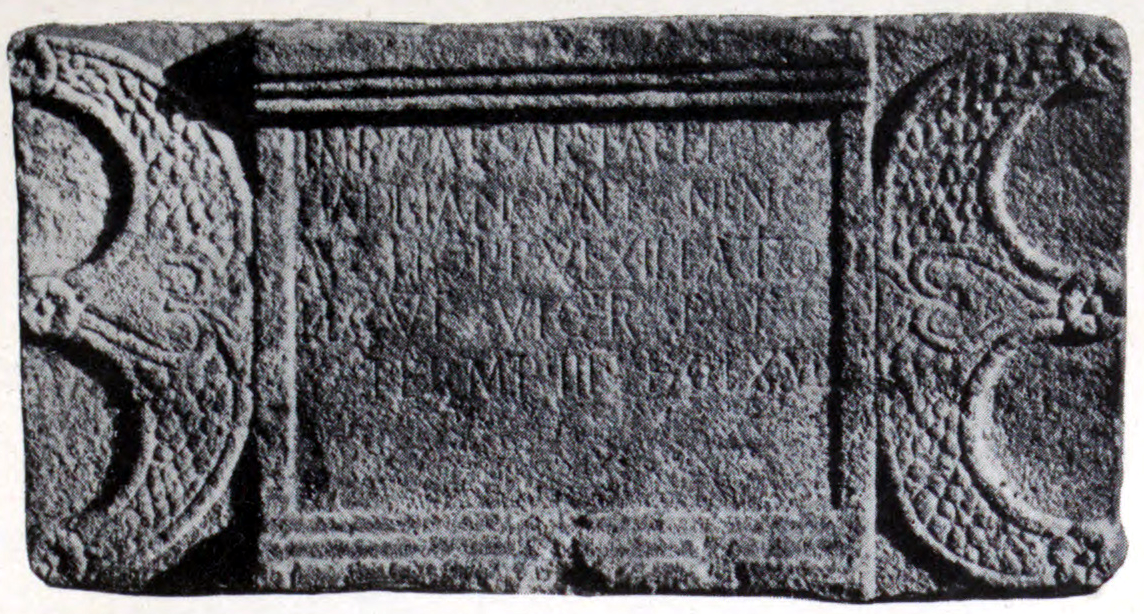
RIB 2196. Distance Slab of the Sixth Legion George MacDonald calls in no. 8 in the 2nd edition of his book The Roman Wall in Scotland and describes it as belonging to Castlehill or its neighbourhood.

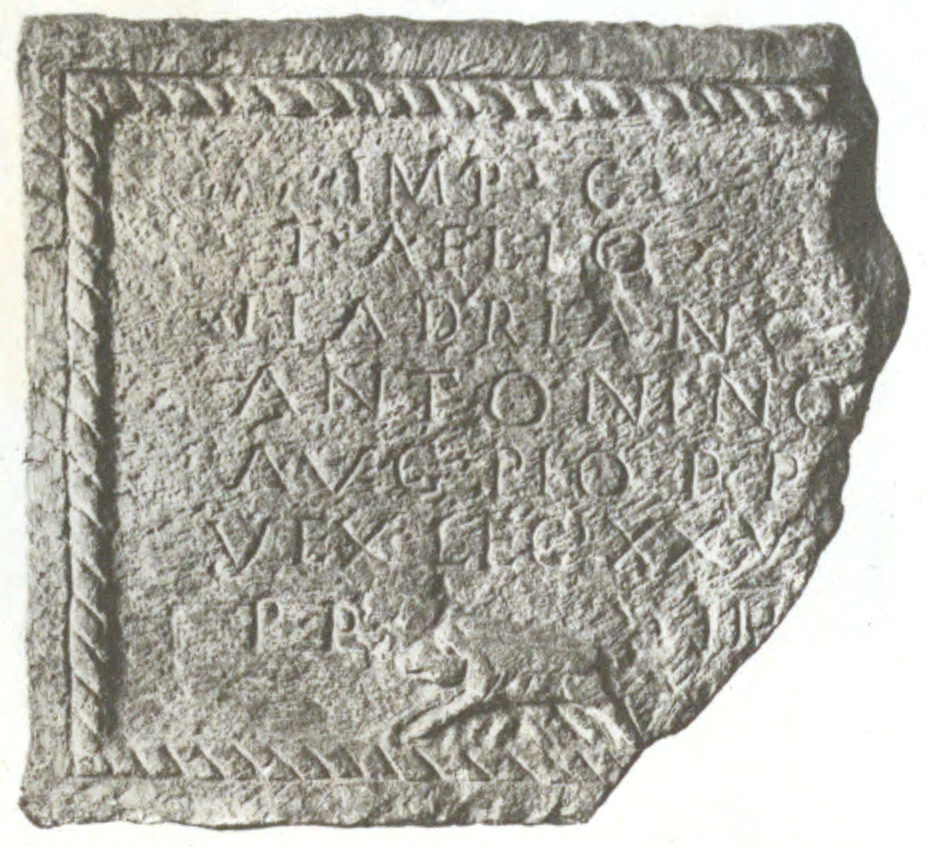
RIB 2197. Distance Slab of the Twentieth Legion Valeria Victrix George MacDonald calls in no. 9 in the 2nd edition of his book The Roman Wall in Scotland.

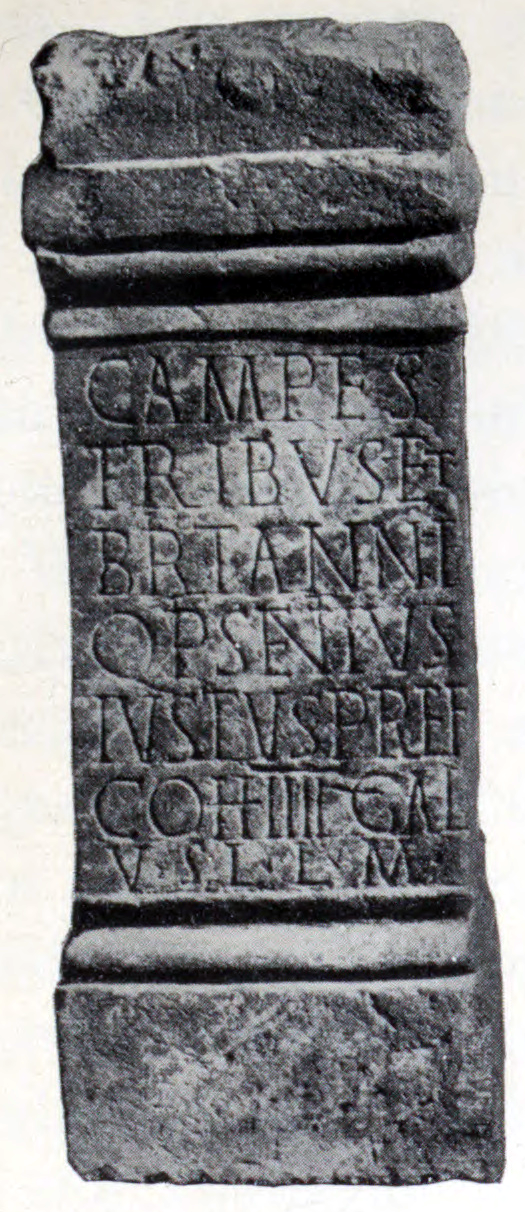
RIB 2195. Altar dedicated to the Goddesses of the Parade-ground and Britannia. George MacDonald calls in no. 52 in the 2nd edition of his book The Roman Wall in Scotland. Scans of the altar have been made and a video produced.

Two Roman distance slabs were found at the site. One can be compared with another found near Summerston. Both these similar slabs, like two others from Duntocher have two decorative pelta shields, one on either side of the slab. The horns of each shield are embellished with three rosettes on the Castlehill slab whereas the Summerston slab has these end in two griffins' heads.

The first, badly weathered, slab has four rosettes between the shields and the inscription. It was found in 1803 on Low Millochan farm. The farm, later called East Millichen, is near Summerston. It was built into a dovecote and records the building of 3666.5 paces of wall by the Sixth Legion. MacDonald describes the work as course and relates that some of the abbreviations are unusual. He suggests that it stood side-by-side with what he calls no. 6 (RIB 2193) at Summerston. On the similar Castlehill slab (RIB 2196) he suggests the stone-cutter has blundered and made a letter P where he should have a letter F (for Fidelis) on the fourth line. The Castlehill slab also records 3666.5 paces although the units used are a matter of ongoing research.

Another was found by a neighbouring farmer in 1826.

A Roman altar was found in the same year.

Many Roman forts along the wall held garrisons of around 500 men. Larger forts like Castlecary and Birrens had a nominal cohort of 1000 men but probably sheltered women and children as well although the troops were not allowed to marry. There is likely too to have been large communities of civilians around the site.

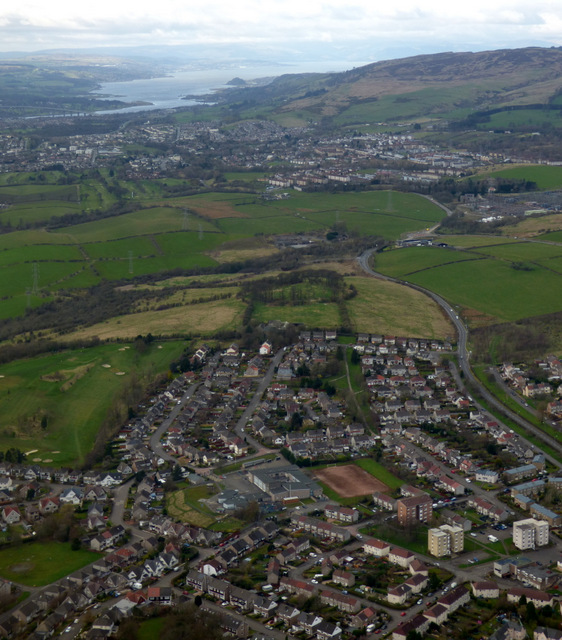
view from above Bearsden looking along the course of the Antonine Wall to Castle Hill (the ring of trees in the centre), the widening River Clyde and Dumbarton Rock can be seen in the distance, beyond the Erskine Bridge. Bar Hill has a similar aerial view to the east.

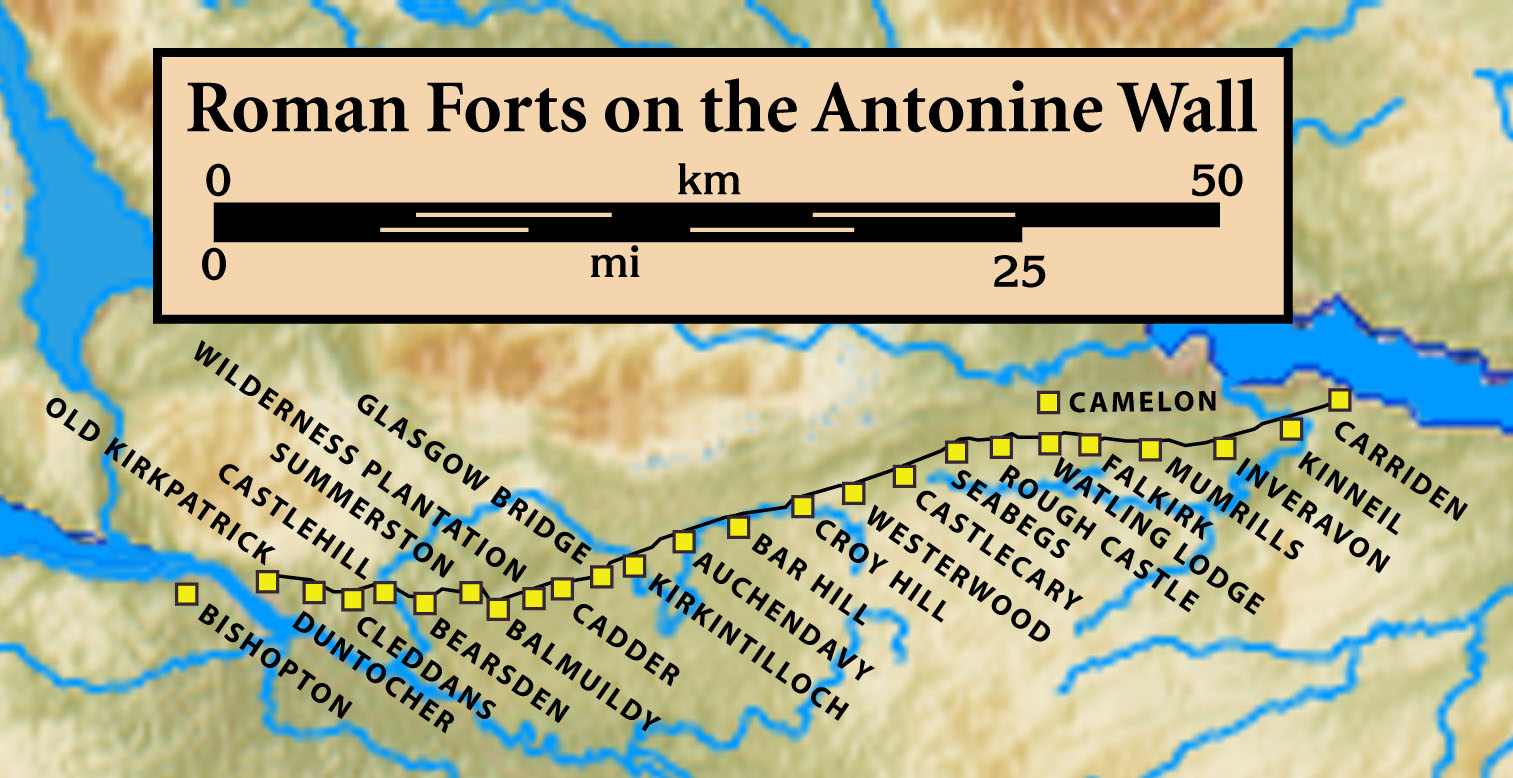
Forts and Fortlets associated with the Antonine Wall from west to east: Bishopton, Old Kilpatrick, Duntocher, Cleddans, Castlehill, Bearsden, Summerston, Balmuildy, Wilderness Plantation, Cadder, Glasgow Bridge, Kirkintilloch, Auchendavy, Bar Hill, Croy Hill, Westerwood, Castlecary, Seabegs, Rough Castle, Camelon, Watling Lodge, Falkirk, Mumrills, Inveravon, Kinneil, Carriden
