= Glasgow Bridge, Kirkintilloch =

Site of Roman fortlet on the Antonine Wall in East Dunbartonshire, central Scotland

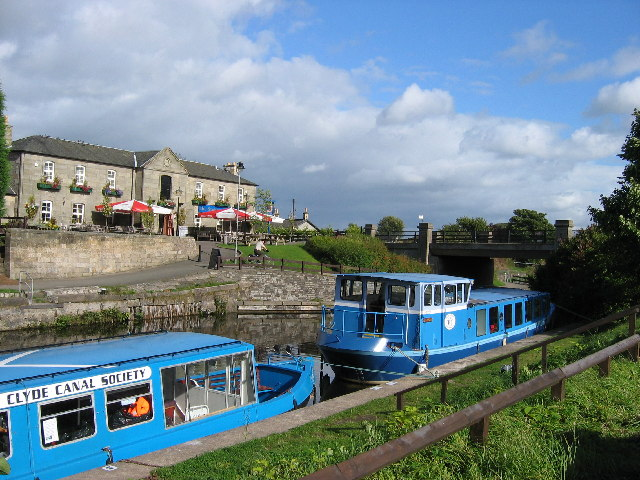
Stables Inn and Glasgow Bridge on Forth and Clyde Canal, near Kirkintilloch

Glasgow Bridge is the site of a road bridge over the Forth and Clyde Canal; it is also the site of a Roman fortlet, on the Antonine Wall, halfway between the Roman forts at Kirkintilloch and Cadder.

== The Road Bridge ==
The road bridge (55.9308°N 4.1871°W) was built as a swing bridge. It now allows road users on the A803 to cross the canal. The bridge links Cadder and Kirkintilloch and has undergone repairs over the years. When the canal was closed, the water at the bridge was run through a culvert. The bridge was reinstated in the 1990s for the re-opening of the canal. Just west of this bridge, a basin allows boats to launch from a slip. This bridge is halfway between Glasgow and Kilsyth and is marked on the first six-inch-to-the-mile (approximately 1:10000) OS map.

== The Stables ==
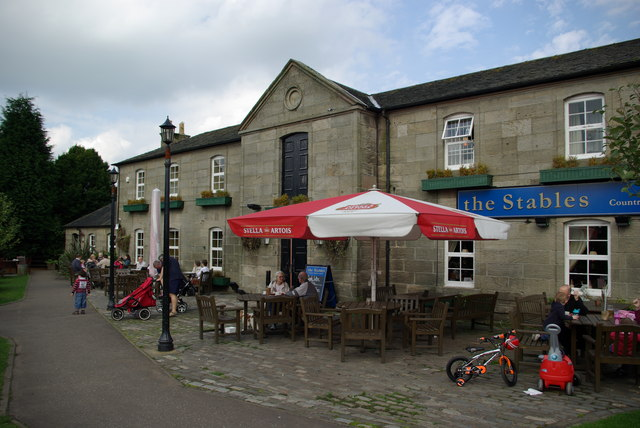
The Stables - pub and restaurant

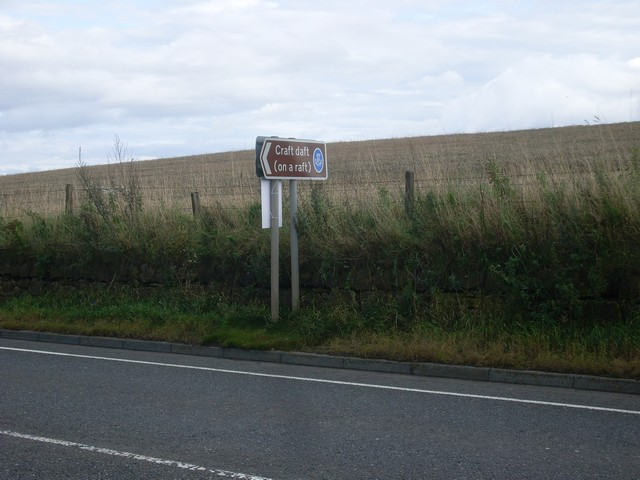
Craft daft (on a raft) Scotland's best-named tourist attraction?

Horses were often used on the canal tow path. Their work on the canal is celebrated at its eastern extension at The Helix with two unique equine sculptures known as The Kelpies.

The 'Stables' bar and restaurant was developed from the stables which supported the horses which serviced the canal work. The road sign outside informs drivers of the location of Craft daft (on a raft). Note this has now moved to Southbank Marina in Kirkintilloch.

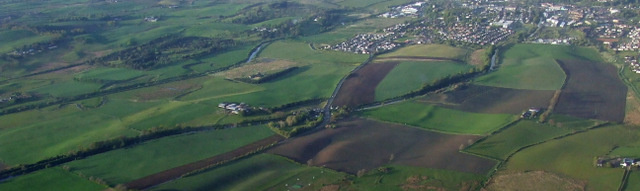
Glasgow Bridge towards Kirkintilloch

== The Roman Fortlet ==
The fortlet (55.9314°N 4.1842°W) can sometimes be seen in photographs taken from aircraft which have been taken at various times since 1955. Nothing identifiably Roman can be seen at the site anymore. There have been no excavations to date. Aerial photography has however highlighted an area of around 20 m square, which could have been secured with the help of the turf rampart with its ditch. It has been speculated that a bridge, across the ditch, may have granted admission to the frontier. The site of the fortlet is just east of the bridge over the Forth and Clyde Canal which carries the A803. Kirkintilloch is east of the site with Low Moss to the south. There is a temporary Roman camp at Easter Cadder about one-half mile (one kilometre) away. This is on a raised piece of ground approximately mid-way between the Glasgow Bridge fortlet and the main Roman fort at Kirkintilloch. If walking west, the line of the Wall changes course after the site of Glasgow Bridge Fortlet.

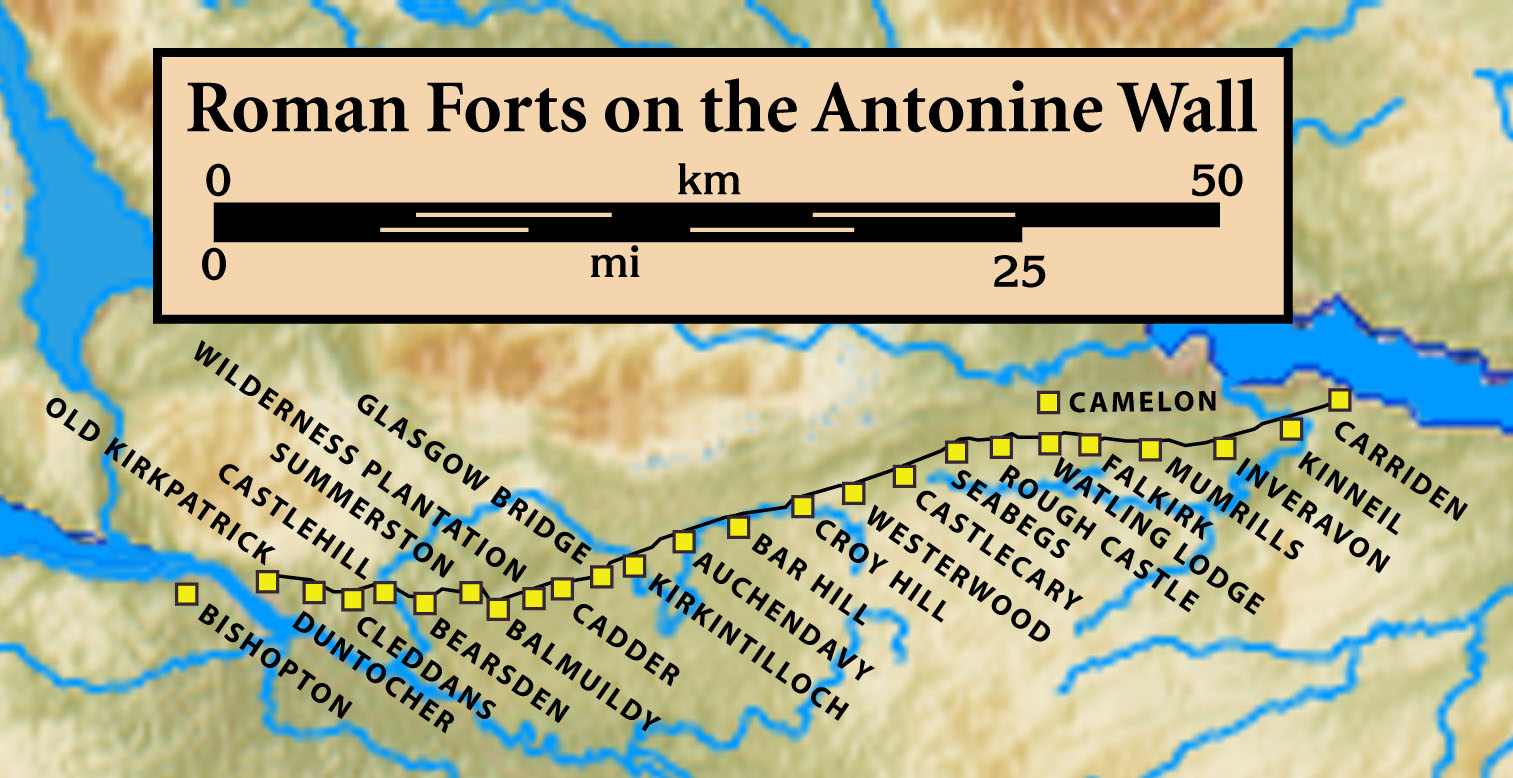
Forts and Fortlets associated with the Antonine Wall from west to east: Bishopton, Old Kilpatrick, Duntocher, Cleddans, Castlehill, Bearsden, Summerston, Balmuildy, Wilderness Plantation, Cadder, Glasgow Bridge, Kirkintilloch, Auchendavy, Bar Hill, Croy Hill, Westerwood, Castlecary, Seabegs, Rough Castle, Camelon, Watling Lodge, Falkirk, Mumrills, Inveravon, Kinneil, Carriden
