= List of listed buildings in Falkirk, Falkirk =

This is a list of listed buildings in the parish of Falkirk in the council area of Falkirk, Scotland.

== List ==
Name	Location	Date listed	Geo-coordinates	Notes	Category	LB number	Image
142-146 High Street			55°59′57″N 3°46′59″W		B	31184	Upload Photo
Falkirk And Counties Trustee Savings Bank High Street And 1 Cow Wynd			55°59′56″N 3°47′01″W		C(S)	31191	Upload Photo
Lint Riggs West Side. (Even Nos) 20-24 High Street And A Anderson & Son, Newmarket Street			56°00′00″N 3°47′13″W		B	31196	Upload Photo
Wellington Statue Newmarket Street			56°00′02″N 3°47′06″W		B	31204	Upload Photo
St Andrews Church Of Scotland Including Halls Newmarket Street			56°00′01″N 3°47′07″W		C(S)	31205	Upload Photo
24-38 Vicar Street Corner Of Newmarket Street And 2-12 Melville Street			56°00′03″N 3°47′05″W		C(S)	31209	Upload Photo
9-11 Vicar Street			56°00′02″N 3°47′03″W		C(S)	31210	Upload Photo
Bank Of Scotland 39-43 Vicar Street			56°00′04″N 3°47′02″W		B	31211	Upload Photo
Technical Institute Princes Street & Park Street			56°00′03″N 3°46′59″W		C(S)	31213	Upload Photo
5 Booth Place			55°59′53″N 3°47′02″W		C(S)	31217	Upload Photo
Old Parish Church And Burial Ground Including Boundary Walls And Railings			56°00′01″N 3°47′09″W		A	31167	Upload Photo
Lochgreen Farmhouse			55°58′30″N 3°53′39″W		B	13326	Upload Photo
1 Polmont Road, Laurieston			55°59′44″N 3°44′46″W		B	12876	Upload Photo
Castlecary, Red Burn Viaduct			55°58′54″N 3°56′41″W		B	10520	Upload another image See more images
Callendar Park, Policy Walls			55°59′21″N 3°47′15″W		C(S)	50896	Upload Photo
105-111 High Street			55°59′56″N 3°47′04″W		C(S)	31186	Upload Photo
157-161 High Street			55°59′56″N 3°46′58″W		C(S)	31194	Upload Photo
Offices (Russel And Aitken, A M Cowan) East Side Of King's Court And North Side Of Bean Row At Rear Of 9 Cow Wynd			55°59′54″N 3°47′02″W		B	31195	Upload Photo
Lint Riggs, East Side (Odd Nos) 32-34 High Street And New Market Bar Newmarket Street			56°00′01″N 3°47′11″W		B	31197	Upload Photo
South African War Memorial Newmarket Street			56°00′02″N 3°47′11″W		C(S)	31203	Upload Photo
Cow Wynd Tattie Kirk			55°59′52″N 3°46′58″W		B	31216	Upload Photo
58, 60 Graham's Road			56°00′17″N 3°47′04″W		B	31228	Upload Photo
Grahamston Church Of Scotland, Bute St			56°00′25″N 3°46′57″W		B	31231	Upload Photo
Union Inn Tamfourhill Road Port Downie			55°59′58″N 3°49′02″W		B	31233	Upload another image See more images
Canal Inn Canal Street			56°00′02″N 3°48′53″W		C(S)	31247	Upload Photo
Thornhill Road, Saint James' Parish Church Including Halls, Boundary Walls, Gates And Railings			56°00′20″N 3°46′37″W		B	31253	Upload Photo
Parish Church Churchyard			56°00′00″N 3°47′08″W		B	31168	Upload Photo
Royal Bank Buildings 2 High Street And 1 Newmarket Street			56°00′01″N 3°47′16″W		B	31170	Upload Photo
Royal Bank, High Street, 1-9 Kirk Wynd And 27, 29 Manor Street			55°59′58″N 3°47′04″W		B	31173	Upload Photo
100, 100A High Street			55°59′58″N 3°47′04″W		B	31174	Upload Photo
High Bonnybridge, Broomhill Road, St Helen's Church			55°59′34″N 3°52′33″W		C(S)	13346	Upload Photo
Callendar Park, Callendar House, Stable Block, Including Dovecot, Cobbled Yard, Implement Shed, Boundary Walls And Gates			55°59′43″N 3°46′13″W		B	46544	Upload Photo
25 And 27 Vicar Street With 4 And 6 Princes Street			56°00′03″N 3°47′03″W		C(S)	48693	Upload Photo
29 - 35 (Odd Nos) Vicar Street, Vicar Chambers			56°00′03″N 3°47′03″W		B	48694	Upload Photo
138-140 And 140A High Street			55°59′57″N 3°47′00″W		B	31183	Upload Photo
Royal Bank Buildings 25-29 Newmarket Street And 20 Vicar Street			56°00′02″N 3°47′05″W		B	31206	Upload Photo
Former Post Office (Front Block Only) 45, 47 Vicar Street			56°00′05″N 3°47′02″W		B	31212	Upload Photo
7 Booth Place			55°59′53″N 3°47′03″W		C(S)	31218	Upload Photo
Callendar Park, Glenbrae Lodge And Gates			55°59′30″N 3°47′19″W		B	31235	Upload Photo
Callendar Park, Callendar House, Stable Court, Including Cobbled Yard			55°59′43″N 3°46′11″W		B	31239	Upload Photo
Callendar Park, Callendar House Mausoleum			55°59′29″N 3°45′32″W		A	31241	Upload Photo
Woodend Farm Hallglen			55°59′13″N 3°45′46″W		C(S)	31244	Upload Photo
Falkirk Parish Churchyard Gate			56°00′00″N 3°47′10″W		B	31169	Upload Photo
130 High Street			55°59′57″N 3°47′01″W		C(S)	31181	Upload Photo
132-136A High Street			55°59′57″N 3°47′00″W		C(S)	31182	Upload Photo
42-46 (Even Nos) Newmarket Street			56°00′03″N 3°47′05″W		C(S)	48689	Upload Photo
Underwood House Including Gatepiers And Boundary Wall			55°59′21″N 3°55′09″W		C(S)	50223	Upload Photo
Tamfourhill Road, Watling Lodge, And Stables Including Gatepiers And Garden Steps			55°59′53″N 3°49′31″W		B	50226	Upload Photo
Hodge Street And Cockburn Street, Erskine Parish Church (Church Of Scotland) Including Church Hall And Boundary Wall			55°59′52″N 3°47′21″W		C(S)	51113	Upload Photo
Rosebank Distillery, Camelon Road, Falkirk			56°00′08″N 3°48′13″W		B	44184	Upload Photo
148-154 High Street			55°59′57″N 3°46′57″W		B	31185	Upload Photo
St Modan's Church Cochrane Avenue			55°59′48″N 3°47′10″W		B	31220	Upload Photo
Camelon Church Of Scotland, Glasgow Road, Camelon			56°00′15″N 3°49′03″W		C(S)	31234	Upload Photo
Cottage At Lock 11 Forth And Clyde Canal			56°00′10″N 3°48′12″W		C(S)	31246	Upload Photo
Cross Well. High Street			55°59′57″N 3°47′04″W		B	31177	Upload another image
Castle Cary			55°58′31″N 3°56′45″W		A	10519	Upload another image See more images
Bonnybridge, St Helen's Parish Church, High Street			56°00′07″N 3°53′33″W		C(S)	49997	Upload Photo
Callendar Park, Callendar House, Atrium House (Former Gardener's Cottage), Including Gatepiers			55°59′46″N 3°45′44″W		C(S)	50224	Upload Photo
Hope Street, St Francis-Xavier Rc Church			56°00′05″N 3°47′19″W		B	51649	Upload Photo
129-131 High Street			55°59′56″N 3°47′02″W		B	31190	Upload Photo
Social Work Department (Former Municipal Bldgs) Newmarket Street			56°00′03″N 3°47′10″W		C(S)	31207	Upload another image
Christian Institute, 16, 18 Newmarket Street And 1, 3 Glebe Street			56°00′03″N 3°47′09″W		C(S)	31208	Upload Photo
17 Arnothill, Eriden			55°59′55″N 3°47′29″W		B	31223	Upload Photo
Kilns House Kilns Road			56°00′07″N 3°47′40″W		B	31225	Upload Photo
Royal Hotel High Street			56°00′01″N 3°47′15″W		C(S)	31171	Upload Photo
Falkirk Town Steeple. High Street			55°59′57″N 3°47′03″W		A	31178	Upload another image See more images
1 Bank Street And 19, 21 Kirk Wynd, Former Co-Operative Department Store			56°00′00″N 3°47′03″W		C(S)	51579	Upload Photo
19 And 19A Arnothill, Arnothall, Including Former Stables, Boundary Walls, Railings And Gatepiers			55°59′57″N 3°47′22″W		C(S)	51613	Upload Photo
113-117 High Street			55°59′57″N 3°47′04″W		B	31187	Upload Photo
147, 149 High Street, 2 Cow Wynd			55°59′56″N 3°46′59″W		B	31192	Upload Photo
West Church West Bridge Street			56°00′01″N 3°47′21″W		B	31198	Upload Photo
Christ Church Episcopal Church Kerse Lane			56°00′00″N 3°46′40″W		C(S)	31215	Upload Photo
Arnotdale Camelon Road			56°00′07″N 3°47′51″W		B	31224	Upload Photo
Callendar Park, Callendar House			55°59′40″N 3°46′02″W		A	31236	Upload Photo
Callendar Park, Callendar House, Dry Bridge			55°59′39″N 3°46′32″W		C(S)	31240	Upload Photo
Cottage At Lock 9 Forth & Clyde Canal			56°00′15″N 3°48′00″W		C(S)	31245	Upload Photo
22, 24 Canal Street			56°00′02″N 3°48′50″W		C(S)	31248	Upload Photo
Former Railway Bridge Across River Carron Carron Iron Works			56°01′15″N 3°47′52″W		B	31250	Upload Photo
Slamannan Road Lochgreen Hospital Main Block Boundary Wall And Gatepiers			55°59′19″N 3°48′12″W		B	31251	Upload Photo
Glasgow Road, Camelon, St Mary Of The Angels Roman Catholic Church And Presbytery			56°00′17″N 3°49′23″W		A	31252	Upload Photo
122 High Street			55°59′57″N 3°47′02″W		C(S)	31179	Upload Photo
124-128 High Street			55°59′57″N 3°47′01″W		B	31180	Upload Photo
Laurieston House, Including Boundary Wall And Gateway, 2 Polmont Road			55°59′45″N 3°44′44″W		B	13404	Upload Photo
20 - 24 (Even Nos) Newmarket Street			56°00′03″N 3°47′08″W		C(S)	48688	Upload Photo
150-154 Grahams Road, The Star Inn			56°00′26″N 3°47′04″W		C(S)	51119	Upload Photo
119-121 High Street			55°59′56″N 3°47′03″W		C(S)	31188	Upload Photo
151-155 High Street			55°59′56″N 3°46′58″W		C(S)	31193	Upload Photo
Sheriff Court House Buildings, Hope Street And West Bridge Street			56°00′02″N 3°47′18″W		B	31200	Upload another image
9 Hope Street			56°00′09″N 3°47′20″W		B	31202	Upload Photo
Orchard Hotel Kerse Lane			56°00′00″N 3°46′55″W		B	31214	Upload Photo
Mount House Pleasance Gardens			55°59′53″N 3°47′14″W		C(S)	31219	Upload Photo
Hatherley Hotel Arnothill			55°59′58″N 3°47′49″W		B	31221	Upload Photo
Callendar Park, Callendar House Sundial			55°59′37″N 3°46′04″W		B	31238	Upload Photo
Union Canal Tunnel			55°59′19″N 3°47′35″W		B	31242	Upload Photo
Bridge No 62 Union Canal			55°59′34″N 3°48′03″W		B	31243	Upload Photo
Weir Carron Iron Works			56°01′14″N 3°47′59″W		B	31249	Upload Photo
106-112 High Street			55°59′58″N 3°47′03″W		B	31176	Upload Photo
Obelisk, Marking Site Of Falkirk Battlefield			55°59′24″N 3°48′59″W		B	10521	Upload Photo
Craigieburn Farmhouse Lochgreen Road			55°58′57″N 3°49′48″W		B	10523	Upload Photo
42 And 44 Vicar Street, Firkins Bar And 1-9 (Odd Numbers) Melville Street			56°00′05″N 3°47′05″W		C(S)	48690	Upload Photo
52 - 58 (Even Nos) Vicar Street			56°00′06″N 3°47′05″W		B	48692	Upload Photo
Laurieston, Mumrills Road, Mumrills House Including Courtyard/Garden Walls And Outbuildings			55°59′50″N 3°44′12″W		B	50158	Upload Photo
Tamfourhill Road, Oakdene, Including Gatepiers And Gate			55°59′52″N 3°49′11″W		B	50225	Upload Photo
Callendar Park, Wellhead			55°59′25″N 3°47′09″W		C(S)	50897	Upload Photo
102-104 Grahams Road, Former Oddfellows Hall			55°59′57″N 3°47′22″W		C(S)	51542	Upload Photo
123-127 High Street Falkirk Herald Building			55°59′56″N 3°47′03″W		C(S)	31189	Upload Photo
Public Library Hope Street			56°00′06″N 3°47′19″W		B	31201	Upload Photo
Mayfield, Maggie Woods Loan And Arnothill Lane			55°59′58″N 3°47′52″W		B	31222	Upload Photo
Red Lion Inn Bankside At Bainsford Bridge			56°00′40″N 3°47′08″W		C(S)	31232	Upload Photo
Callendar Park, Callendar House, Small Bridge On South Axis Of House			55°59′38″N 3°46′04″W		B	31237	Upload Photo
86, 88 High Street And 2 Kirk Wynd			55°59′58″N 3°47′06″W		C(S)	31172	Upload Photo
102, 104 High Street			55°59′58″N 3°47′04″W		B	31175	Upload Photo
Glen Bridge			55°59′02″N 3°47′18″W		B	10522	Upload Photo
Callendar Park, Callendar House, Factor's House			55°59′45″N 3°46′13″W		B	46545	Upload Photo
46 - 50 (Even Nos) Vicar Street			56°00′06″N 3°47′05″W		C(S)	48691	Upload Photo
Bonnybridge, Bonnyside Road, Bonnyside House			55°59′52″N 3°52′13″W		C(S)	49998	Upload Photo
Falkirk, Laurieston, Mumrills Road, Mumrills Farm			55°59′50″N 3°44′09″W		B	50159	Upload Photo
Callendar Park, Kennels			55°59′32″N 3°47′14″W		C(S)	50894	Upload Photo

== Key ==
The scheme for classifying buildings in Scotland is:

- Category A: "buildings of national or international importance, either architectural or historic; or fine, little-altered examples of some particular period, style or building type."
- Category B: "buildings of regional or more than local importance; or major examples of some particular period, style or building type, which may have been altered."
- Category C: "buildings of local importance; lesser examples of any period, style, or building type, as originally constructed or moderately altered; and simple traditional buildings which group well with other listed buildings."

In March 2016 there were 47,288 listed buildings in Scotland. Of these, 8% were Category A, and 50% were Category B, with the remaining 42% being Category C.

== See also ==
- List of listed buildings in Falkirk (council area)
