= Falkirk (disambiguation) =

Falkirk is a town in Scotland.

Falkirk may also refer to:

== Council areas and Parliament constituencies ==
- Falkirk (council area), Scottish local government council area
- Falkirk Burghs (UK Parliament constituency)
- Falkirk East (UK Parliament constituency)
- Falkirk (UK Parliament constituency)
- Falkirk West (UK Parliament constituency)

== Battles ==
- Battle of Falkirk (1298)
- Battle of Falkirk Muir (1746)

== Other uses ==
- Falkirk F.C., an association football team
- Falkirk Steeple, a landmark which dominates the skyline of Falkirk in central Scotland
- Falkirk Wheel, a rotating boat lift in central Scotland, connecting the Forth and Clyde Canal with the Union Canal
- Falkirk Center for Faith and Liberty, a think tank operated by Liberty University
- Leland Falkirk, character in Dean Koontz's novel Strangers
