= Old Sheriff Court, Falkirk =

Judicial building in Falkirk, Scotland

Old Sheriff Court
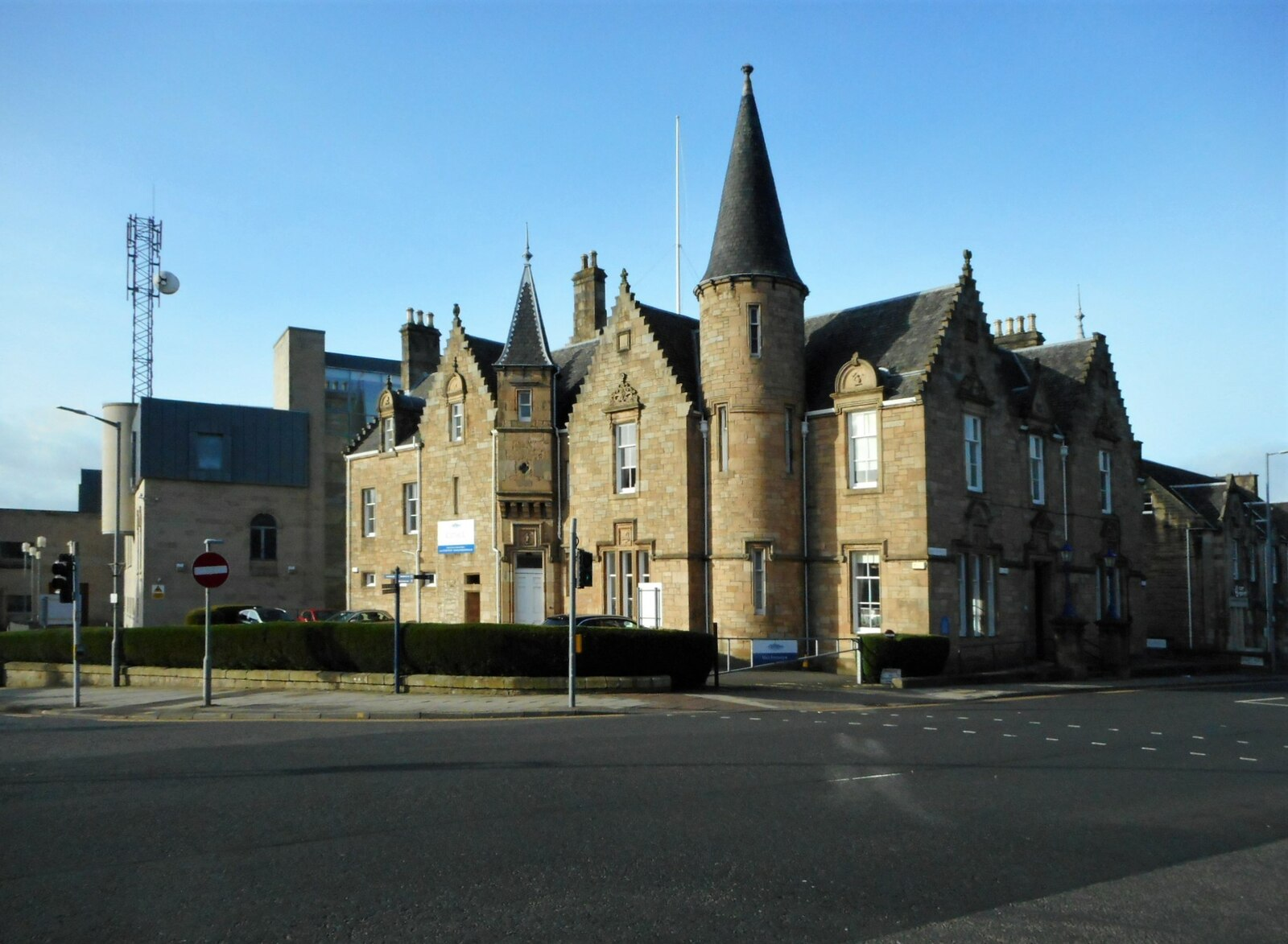
- The building in 2023

- Shown in Falkirk
- 56.0006°N 3.7884°W
- Location: Hope Street, Falkirk

History
- Built: 1868

Site notes
- Architect(s): Thomas Brown II and James Maitland Wardrop
- Architectural style: Scottish baronial style

Listed Building – Category B
- Official name: Former Sheriff Court including boundary walls, gatepiers and lamp stands, 1 Hope Street, Falkirk
- Designated: 23 April 1979
- Reference no.: LB31200

The Old Sheriff Court is a judicial building on Hope Street in Falkirk in Scotland. The building, which currently accommodates a firm of funeral directors, is a Category B listed building.

== History ==
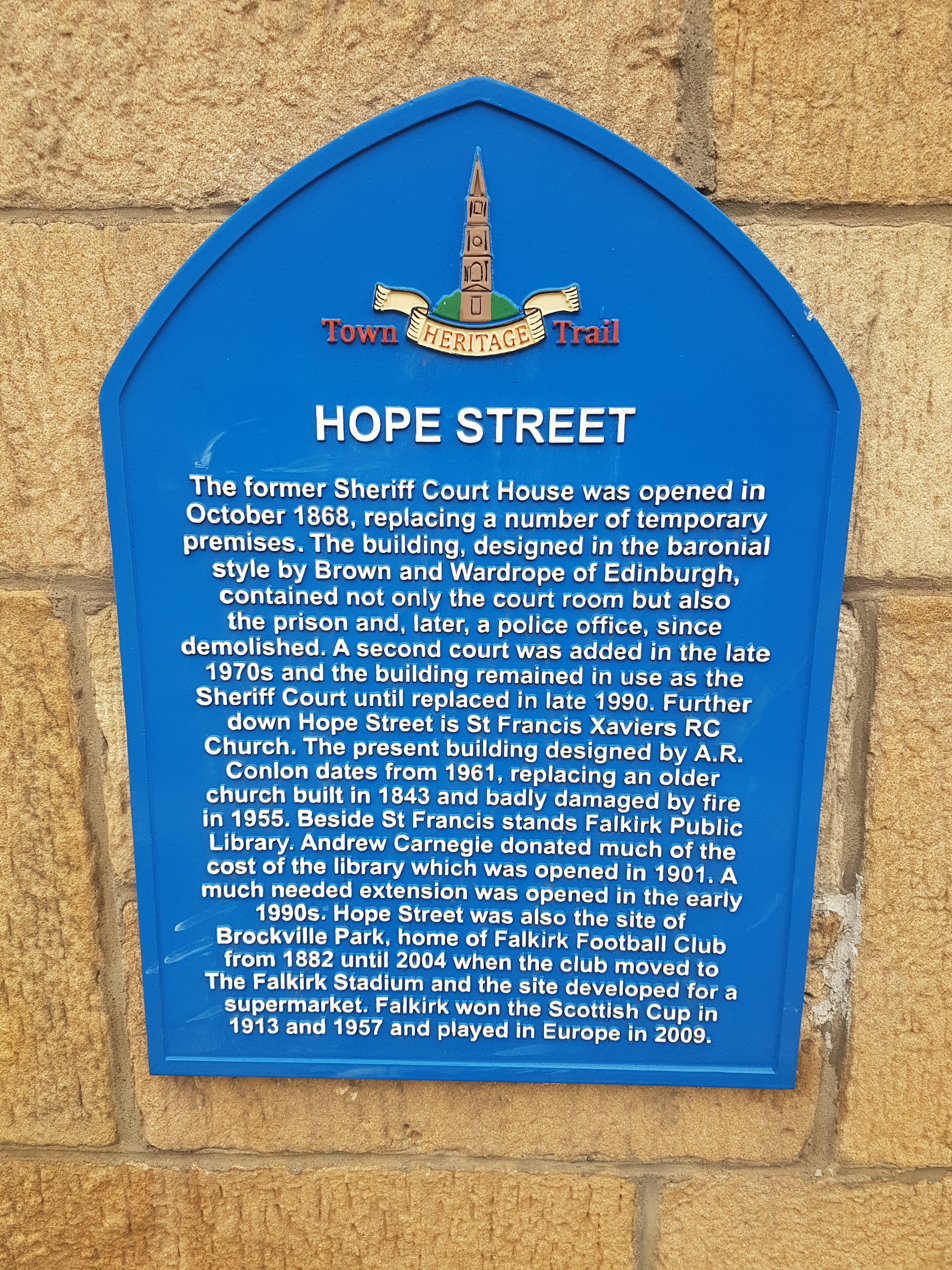
Plaque on the building

The first judicial building in the town was the Falkirk Steeple which incorporated several prison cells and was completed in 1814. However, court hearings were held in various locations, including the Assembly Rooms at the corner of Rankine's Lane and The Pleasence, the Red Lion Inn in the High Street, and the sheriff's offices at 14 High Street. Hearings were removed to a small office behind Wilson's Buildings, which were at 105–111 High Street, in 1848. In the mid-19th century, court officials decided that a dedicated courthouse was needed. The site they selected was on the corner of Hope Street and West Bridge Street.

The foundation stone for the new building was laid on 29 June 1866. It was designed by Thomas Brown II and James Maitland Wardrop in the Scottish baronial style, built by R. & A. Berry of Edinburgh in ashlar stone at a cost of around £7,500, and was completed in October 1868.

The design involved an asymmetrical main frontage of four bays facing onto Hope Street. The second bay on the left, which was recessed, featured a doorway with a hood mould incorporating a carved panel on the ground floor, and a sash window with a triangular pediment and finials on the first floor. The first and third bays were fenestrated by tripartite windows with hood moulds incorporating carved panels on the ground floor, and by sash windows with cornices and carvings on the first floor, all surmounted by stepped gables. The right-hand bay, which was recessed, was fenestrated by a sash window with a hood mould incorporating a carved panel on the ground floor, and by a sash window with a round headed pediment on the first floor. There was a bartizan to the right of the third bay on the main frontage, and a four-stage circular tower on the south side. Internally, the principal rooms were offices for the sheriff's clerk and for the procurator fiscal, together with seven prison cells, on the ground floor, and a courtroom, with a hammerbeam roof, on the first floor.

As the number of court cases in Falkirk grew, it became necessary to commission a modern courthouse for criminal matters, and hearings moved to the new Falkirk Sheriff Court in 1990. The old sheriff court was subsequently used as used as the Falkirk Volunteer Centre, before being converted for use as the offices of a firm of funeral directors, Thomas Cuthell & Sons, in 2007.

== See also ==
- List of listed buildings in Falkirk, Falkirk
