= List of bus stations in Scotland =

This is a list of bus stations in Scotland.

== List ==
Name	Location	Stances	Connections
Aberdeen bus station	Aberdeen		Aberdeen railway station, Union Square
Ayr bus station	Ayr	14	
Buchanan bus station	Glasgow	57	Glasgow Queen Street railway station, Buchanan Street subway station (200 metre walk)
Dunfermline bus station	Dunfermline	14	
East Kilbride bus station	East Kilbride	14	
Edinburgh bus station	Edinburgh	18	Edinburgh Waverley railway station (200 metre walk), St Andrew Square tram stop
Elgin bus station	Elgin	7	
Falkirk bus station (closed 2018)	Falkirk		
Glenrothes bus station	Glenrothes	16	Kingdom Shopping Centre
Govan subway station	Glasgow (Govan)	7	
Greenock bus station	Greenock	8	
Hamilton bus station	Hamilton	14	Hamilton Central railway station
Inverness bus station	Inverness	7	
Kilmarnock bus station	Kilmarnock	11	
Kirkcaldy bus station	Kirkcaldy	14	
Leven bus station	Leven	9	
Partick station	Glasgow (Partick)	6	Interchange station with Glasgow Subway and National Rail services
Perth bus station	Perth	10	Perth railway station (100 metre walk)
Seagate bus station	Dundee	9	
Silverburn bus station	Glasgow (Pollok)	8	Silverburn Shopping Centre
St Andrews bus station	St Andrews	4	
Stirling bus station	Stirling	14	Stirling railway station
Viking bus station	Lerwick		
