= Old Municipal Buildings, Falkirk =

Municipal building in Falkirk, Scotland

Old Municipal Buildings
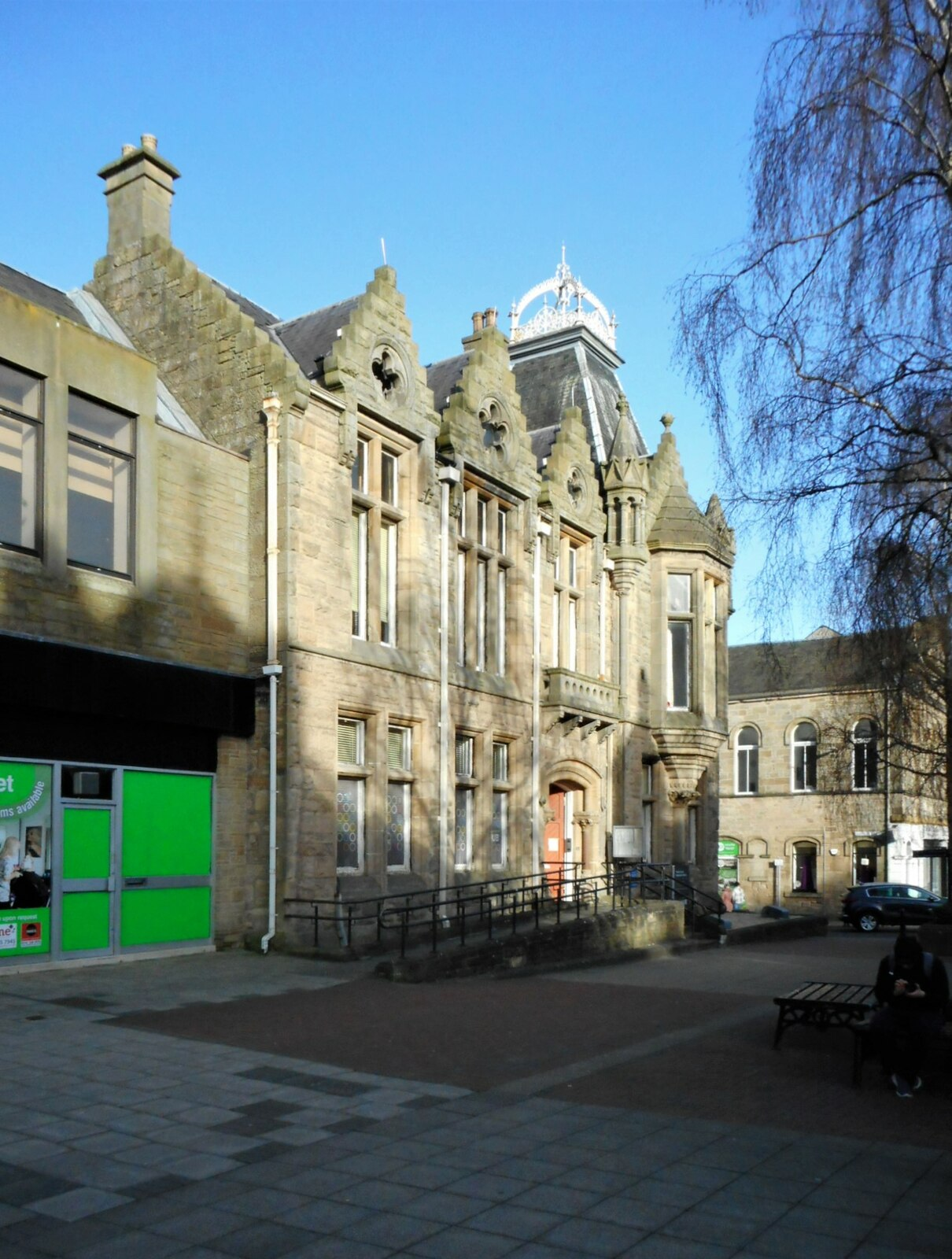
- The building in 2023

- Shown in Falkirk
- 56.0008°N 3.7863°W
- Location: Newmarket Street, Falkirk

History
- Built: 1879

Site notes
- Architect: William Black
- Architectural style: Scottish baronial style

Listed Building – Category C(S)
- Official name: Social Work Department (Former Municipal Buildings) Newmarket Street
- Designated: 23 April 1979
- Reference no.: LB31207

The Old Municipal Buildings is a municipal structure on Newmarket Street in Falkirk in Scotland. The building, which accommodates the local register office, is a Category C listed building.

== History ==
The first municipal building in the town was the Falkirk Steeple which was completed in 1814. After the area became a police burgh in 1859, the burgh council decided to procure dedicated municipal buildings. The site they selected was on the north side of Newmarket Street.

The new building was designed by William Black in the Scottish baronial style, built in rubble masonry and was completed in 1879. The design involved an asymmetrical main frontage of four bays facing onto Newmarket Street. The first two bays were fenestrated by mullioned and transomed windows and surmounted by gables, the left gable containing a quatrefoil and the right gable containing a cinquefoil. The third bay featured a segmental headed doorway flanked by colonettes supporting a hood mould; there was a mullioned and transomed window facing onto a balcony on the first floor, and a gable containing a quatrefoil above. The right-hand bay was fenestrated by a pair of transomed windows on the ground floor and by an oriel window on the first floor with a gable above. There was a small bartizan on the right-hand corner and, at roof level, there was a pyramid-shaped roof with brattishing. Internally, the principal room was the council chamber.

A memorial by the sculptor William Grant Stevenson, in the form of a Highlander protecting his fallen comrade, mounted on a pedestal and intended to commemorate local service personnel who had died in the Second Boer War, was erected in front of the municipal buildings in 1905. King George V, accompanied by Queen Mary and Princess Mary visited the municipal buildings in July 1914, King George VI, accompanied by Queen Elizabeth, attended the municipal buildings in June 1946, and Queen Elizabeth II, accompanied by the Duke of Edinburgh, met with civic leaders at the municipal buildings in July 1955.

The building ceased to be the local seat of government when modern municipal buildings were built on West Bridge Street in 1965. The old municipal buildings were then re-purposed to accommodate the social work department of the local council, before being converted to serve as the local registration office, with the old council chamber becoming the marriage room.

== See also ==
- List of listed buildings in Falkirk, Falkirk
