= Falkirk Sheriff Court =

Municipal building in Falkirk, Scotland

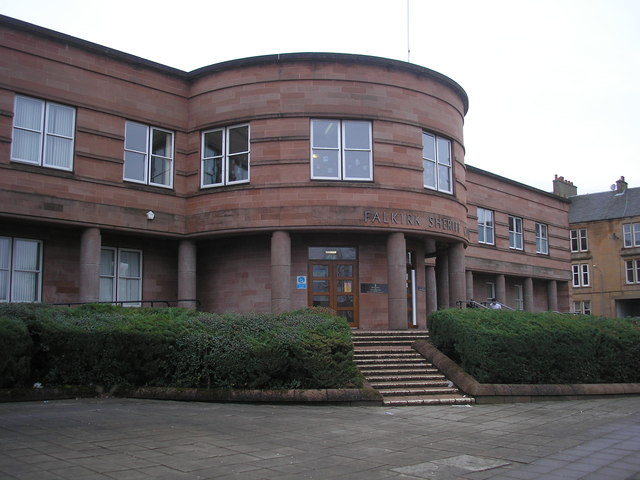
- The building in 2011

- Shown in Falkirk
- 56.0036°N 3.8152°W
- Location: Main Street, Camelon, Falkirk

History
- Built: 1990

Site notes
- Architect: RMJM
- Architectural style: Postmodern style

Falkirk Sheriff Court is a judicial structure on Main Street in Camelon, a district of Falkirk in Scotland. It operates within the sheriffdom of Tayside, Central and Fife.

== History ==
Until the late 1980s, hearings took place at the Old Sheriff Court in Hope Street. However, as the number of court cases in Falkirk grew, it became necessary to commission a modern courthouse for criminal matters. The site the court officials selected was open land on the south side of Main Street in Camelon.

The new building was designed by RMJM in the Postmodern style, built in red sandstone at a cost of £6.3 million, and was completed in 1990. The design involved a symmetrical main frontage of 11 bays facing onto Main Street. The central bay was formed by a semi-circular section which was projected forward. It featured a short flight of steps leading up to three doorways which were recessed behind a semi-circular colonnade supporting an entablature. There were a series of casement windows on the first floor of the section. The wings of five bays each were laid out in a similar style with casement windows recessed behind colonnades on the ground floor and another series of casement windows on the first floor. Internally, the building was laid out to accommodate four courtrooms.

== Operations ==
The court deals with both criminal and civil cases. There are currently two sheriffs in post at Falkirk Sheriff Court. They sit alone in civil cases and are assisted by a jury of fifteen members selected from the electoral roll in some criminal cases (cases involving solemn proceedings only). The Sheriff Principal is Gillian Wade.
