= Breath-figure self-assembly =

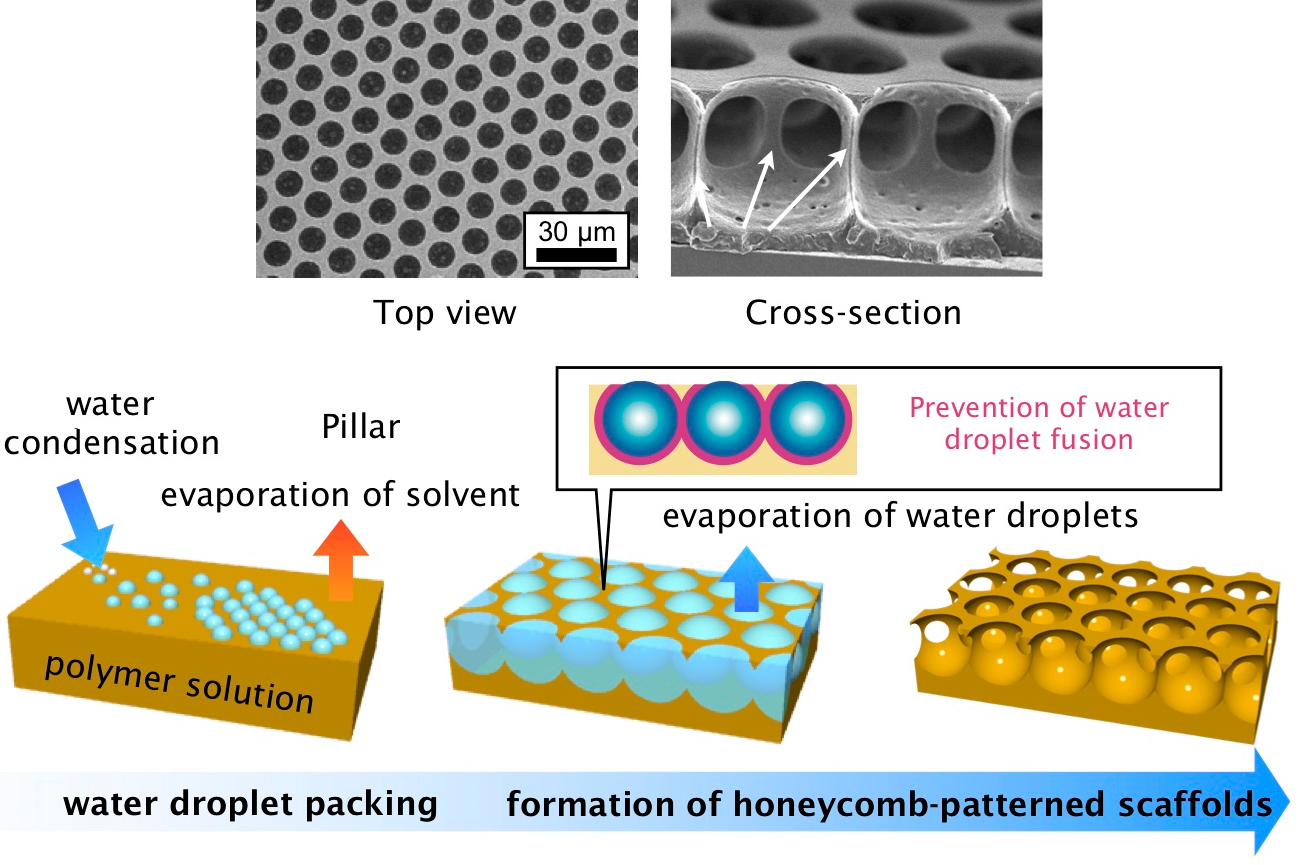
Schematic (bottom) and electron micrographs (top) of the growth of a honeycomb polystyrene film by breath-figure self-assembly.

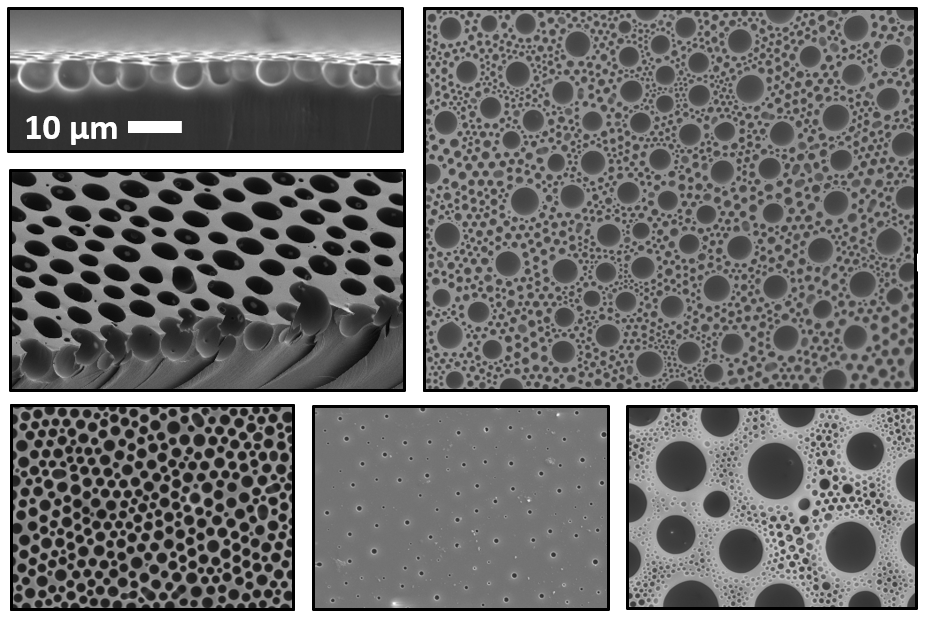
SEM images of varied patterns created through an adapted breath figure approach.

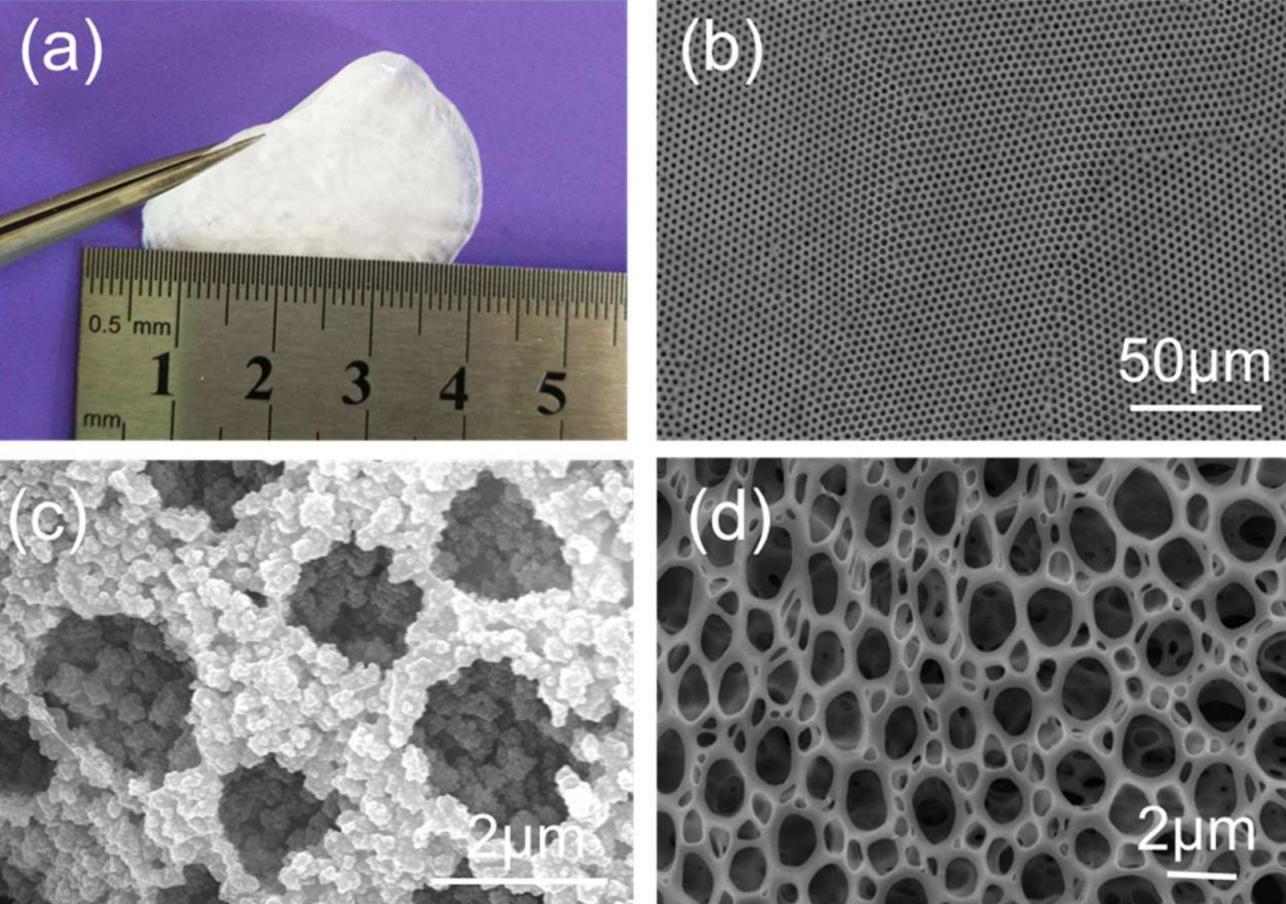
A water filter membrane prepared by breath-figure self-assembly, viewed at different synthesis steps and magnifications. The membrane material is a mixture of poly(phenylene oxide) and silica nanoparticles.

Breath-figure self-assembly is the self-assembly process of the formation of honeycomb micro-scaled polymer patterns by the condensation of water droplets. "Breath-figure" refers to the fog that forms when water vapor contacts a cold surface. In the modern era systematic study of the process of breath-figures water condensation was carried out by Aitken and Rayleigh, among others. Half a century later the interest in the breath-figure formation was revived in a view of study of atmospheric processes, and in particular the extended study of a dew formation which turned out to be a complicated physical process. The experimental and theoretical study of dew formation has been carried out by Beysens. Thermodynamic and kinetic aspects of dew formation, which are crucial for understanding of formation of breath-figures inspired polymer patterns will be addressed further in detail.

Breakthrough in the application of the breath-figures patterns was achieved in 1994–1995 when Widawski, François and Pitois reported manufacturing of polymer films with a self-organized, micro-scaled, honeycomb morphology using the breath-figures condensation process. The reported process was based on the rapidly evaporated polymer solutions exerted to humidity. The introduction to experimental techniques involved in manufacturing of micropatterned surfaces is supplied in reference 1; image representing typical breath-figures-inspired honeycomb pattern is shown in Figure 1.

The main physical processes involved in the process are: 1) evaporation of the polymer solution; 2) nucleation of water droplets; 3) condensation of water droplets; 4) growth of droplets; 5) evaporation of water; 6) solidification of polymer giving rise to the eventual micro-porous pattern. This experimental technique allows obtaining well-ordered, hierarchical, honeycomb surface patterns. A variety of experimental techniques were successfully exploited for the formation of breath-figures self-assembly induced patterns including drop-casting, dip-coating and spin-coating. Adapted techniques to achieve varied pattern morphologies and hierarchical designs have also been developed. The characteristic dimension of pores is usually close to 1 μm, whereas the characteristic lateral dimension of the large-scale patterns is ca. 10–50 μm.

== See also ==
- Self-assembly
- Marangoni effect
- Droplet cluster
