= Viking bus station =

Bus station in the Shetland Islands, Scotland

Viking Bus Station
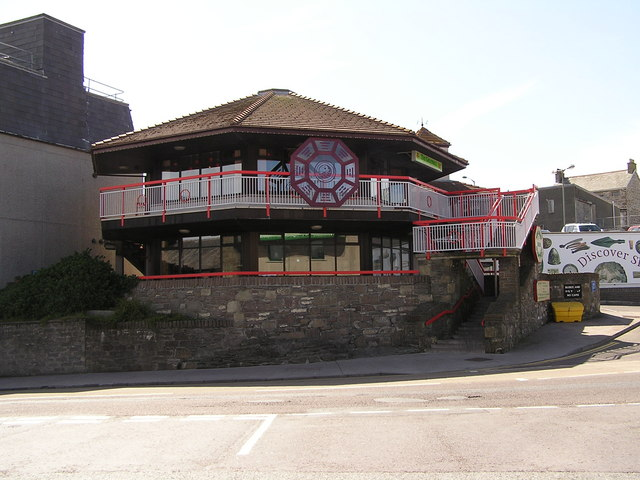
- The bus station in 2007

General information
- Location: Lerwick; Scotland
- Coordinates: 60°9′25.52″N 1°8′45.4″W
Location

Viking Bus Station is a bus station in Lerwick, Shetland, Scotland. The station is used both by passengers and for freight, which is transported by bus.

== History ==
While the site had been in use as a bus station for some time prior, plans for a new station building were put forward by the council in 1985. Construction work began in March 1990, with the work carried out by Shetland-based construction firm DITT. The bus station opened on 22 May 1991, representing an overall investment of approximately £900,000.

A mural was installed at the bus station in 2007 to celebrate the opening of the Shetland Museum. In 2018, it was replaced with a new spray-painted mural.

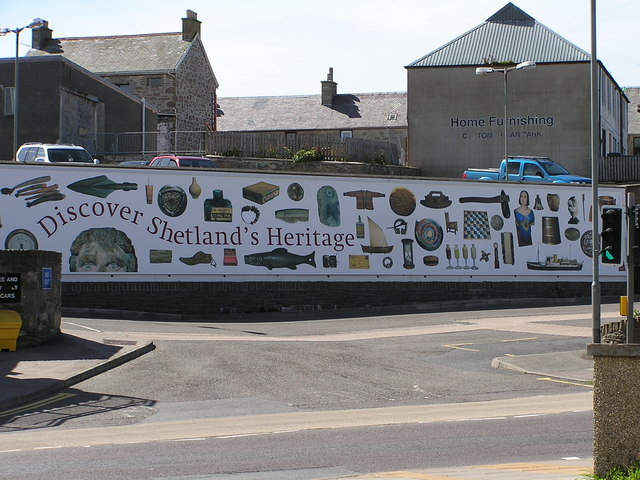
The mural in 2007

In 2013, Shetland Islands Council proposed closing the waiting room and relocating the freight operations, which it expected would save £80,000 per year. Instead, ownership of the bus station was transferred to the private sector. In 2014, ownership of the station was transferred to a couple who operate a Chinese restaurant on its upper floor. The bus station was mostly operated by John Leask & Son's bus company that was founded in 1919. They had operated the busses from Viking until 2020, when they ceased operation due to the family closing the business. The bus services they operated were then split to be run by four other separate companies. During the COVID-19 pandemic in Scotland, Viking bus station was used as the base for a vaccination shuttle bus. In 2024, Viking bus station started to operate a commercial Sunday service for the first time.

== See also ==
- List of bus stations in Scotland
