= Bob Mauchline =

Scottish footballer

Personal information
- Full name: Robert Duff Mauchline
- Date of birth: 15 December 1913
- Place of birth: Falkirk, Scotland
- Date of death: 1999 (aged 85–86)
- Position: Outside left

Senior career*
Years	Team	Apps	(Gls)
1936–1938	Heart of Midlothian		
1938–1939	Blackpool	4	(0)
1939	Barrow	14	(3)
1939–1946	Accrington Stanley	0	(0)
- * Club domestic league appearances and goals

Robert Duff Mauchline (15 December 1913 – 1999) was a Scottish footballer who played as an outside left for Heart of Midlothian. He later played for English clubs Blackpool, Barrow and Accrington Stanley in the English Football League.
