= Kilmarnock bus station =

Bus station in Kilmarnock, Scotland

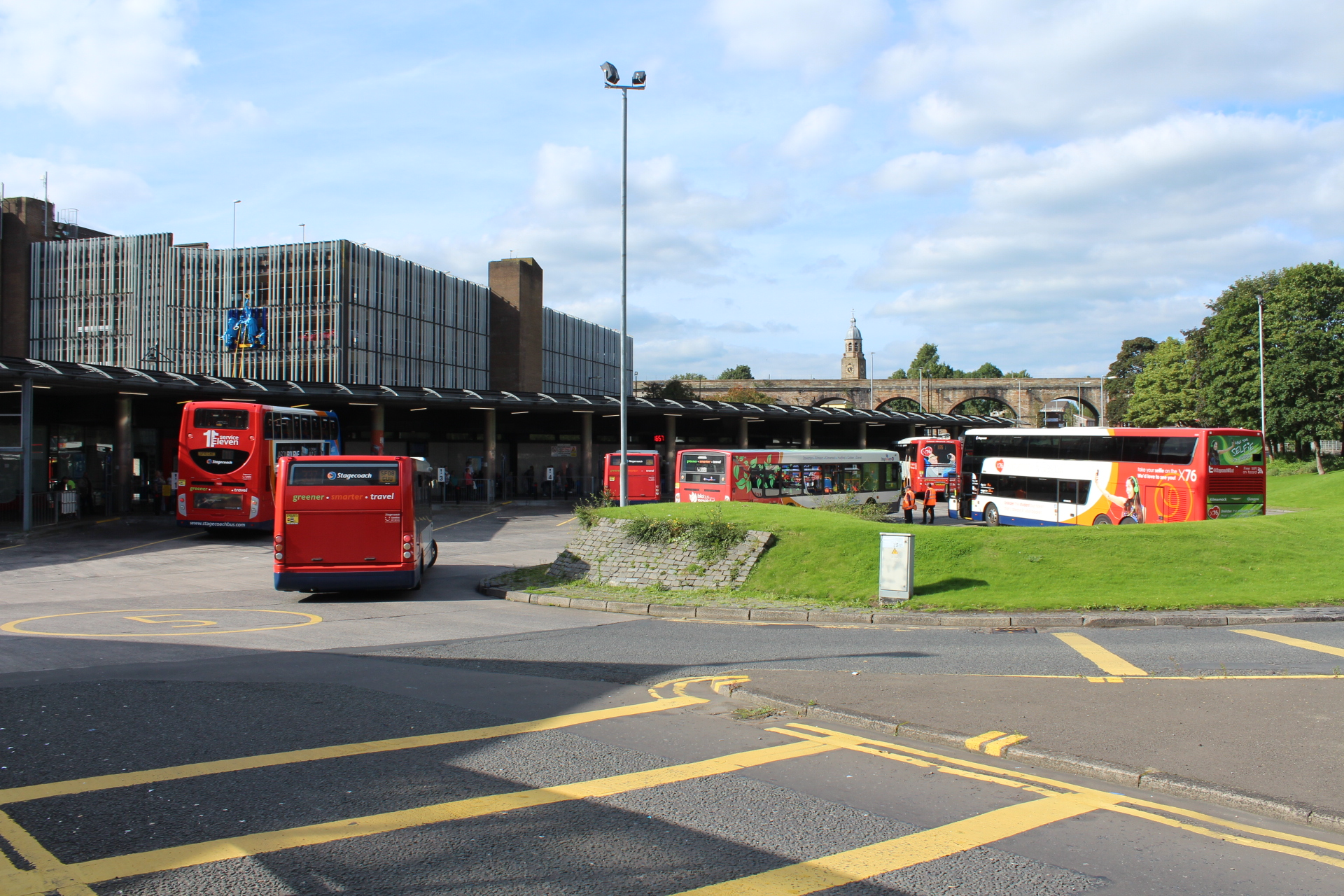
- The bus station in 2016

General information
- Location: Kilmarnock, Scotland
- Coordinates: 55°36′38.14″N 4°29′41.77″W
- Bus stands: 11
- Bus operators: Stagecoach West Scotland; Shuttle Buses

History
- Opened: 1974
Location

Kilmarnock bus station is a bus station in Kilmarnock, Scotland.

== History ==
The bus station was built in 1974 and replaced a bus station in Portland Street.

A project to redevelop the bus station started in November 2019 and was initially expected to be completed by spring 2020. However, the project was delayed after the contractor went bankrupt in March 2020.

Seating at the bus station was removed on 2 June 2020. It was subsequently claimed that this was to reduce the spread of COVID-19. In February 2021, new rests for passengers to lean on were installed, replacing the traditional seating. The new seating faced criticism due to accessibility concerns and in September 2021, council officers stated that it would be replaced.

In September 2022, Stagecoach West Scotland stated that it would no longer serve the bus station after 6pm due to anti-social behaviour.

== Services (2026) ==
- 1 - Priestland via Irvine Valley

Runs between the Bus Station, Kilmarnock, and Loudoun Avenue, Priestland, serving Irvine Valley.

- 1A - Crosshouse Hospital

Operates from Bus Station, Kilmarnock, to Drumleyhill Drive. Hurlford.

- 1B - Galston via Kilmarnock

Connects Kilmarnock to Galston, offering additional travel options for Irvine Valley residents.

- 2 - Hurlford

Travels from Bus Station, Kilmarnock, to Hurlford.

- 3 - Shortlees / Onthank

Covers a circular route from Amlaird Road, Onthank, through Kilmarnock to Sunnyside Road Terminus/Loreny Drive, Shortlees.

- 4 - Ayr via Prestwick Airport / Glasgow via Newton Mearns & Pollokshaws

Long-distance service connecting Buchanan Bus Station, Glasgow, to Ayr.

- 5 - New Farm Loch

Operates between Bus Station, Kilmarnock, and Kennedy Drive, New Farm Loch.

- 6 - Belfield via ASDA / New Farm Loch

Links New Farm Loch and Belfield through key stops, including ASDA.

7 - Belfield / New Farm Loch

Provides a complementary service to 6, connecting New Farm Loch and Belfield.

- 9 - Stewarton via Kilmaurs

Connects Kilmarnock to Stewarton with stops in Kilmaurs for local commuters.

- 10 - Troon via Dundonald, Loans & Barassie

Runs from Bus Station, Kilmarnock, to Lang Road, Barassie, and Troon, passing through Dundonald and Loans.

- 110 - Troon via Crosshouse Hospital, Dundonald & Barassie (Sunday only)
- 11 - Ardrossan via Crosshouse Hospital, Irvine, Kilwinning & Saltcoats

Travels from Chapelhill Mount, Ardrossan, to Bus Station, Kilmarnock, covering several North Ayrshire towns and villages.

- 50 - Cumnock via Auchinleck

Operates between Tanyard Bus Stance, Cumnock, and Bus Station, Kilmarnock.

- 76 - New Cumnock / Cumnock to Kilmarnock

Connects New Cumnock and Tanyard Bus Stance, Cumnock, to Bus Station, Kilmarnock.

- X76 - Glasgow Express via Fenwick

High-speed service from Buchanan Bus Station, Glasgow, to Bus Station, Kilmarnock, via Fenwick.

- X76B - Muirkirk via Mauchline, Auchinleck and Cumnock.

A dedicated express route from Bus Station, Kilmarnock, to Tanyard, Cumnock, via Mauchline.

- X71 - Priestland to Glasgow via Kilmarnock

(once per day in each direction)

- X77K - Ayr to Glasgow

Runs every evening via Kilmarnock.

- X78 - Troon to Glasgow via Kilmarnock

(once per day in each direction)

- X79 - Irvine (Castlepark) to Glasgow via Kilmarnock

(once per day in each direction)

- 337 - Beith via Crosshouse Hospital, Knockentiber, Kilmaurs, Stewarton & Dunlop

Covers multiple key towns, ensuring accessibility between Kilmarnock and Beith through rural Ayrshire communities. Service operated by Shuttle Buses.

== See also ==
- List of bus stations in Scotland
