= John Meechan =

Scottish footballer

Personal information
- Full name: John Stewart Meechan
- Date of birth: 1910
- Place of birth: Falkirk, Scotland
- Date of death: 1962 (aged 51–52)
- Position: Centre forward

Senior career*
Years	Team	Apps	(Gls)
- Maryhill Hibernian
- St Mirren
1933–1934	Burnley	2	(0)
- * Club domestic league appearances and goals

John Stewart Meechan (1910–1962) was a Scottish professional footballer who played as a centre forward. He played in the Scottish Football League with St Mirren, and Falkirk F.C. He also made two appearances in the English Football League for Burnley in the 1933–34 season.
