= John Aitken (meteorologist) =

Scottish meteorologist, physicist and marine engineer (1839–1919)

John Aitken FRS FRSE
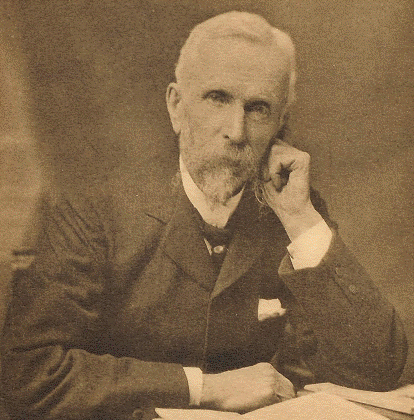
- Born: 18 September 1839; Falkirk, Stirlingshire, Scotland
- Died: 14 November 1919 (aged 80); Ardenlea, Falkirk, Stirlingshire, Scotland
- Education: Glasgow University
- Known for: cloud physics aerosol
- Awards: Keith Prize 1883-5; Gunning Victoria Jubilee Prize 1893-6; Royal Medal (1917)
- Scientific career
- Fields: meteorology and physics
- Workplaces: Practised meteorology from his home at Darroch, Falkirk.

Signature
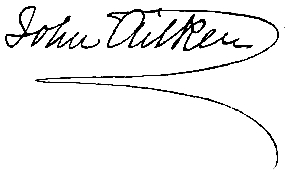

John Aitken, FRS, FRSE LLD (18 September 1839 – 14 November 1919) was a Scottish meteorologist, physicist and marine engineer. He was one of the founders of cloud physics and aerosol science, who built the first apparatus to measure the number of dust and fog particles in the atmosphere, a koniscope.

== Life ==
Aitken was born at Darroch House in Falkirk on 18 September 1839, one of eight children of Henry Aitken of Darroch, a Falkirk lawyer in the firm of Russell & Aitken.

John was educated at Falkirk Grammar School and studied marine engineering at Glasgow University, undertaking his engineer training with Messrs Napier & Sons, the Glasgow shipbuilder.

He returned to his home town of Falkirk, where he carried out his various experiments. In 1875 he was elected a Fellow of the Royal Society of Edinburgh. His proposers were William Thomson, Lord Kelvin, Edward Sang, James Thomson Bottomley and Allen Thomson.

He was elected a Fellow of the Royal Society of London in 1889 and was awarded the Royal Medal in 1917. He also received the Keith Medal (1883-1885) and Gunning Victoria Jubilee Prize (1893-6) from the Royal Society of Edinburgh. In April 1902 he received an honorary doctorate (LL.D.) from the University of Glasgow.

He died at "Ardenlea", his villa on Redding Road in Falkirk 13 November 1919.

== Work ==
He carried out experiments on atmospheric dust in relation to the formation of clouds and mists (1882), on the formation of dew (1885) and on the laws of cyclones (1891). His instrument for counting the dust particles in the air has been used in principle by many later workers. He also invented new forms of thermometer screens which aided the development of meteorology.

One of his experiments conducted with a self-designed apparatus provided the first evidence of new particle formation in the atmosphere. This work was documented in an article titled "On some nuclei of cloudy condensation", in the 39th volume of the Transactions of the Royal Society of Edinburgh published in 1898.

John Aitken was the author of a number of important pioneering discoveries "On Dust, Fogs and Clouds" (the title of an 1880 article he penned). As early as 1874, Aitken had concluded that when water vapour in the atmosphere condenses, it must condense on some solid particle, and thus, without the presence of dust and other aerosol particles in the air, there would be no formation of fog, clouds, or rain (that was however experimentally disproven by C. T. R. Wilson in 1895, who later discovered that ions created by cosmic rays also work). In 1884, he concluded that the brilliant colours often seen in the sunset are due to the refraction of light by dust particles in the upper atmosphere.

Today, his name is given by atmospheric scientists to the smallest atmospheric aerosol particles (Aitken nuclei), those with a radius less than 0.1 micrometres. This size range include the newly nucleated particles whose existence Aitken demonstrated.

Cargill Gilston Knott assembled and edited Aitken's works for the Royal Society of Edinburgh, and contributed an introductory Memoir:

== Bibliography of Aitken's Papers ==
1. Aitken, J. 1872. Melting and regelation of ice. Nature 6:396.
2. Aitken, J. 1873. Glacier motion. Nature 7(172):287–288.
3. Aitken, J. 1875. On boiling, condensing, freezing, and melting. Transactions of the Royal Scottish Society of Arts (1874–1875) 9:240–287.
4. Aitken, J. 1875. Experiments illustrating rigidity produced by centrifugal force. Proceedings of the Royal Society of Edinburgh (1875–1876) 9(94):73–78.
5. Aitken, J. 1876. Experiments illustrating rigidity produced by centrifugal force. Proceedings of the Royal Philosophical Society of Glasgow (1875–1876) 10(1):99–106.
6. Aitken, J. 1878. Experiments illustrating rigidity produced by centrifugal force. The London, Edinburgh, and Dublin Philosophical Magazine and Journal of Science, Fifth series, 5(29):81–105.
7. Aitken, J. 1876–77. On ocean circulation. Proceedings of the Royal Society of Edinburgh (1876–1877) 9(98):394–400.
8. Aitken, J. 1880. On a new variety of ocular spectrum. Proceedings of the Royal Society of Edinburgh (1878–1879) 10(104):40–44.
9. Aitken, J. 1880. On the distribution of temperature under the ice in frozen lakes. Proceedings of the Royal Society of Edinburgh (1878–1879) 10(104):409–415.
10. Aitken, J. 1880. On dust, fogs, and clouds. Proceedings of the Royal Society of Edinburgh (1880–1881) 11(108):14–18; 122–126.
11. Aitken, J. 1880. On dust, fogs, and clouds. Nature 23(583):195–197.
12. Aitken, J. 1881. Dust and fogs. Nature 23(588):311–312.
13. Aitken, J. 1881. Dust, fogs, and clouds. Nature 23(591):384–385.
14. Aitken, J. 1881. On dust, fogs, and clouds. Van Nostrand's Engineering Magazine 24(148):308–310.
15. Aitken, J. 1882. On the colour of the Mediterranean and other waters. Proceedings of the Royal Society of Edinburgh (1881–1882) 11:472–483.
16. Aitken, J. 1882–1883. On the effect of oil on a stormy sea. Proceedings of the Royal Society of Edinburgh (1882–1883) 12:56–75.
17. Aitken, J. 1883. On dust, fogs, and clouds. Transactions of the Royal Society of Edinburgh 30(1):337–368.
18. Aitken, J. 1883–84. The remarkable sunsets. Proceedings of the Royal Society of Edinburgh 12:448–450, 647-660. (See 1883 eruption of Krakatoa.)
19. Aitken, J. 1884. On the formation of small clear spaces in dusty air. Transactions of the Royal Society of Edinburgh (1883–1884) 32:239–272.
20. Aitken, J. 1884. Second note on the remarkable sunsets. Proceedings of the Royal Society of Edinburgh (1883–1884) 12:123–133.
21. Aitken, J. 1885. Chromomictors. Proceedings of the Royal Society of Edinburgh (1884–1885) 13:122–130.
22. Aitken, J. 1885. On dew. Proceedings of the Royal Society of Edinburgh (1885–1886) 13(121):446–450.
23. Aitken, J. 1885. On thermometer screens. Proceedings of the Royal Society of Edinburgh (1885–1886) 13:632–642.
24. Aitken, J. 1886. On dew. The London, Edinburgh, and Dublin Philosophical Magazine and Journal of Science, Fifth Series, 22(135):206–212; (137):363–368.
25. Aitken, J. 1887. Note on hoar-frost. Proceedings of the Royal Society of Edinburgh 14(2):121–125.
26. Aitken, J. 1888. On the number of dust particles in the atmosphere. Transactions of the Royal Society of Edinburgh 35(1):1–19.
27. Aitken, J. 1889. Dust particles in the atmosphere at Ben Nevis Observatory. Nature 40:350–351.
28. Aitken, J. 1889. On improvements in the apparatus for counting the dust particles in the atmosphere. Proceedings of the Royal Society of Edinburgh 16(129):134–172.
29. Aitken, J. 1890. On the number of dust particles in the atmosphere of certain places in Great Britain and on the continent, with remarks on the relation between the amount of dust and meteorological phenomena. Proceedings of the Royal Society of Edinburgh (1889–1890) 17(130):193–254.
30. Aitken, J. 1890. On the number of dust particles in the atmosphere of certain places in Great Britain and on the continent, with remarks on the relation between the amount of dust and meteorological phenomena. Nature 41(1061):394–396.
31. Aitken, J. 1891. On a simple pocket dust-counter. Proceedings of the Royal Society of Edinburgh (1890–1891) 18(February):39–52.
32. Aitken, J. 1891. On a method of observing and counting the number of water particles in a fog. Proceedings of the Royal Society of Edinburgh (1890–1891) 18:259–262.
33. Aitken, J. 1891. On the solid and liquid particles in clouds. Transactions of the Royal Society of Edinburgh 36:313–319.
34. Aitken, J. 1892. On the number of dust particles in the atmosphere of certain places in Great Britain and on the continent, with remarks on the relation between the amount of dust and meteorological phenomena. Transactions of the Royal Society of Edinburgh 37(3):17–49; (28):621–693.
35. Aitken, J. 1892. On some phenomena connected with cloudy condensation. Proceedings of the Royal Society of London 51(312):408–439.
36. Aitken, J. 1892–95. On some observations made without a dust counter on the hazing effect of atmospheric dust. Proceedings of the Royal Society of Edinburgh 20:76–93.
37. Aitken, J. 1893. Particles in fogs and clouds. Transactions of the Royal Society of Edinburgh 37(20):413–425.
38. Aitken, J. 1893. Breath figures. Proceedings of the Royal Society of Edinburgh 20:94–97.
39. Aitken, J. 1894. Dust and meteorological phenomena. Nature 49(1275):544–546.
40. Aitken, J. 1894. Phenomena connected with cloudy condensation. Annual Report of the Board of Regents of the Smithsonian Institution, July 1893, pp. 201–230.
41. Aitken, J. 1895. On the number of dust particles in the atmosphere of certain places in Great Britain and on the continent, with remarks on the relation between the amount of dust and meteorological phenomena. Transactions of the Royal Society of Edinburgh 37(3):17–49; (28):621–693.
42. Aitken, J. 1896. Observations of atmospheric dust. In: Fassig, O. (ed), United States Department of Agriculture, Weather Bureau Bulletin 11, Part III, pp. 734–754.
43. Aitken, J. 1898. On some nuclei of cloudy condensation. Transactions of the Royal Society of Edinburgh 39(3):15–25.
44. Aitken, J. 1902. Report on atmospheric dust. Transactions of the Royal Society of Edinburgh 42(2):479–489.
45. Aitken, J. 1903. On the formation of definitive figures by the deposition of dust. Philosophical Transactions of the Royal Society of London A 201:551–558.
46. Aitken, J. 1905. Evaporation of musk and other odorous substances. Proceedings of the Royal Society of Edinburgh 25(10):894–902.
47. Aitken, J. 1912. The sun as a fog producer. Proceedings of the Royal Society of Edinburgh (1911–1912) 32:183–215.

== See also ==
- Breath-figure self-assembly
