= Falkirk bus station =

Former bus station in Falkirk, Scotland

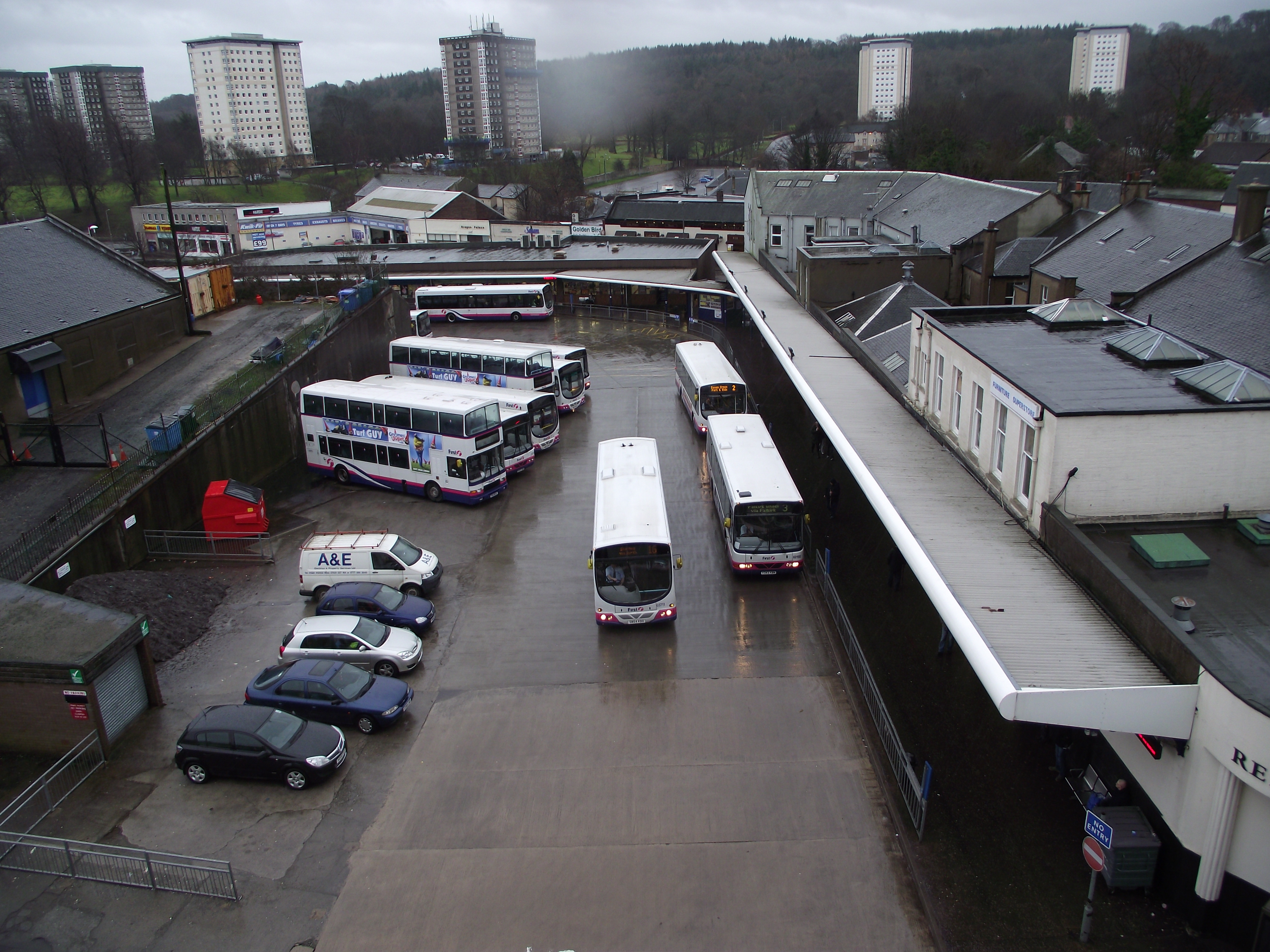

General information
- Location: Falkirk; Scotland
- Coordinates: 55.99888°N 3.77946°W

History
- Opened: 1930s
- Closed: 19 August 2018
Location

Falkirk bus station is a disused bus station situated in Falkirk, Scotland. It is privately owned.

== History ==
The station was built in the 1930s for W. Alexander & Sons services.

In June 2018, First Scotland East, the sole operator at the station, carried out consultations for their proposal to close the station. From 20 August, the firm diverted all its services to call at nearby Newmarket Street instead of the bus station. The closure of the bus station has been criticised due to its alleged impact on elderly and disabled people, and the resulting loss of income for local businesses due to decreased footfall. It has been stated that the loss of dedicated stances for each service has made it more difficult for blind and partially sighted people to find their bus.

== Services ==
Former services included a link to Forth Valley Royal Hospital at a frequency of up to every 10 minutes.

== See also ==
- List of bus stations in Scotland
