= Grangemouth High School =

School in Falkirk, Scotland

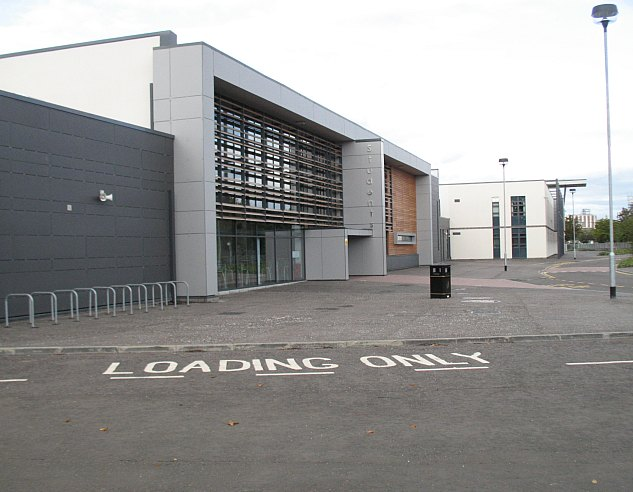
Grangemouth High School

Grangemouth High School is a mixed non-denominational secondary school in Falkirk, Scotland.

== History ==
The original Grangemouth High School was set up in 1908 and built in 1909. The present school building was built between 2006 and 2007 at a cost of £17.5 million.

In 2008, a teacher was suspended following an incident with two schoolgirls.

In 2016, it was reported that the school would have a dedicated on-site police officer.

In 2026, the school was awarded bereavement charter status as a result of its work teaching pupils about death.

== Facilities ==
The school has a 20-metre swimming pool, games hall, dance studio, gym and playing fields. The school has an Additional Support Centre (ASC) for students. The school has an Active Travel Hub.
