= St Francis Xavier's Church, Falkirk =

Church building in Falkirk, Scotland, UK

The church, in 2024

St Francis Xavier's Church is a Catholic church in Falkirk, a town in Scotland.

A Catholic church was built in Falkirk in 1843, to a design by William Stirling. In 1955, it was badly damaged in a fire. The ruins were demolished, and a new church was constructed between 1958 and 1961, designed by Alexander Ritchie Conlon. Historic Environment Scotland describes it as an "unusual application of exposed concrete in church architecture". It has been category B listed since 2010.

Internal view, looking east

The church has a five-bay nave and a sanctuary with a "saw tooth" plan, and a vestry to the south of the east end. The lower part of the building is constructed of artificial rubble, with precast concrete slabs above. At the east end, there is a tall entrance block, with windows separated by tapering concrete fins with figurative sculpture by Elizabeth Dempster, and panelling with a grid design above. It has three pairs of timber doors and a large sculpture depicting Saint Francis Xavier, designed by Maxwell Allen. Inside, there are two chapels at the east end with metal gates, and a choir gallery above. There are large precast concrete arches dividing the bays of the nave, and decoration including 35 gold crosses, mosaics designed by the Casa group, decorative laminated glass panels, stained glass windows, and artwork depicting the Stations of the Cross.
