= Koniscope =

Meteorological instrument

A koniscope (or coniscope) is a scientific instrument to detect and measure content of dust particles in the atmosphere. A koniscope is also called dust counter, or Aitken dust counter, named after John Aitken who invented the first koniscope.

The koniscope is made by connecting a pump to a test tube that is walled with moist paper. The tube is held towards a light source and the pump is briefly activated. Dust particles will cling to the paper, producing a visible change in color.
