= Falkirk Steeple =

Municipal building in Falkirk, Scotland

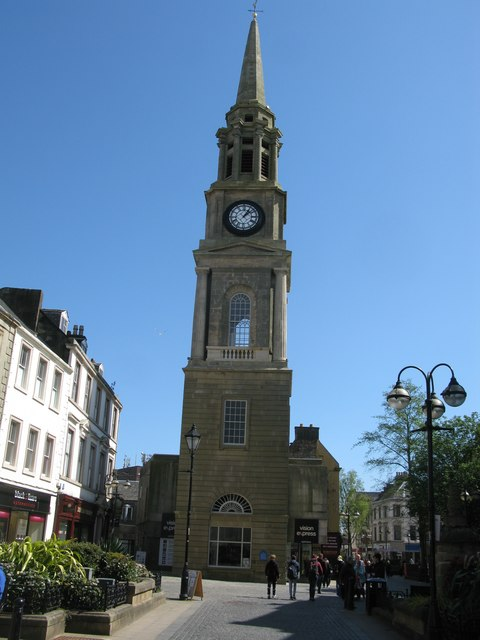
- The building in 2017

- Shown in Falkirk
- 55.9992°N 3.7840°W
- Location: High Street, Falkirk

History
- Built: 1814

Site notes
- Architect: David Hamilton
- Architectural style: Neoclassical style

Listed Building – Category A
- Official name: Falkirk Town Steeple, High Street
- Designated: 25 October 1972
- Reference no.: LB31178

The Falkirk Steeple is a municipal building on the High Street in Falkirk in Scotland. The building, which accommodates a heritage centre, is a Category A listed building.

== History ==
The first steeple in Falkirk was erected at the junction of Manor Street and Kirk Wynd in the 1580s. After it became dilapidated, it was replaced by a new building, the second steeple, which was built by a local mason, William Stevenson, and completed in 1697. The design involved a three-stage tower facing west down the High Street. There was a forestair and pedimented doorway in the first stage, small square openings in the second stage, and clock faces in the third stage, all surmounted by a double ogival roof. The bell was donated by James Livingston, 1st Earl of Callendar. It served as the local tolbooth and prison for over a century. However, after construction of an adjacent building caused the second steeple to subside, it had to be demolished in 1803.

The current building, the third steeple, was commissioned by the feudal "stentmasters " who controlled the burgh. It was designed by David Hamilton in the neoclassical style, built by a local mason, Harry Taylor, in ashlar stone quarried from Brightons at a cost of £1,460, and was completed in June 1814. The design involved a five-stage tower facing west down the High Street. There were round headed windows in the first stage, tall square headed windows in the second stage, rounded headed windows flanked by Doric order columns supporting entablatures and pediments in the third stage, clock faces flanked by pilasters in the fourth stage and an octagonal belfry formed by Ionic order columns in the fifth stage, all surmounted by an octagonal spire and a weather vane in the form of a cockerel. The tower was 140 feet (43 m) high. The bell, which was recovered from the old steeple, was supplemented by a larger bell, cast at the Whitechapel Bell Foundry, installed in 1816. Internally, there was a shop on the ground floor, a prison officer's room on the first floor, prison cells on the second and third floors, and a meeting room on the fourth floor.

The building ceased to be used for judicial purposes after the Old Sheriff Court in Hope Street was opened in October 1868, and ceased to be used for municipal purposes after the Municipal Buildings were opened in 1879. The spire was badly damaged when it was hit by lightning in June 1927. Masonry fell on a horse and cart operated by A.G. Barr, killing the horse and injuring the driver, but the spire was repaired the following year. Falkirk F.C. first adopted a silhouette of the steeple for the club in 1970.

The ground floor shop was converted for use as a tourist information centre in 1973 and was then converted again, into a box office, selling theatre and concert tickets, in the 1980s. An extensive programme of refurbishment works was financed by National Lottery Heritage Fund, Historic Scotland and Falkirk Council and carried out by Land Engineering at a cost of £750,000 in 2016. The work involved stone and window repairs, restoring the clock faces and regilding the weather vane. The building now accommodates a heritage centre managed by the Falkirk Local History Society.

== See also ==
- List of Category A listed buildings in Falkirk
- List of listed buildings in Falkirk, Falkirk
