= Falkirk =

Town in Central Lowlands, Scotland

Coordinates: 55°59′58″N 3°47′5″W

Falkirk: Scottish Gaelic: An Eaglais Bhreac; Scots: Fawkirk
- Town and administrative centre
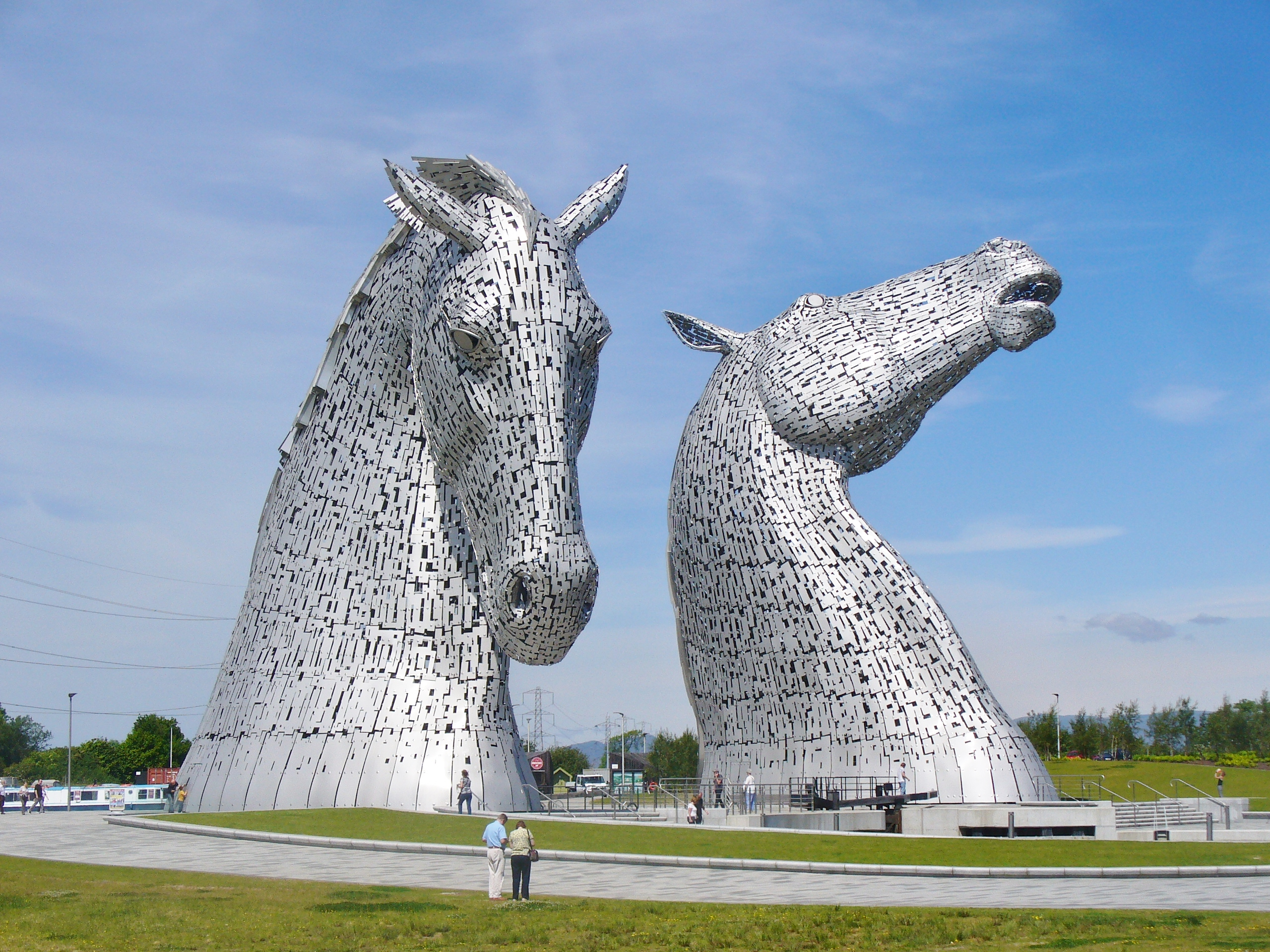
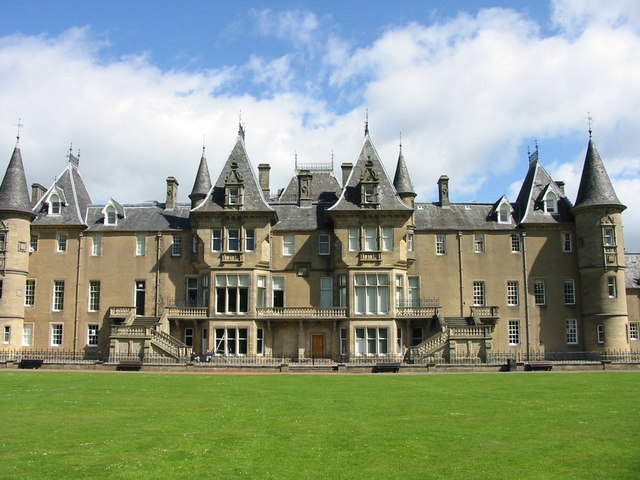
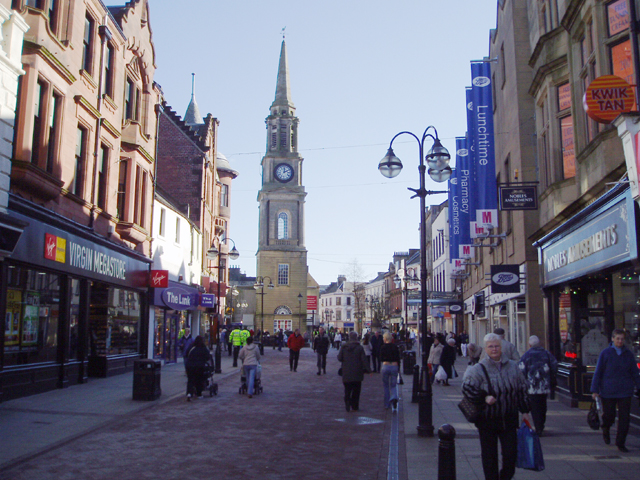
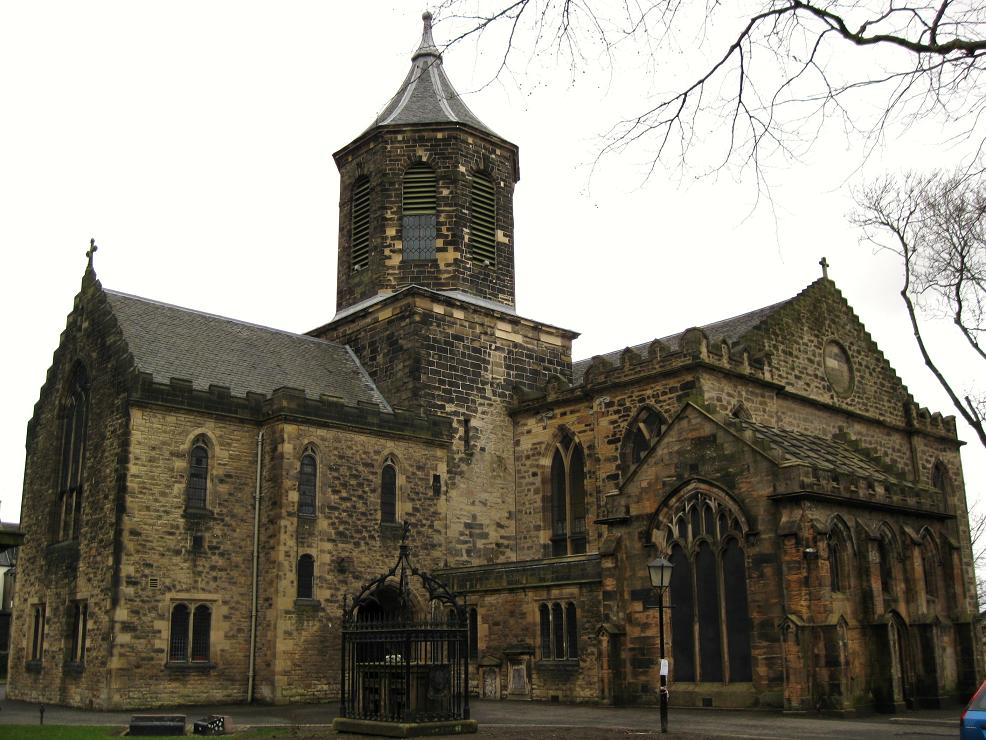
- The Kelpies Callendar House Falkirk High Street Trinity Church Falkirk Wheel

- Location within the Falkirk council area
- Area: 11 km^{2} (4.2 sq mi)
- Population: 34,627 (2022)
  - Density: 3,197/km^{2} (8,280/sq mi)
- Settled: 7th century
- Burgh Charter: 1600
- Elevation: 37 m (121 ft)
- OS grid reference: NS887801
- Civil parish: Falkirk
- Council area: Falkirk
- Lieutenancy area: Stirling and Falkirk
- Country: Scotland
- Sovereign state: United Kingdom
- Post town: FALKIRK
- Postcode district: FK1, FK2
- Dialling code: 01324
- Police: Scotland
- Fire: Scottish
- Ambulance: Scottish
- UK Parliament: Falkirk
- Scottish Parliament: Falkirk West
- Website: falkirk.gov.uk

Falkirk (/ˈfɔːlkərk/ FAWL-kurk; Scots: Fawkirk [ˈfɔːkɪrk]; Scottish Gaelic: An Eaglais Bhreac) is a town in the Central Lowlands of Scotland, historically within the county of Stirlingshire. It lies in the Forth Valley, 23 1/2 miles (38 kilometres) northwest of Edinburgh and 20 1/2 miles (33 km) northeast of Glasgow.

Falkirk had a population of 35,590 according to a mid-2020 estimate. The population of the town had decreased slightly to 34,627 in 2022, but still makes it the 20th most populous settlement in Scotland. Falkirk is the main town and administrative centre of the Falkirk council area, which has an overall population of 156,800 and inholds the nearby towns of Grangemouth, Bo'ness, Denny, Bonnybridge, Camelon, Larbert and Stenhousemuir, and the cluster of Braes villages.

The town is at the junction of the Forth and Clyde and Union canals, a location which proved key to its growth as a centre of heavy industry during the Industrial Revolution. In the eighteenth and nineteenth centuries, Falkirk was at the centre of the iron and steel industry, underpinned by the Carron Company in nearby Carron. The company made very many different items, from flat irons to kitchen ranges to fireplaces to benches to railings and many other items, but also carronades for the Royal Navy and, later, manufactured pillar boxes and phone boxes. Within the last fifty years, heavy industry has waned, and the economy relies increasingly on retail and tourism. Despite this, Falkirk remains the home of many international companies like Alexander Dennis, the largest bus production company in the United Kingdom. Falkirk has a long association with the publishing industry. The company now known as Johnston Press was established in the town in 1846. The company, now based in Edinburgh, produces the Falkirk Herald.

Attractions in and around Falkirk include the Falkirk Wheel, The Helix, The Kelpies, Callendar House and Park and remnants of the Antonine Wall. In a 2011 poll conducted by STV, it was voted as Scotland's most beautiful town.

== History ==
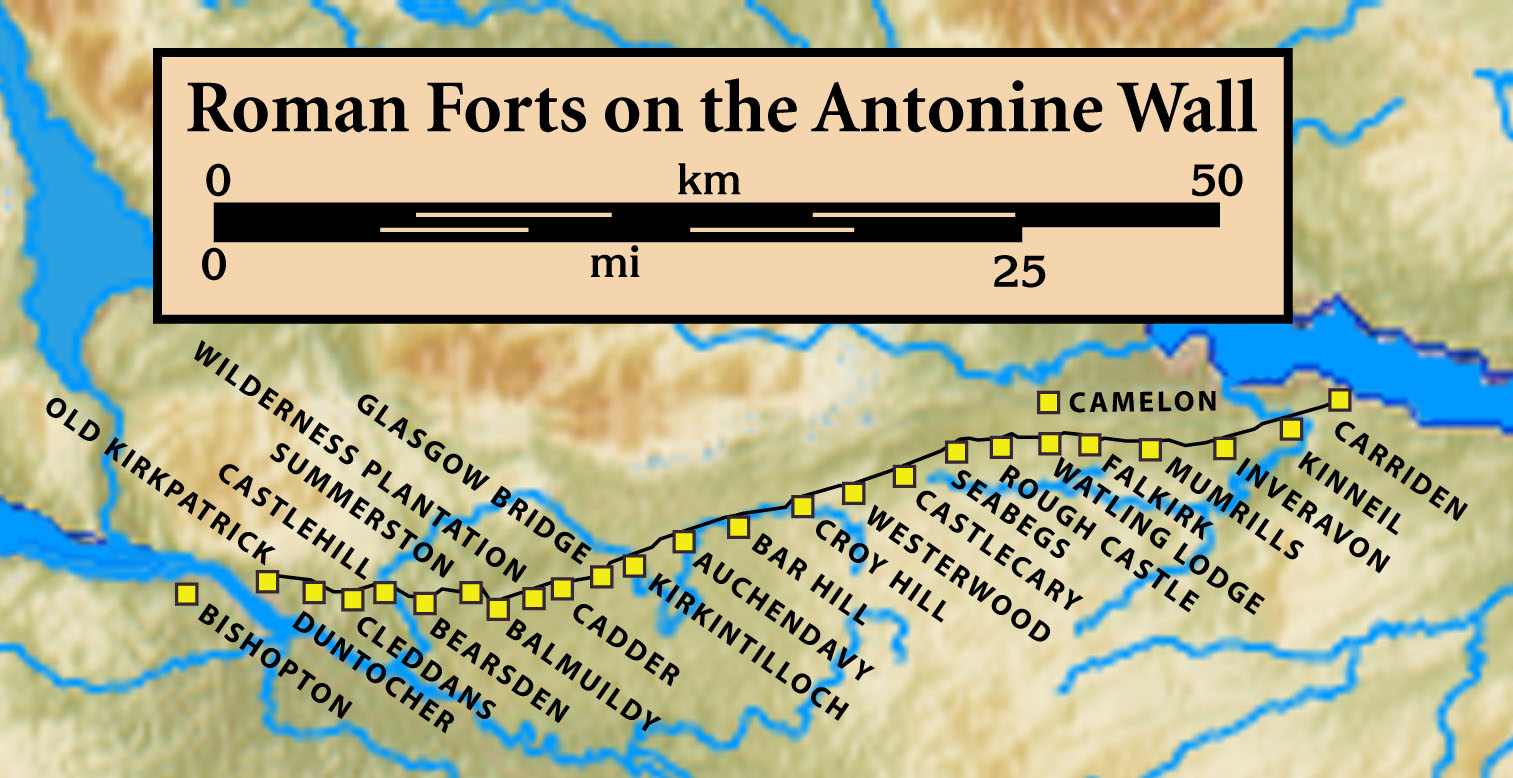
Forts and Fortlets associated with the Antonine Wall from west to east: Bishopton, Old Kilpatrick, Duntocher, Cleddans, Castlehill, Bearsden, Summerston, Balmuildy, Wilderness Plantation, Cadder, Glasgow Bridge, Kirkintilloch, Auchendavy, Bar Hill, Croy Hill, Westerwood, Castlecary, Seabegs, Rough Castle, Camelon, Watling Lodge, Falkirk, Mumrills, Inveravon, Kinneil, Carriden

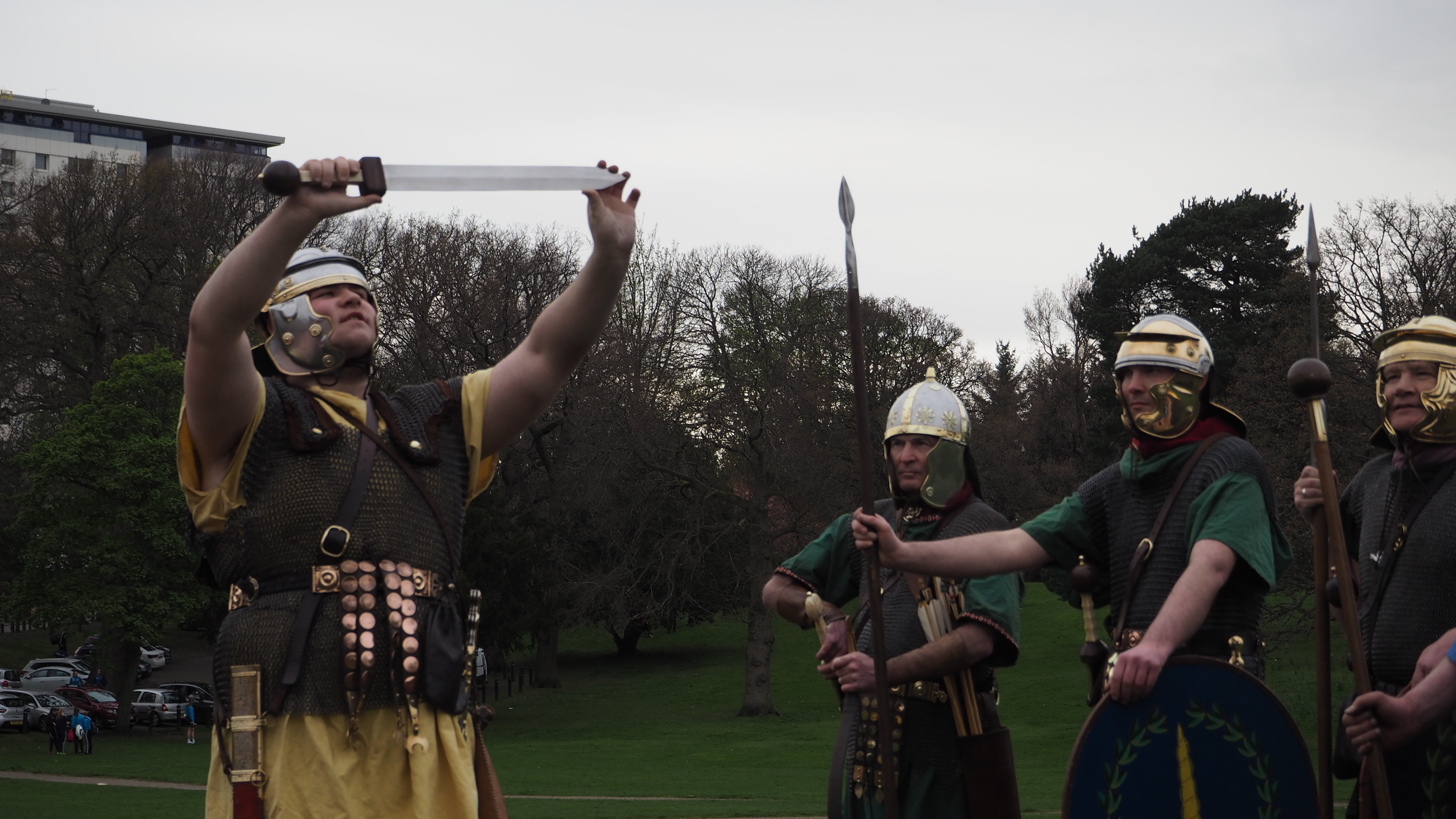
Romans (Antonine Guard Living History Society) saluting at Callendar House

=== Etymology ===
An Eaglais Bhreac is a derivative formed from the Scottish Gaelic cognate of the first recorded name Egglesbreth from the Brittonic for "speckled church", presumably referring to a church building built of many-coloured stones. The Scottish Gaelic name was calqued into Scots as Fawkirk (literally "variegated church"), then later amended to the modern English name of Falkirk. The Latin name Varia Capella also has the same meaning. Falkirk Old Parish Church stands on the site of the medieval church, which may have been founded as early as the 7th century.

=== Ancient period ===
The Antonine Wall, which stretches across the centre of Scotland, passed through the town and remnants of it can be seen at Callendar Park. Similar to Hadrian's Wall but built of turf rather than stone so less of it has survived, it marked the northern frontier of the Roman Empire between the Firth of Forth and Firth of Clyde during the AD 140s. Much of the best evidence of Roman occupation in Scotland has been found in Falkirk, including a large hoard of Roman coins and a cloth of tartan, thought to be the oldest ever recorded. A Roman fort was confirmed to be found by Geoff Bailey in the Pleasance area of Falkirk in 1991. A Roman themed park at Callendar House was awarded lottery funding to help raise awareness of the wall.

=== Contemporary period ===
In the 18th century the area was the cradle of Scotland's Industrial Revolution, becoming the earliest major centre of the iron-casting industry. James Watt cast some of the beams for his early steam engine designs at the Carron Iron Works in 1765. The area was at the forefront of canal construction when the Forth and Clyde Canal opened in 1790. The Union Canal (1822) provided a link to Edinburgh and early railway development followed in the 1830s and 1840s. The canals brought economic wealth to Falkirk and led to the town's growth. Through time, trunk roads and motorways followed the same canal corridors through the Falkirk area, linking the town with the rest of Scotland. Many companies set up work in Falkirk due to its expansion. A large brickworks was set up at this time, owned by the Howie family. During the 19th century, Falkirk became the first town in Great Britain to have a fully automated system of street lighting, designed and implemented by a local firm, Thomas Laurie & Co Ltd.

=== Battles of Falkirk ===
Two important battles have taken place at Falkirk:

- The Battle of Falkirk fought on 22 July 1298, saw the defeat of William Wallace by King Edward I of England.
- The Battle of Falkirk Muir took place on 17 January 1746, the Jacobites under Charles Edward Stuart defeated a government army commanded by Lieutenant General Henry Hawley.

== Government and politics ==
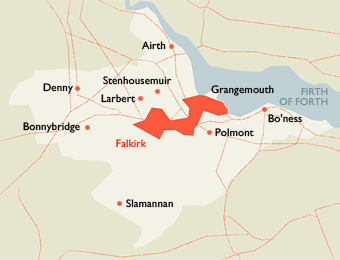
A map showing the boundaries of the Falkirk Council area, one of the 32 unitary authorities of Scotland. The town of Falkirk sits at the heart of the council area.

In terms of local government the town sits at the heart of Falkirk Council area, one of the 32 unitary authorities of Scotland formed by the Local Government etc (Scotland) Act 1994. The headquarters of the council are located in the Municipal Buildings, adjacent to the former FTH Theatre, on West Bridge Street in the centre of town. The council was the first local government in Scotland to be governed by the Labour Party, in 1921. It has been led by a Scottish National Party minority since 2017. The current Leader of the council is Cllr Cecil Meiklejohn.

Falkirk is located within the Scottish parliamentary constituency of Falkirk West which elects one Member of the Scottish Parliament (MSP) under the first past the post system. The current MSP is Michael Matheson, who won the seat at the 2007 Scottish Parliament General Election. The previous MSP, Dennis Canavan, who sat as an Independent, was elected with the largest majority in the Scottish parliament representing Falkirk's electorate's displeasure with New Labour, but stepped down in 2007 for family reasons. Canavan, who announced in an open letter to his constituents in January 2007, that he was stepping down from representative politics at the Scottish Parliament election, 2007 had been an MSP or MP for the area for over 30 years. The constituency of Falkirk West also sits in the Central Scotland Scottish Parliament electoral region which returns seven MSPs under the additional member system used to elect Members of the Scottish Parliament.

In the Parliament of the United Kingdom, the town is entirely contained within the UK parliamentary constituency of Falkirk which elects one member to the House of Commons under the plurality system. The constituency also takes in surrounding villages and is currently represented by Euan Stainbank of the Scottish Labour Party. Traditionally, Falkirk had been seen as a stronghold for the Labour Party.

Prior to Brexit in 2020 it was part of the pan-Scotland European Parliament constituency which elected six Members of the European Parliament (MEP)s using the d'Hondt method of party-list proportional representation.

== Geography ==
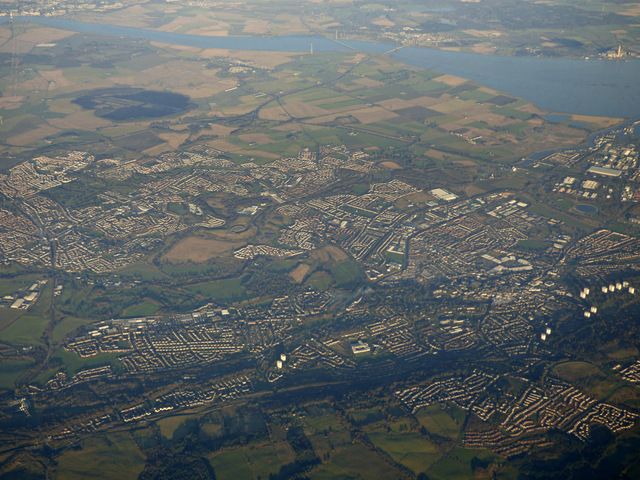
Falkirk and Stenhousemuir

Falkirk is located in an area of undulating topography between the Slamannan Plateau and the upper reaches of the Firth of Forth. The area to the north of Falkirk is part of the floodplain of the River Carron. Two tributaries of the River Carron - the East Burn and the West Burn flow through the town and form part of its natural drainage system. Falkirk sits at between 50 metres (164 ft) and 125 metres (410 ft) above sea level.

The underlying geology of the town of Falkirk is characterised by glacial deposits. Elevations above 100 metres (328 ft) are covered by a mixture of glacial till and boulder clay with low-lying areas covered by sandy soils and loams. As Falkirk is not far from the coast, post-glacial features akin to raised beaches are particularly predominant to the north of the town centre, and this gives rise to differing elevations within the town.

Unsorted glacial till gives rise to such features of glacial deposition as eskers, and drumlins which are predominant over much of the area. Such elements provide natural transport routes and it is this complex underlying geology that the town is built upon.

=== Climate ===
Like much of the rest of Scotland, Falkirk has a temperate maritime climate, which is relatively mild despite its northerly latitude. Winters are especially mild given that Moscow and Labrador lie on the same latitude, with daytime temperatures rarely falling below 0 °C (32 °F). Summer temperatures are comparatively cool, with daily upper maxima rarely exceeding 23 °C (73 °F). The proximity of the town to the sea mitigates any large variations in temperature or extremes of climate. The prevailing wind direction is from the south-west, which is associated with warm, unstable air from the Gulf Stream that gives rise to rainfall. Winds from an easterly direction are usually drier but colder. Rainfall is distributed fairly evenly throughout the year. Vigorous Atlantic depressions - sometimes called European windstorms can affect the town between October and March. The highest recorded temperature was 31.5 °C (88.7 °F) in August 2010.

Climate data for Falkirk (1991–2020)
Month	Jan	Feb	Mar	Apr	May	Jun	Jul	Aug	Sep	Oct	Nov	Dec	Year
Mean daily maximum °C (°F)	7.3 (45.1)	8.0 (46.4)	9.9 (49.8)	12.6 (54.7)	15.7 (60.3)	18.0 (64.4)	19.8 (67.6)	19.6 (67.3)	17.2 (63.0)	13.4 (56.1)	9.9 (49.8)	7.4 (45.3)	13.2 (55.8)
Mean daily minimum °C (°F)	1.2 (34.2)	1.5 (34.7)	2.5 (36.5)	4.2 (39.6)	6.6 (43.9)	9.7 (49.5)	11.3 (52.3)	11.1 (52.0)	9.1 (48.4)	5.9 (42.6)	3.2 (37.8)	1.1 (34.0)	5.6 (42.1)
Average rainfall mm (inches)	111.8 (4.40)	93.0 (3.66)	72.6 (2.86)	46.3 (1.82)	53.5 (2.11)	69.2 (2.72)	74.6 (2.94)	78.2 (3.08)	70.1 (2.76)	99.0 (3.90)	97.0 (3.82)	106.2 (4.18)	971.7 (38.26)
Average rainy days (≥ 1 mm)	15.3	12.8	12.3	9.8	11.0	11.4	12.6	12.6	12.0	14.1	15.2	14.8	154.0
Mean monthly sunshine hours	40.1	71.7	100.7	136.3	172.2	147.3	149.6	141.5	111.8	80.7	52.4	33.6	1,237.9
Source: Met Office

== Demography ==
The 2022 Scottish census identified the town as having a total resident population of 34,627. It had previously been estimated at about 35,590 in 2020, which makes the town the 20th most populous settlement in Scotland. The wider Falkirk area which includes Grangemouth, Larbert and Stenhousemuir has an overall population of 98,940 making this the 5th largest urban area after Glasgow, Edinburgh, Aberdeen and Dundee. The population of the town and surrounding area is forecast to grow over the next ten years, primarily due to net in migration from other parts of Scotland and the UK. Unemployment in the Falkirk area is low at 2.5%, below the Scottish average, but average household income and gross weekly pay are below the comparative Scottish and UK averages.

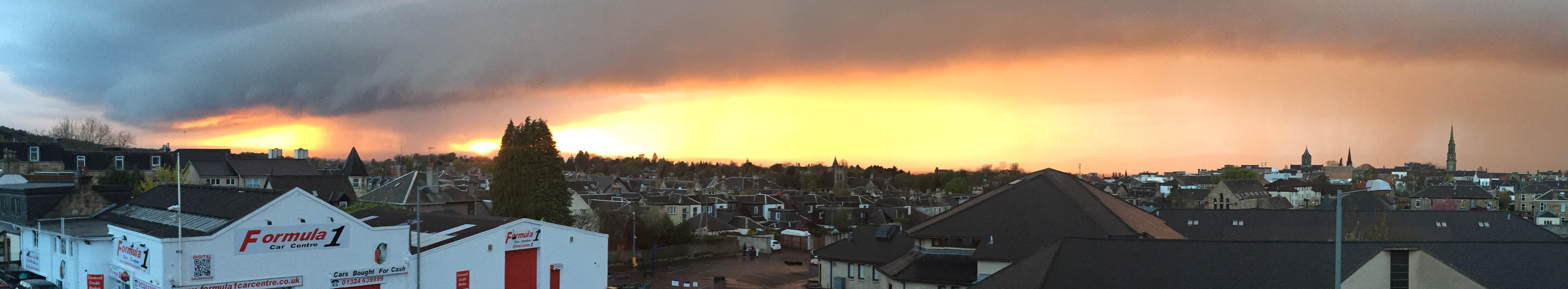
Falkirk Town skyline

== Economy ==
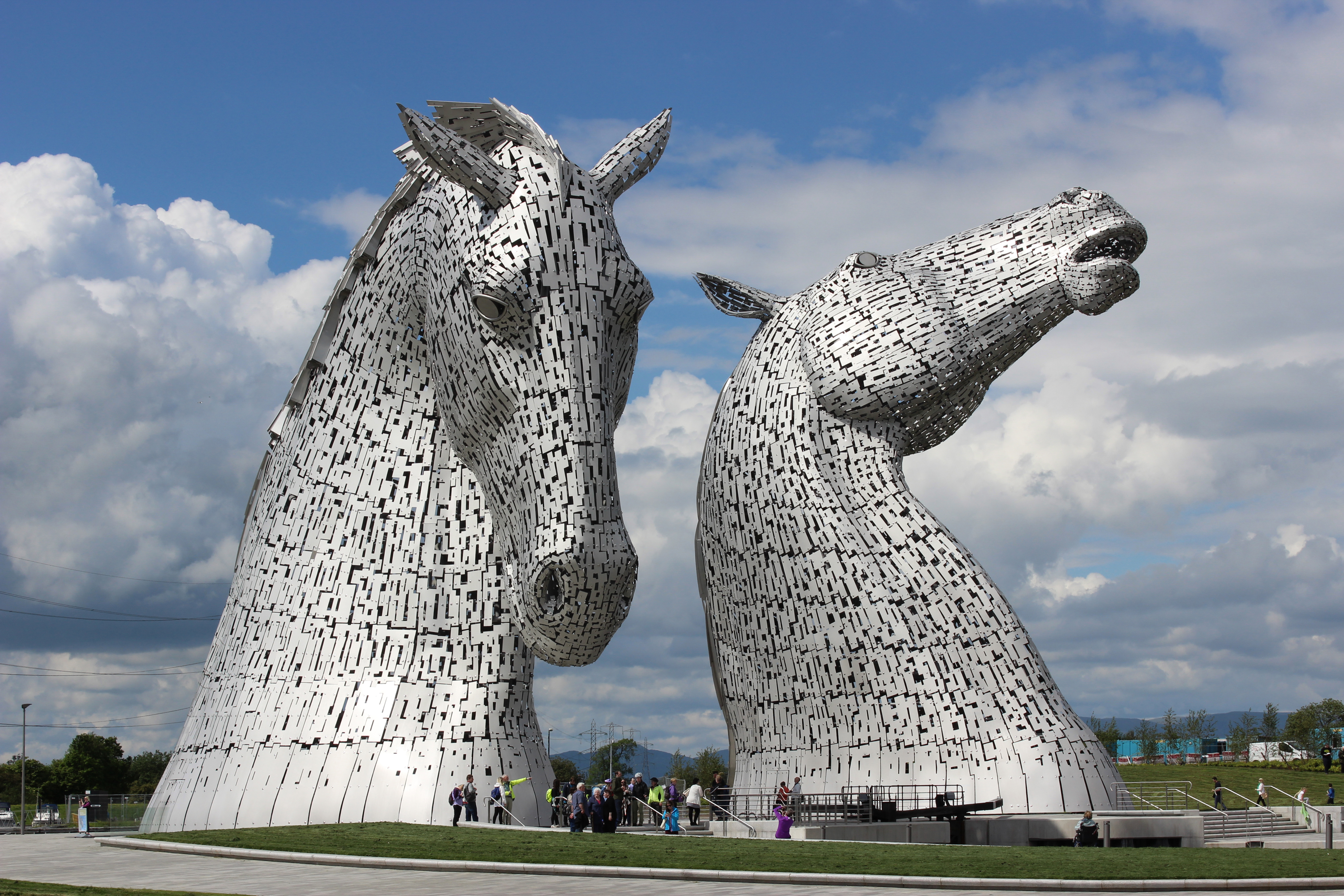
The Kelpies at Helix Park

Today, the economy of Falkirk is focused on retail and services, in contrast to the heavy industries and manufacturing sectors which contributed to the growth of the town over the last 300 years. Falkirk is a large retail centre catering to the town itself and a wide surrounding area, stretching from Cumbernauld in the west to Bo'ness in the east. The retailer Marks and Spencer opened a store in Falkirk Town Centre in 1936 but this closed in 2018 (the building is now a creative arts space). The High Street was pedestrianised in the late 1980s, and the Howgate Shopping Centre opened in April 1990. Another shopping centre, Callendar Square was opened in 1993 but finally closed in 2020. A number of supermarkets including Tesco, Asda, Morrisons and Scottish Co-op have developed on peripheral sites surrounding the town centre since the late 1990s.

The public sector and public services also have a foothold in the Falkirk area. Falkirk Council is one of the largest employers in this sphere, with a workforce of over 7,000, many based at the council headquarters in the town centre. One of the principal offices of the UK Child Support Agency, covering Scotland and the north east of England, is located in the Callendar Business Park on the outskirts of Falkirk. Similarly the National Health Service (NHS) and Department for Work and Pensions have a presence in the town and employ local residents.

Many Falkirk residents are also employed within the petrochemicals sector based in neighbouring Grangemouth where there is an agglomeration of such industries underpinned by the Ineos (formerly BP) oil refinery located there. Alexander Dennis, one of the world's largest bus manufacturers, is headquartered in Falkirk with the operations plant located nearby.

== Culture ==
Anthony Aston's theatre company began a tour at the Falkirk tolbooth in 1728.

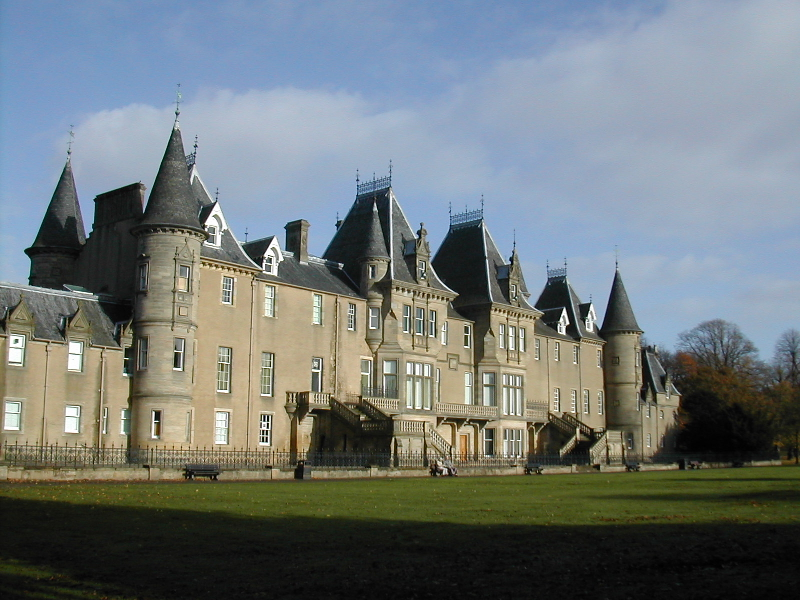
Callendar House, situated in Callendar Park

Falkirk hosted a national arts festival which ran in Callendar Park from 2000 to 2009 called Big In Falkirk. After its inception in 2000, the festival won Scottish Thistle Award for Events & Festivals in 2005. Consisting of a free weekend of events, the festival was one of the largest cultural events in Scotland, attracting over 100,000 people. Hosted in Falkirk's historical Callendar Park, the venue covers 180 acres (75 hectares) with Callendar House as the focal point, the entertainment featured a wide variety of outdoor theatre, pyrotechnic displays, arts, comedy and big name music acts, alongside activities for all ages.

Falkirk hosted the Royal National Mòd in 2008. The Gold medals were won by Falkirk resident Lyle Kennedy and Kerrie Finlay from Inverness. Interest in Gaelic has grown in Falkirk since the Mòd and there are now five Gaelic organisations active in the Falkirk area: An Clas Gàidhlig (provides Gaelic lessons to adults), An Comunn Gàidhealach Meur na h-Eaglaise Brice (is the local branch of An Comunn Gàidhealach), Fèis Fhoirt (provides traditional music and Gaelic song tuition for children and adults), Falkirk Gaelic Forum (promotes Gaelic in Falkirk) and Falkirk Junior Gaelic Choir (is a long established and successful youth choir).

=== Recreation ===
The historical Callendar House is an imposing mansion with a 600-year history which is now a public museum and open access parkland, with a cafe and shop. The Park Gallery, a contemporary art gallery is also based in the house.

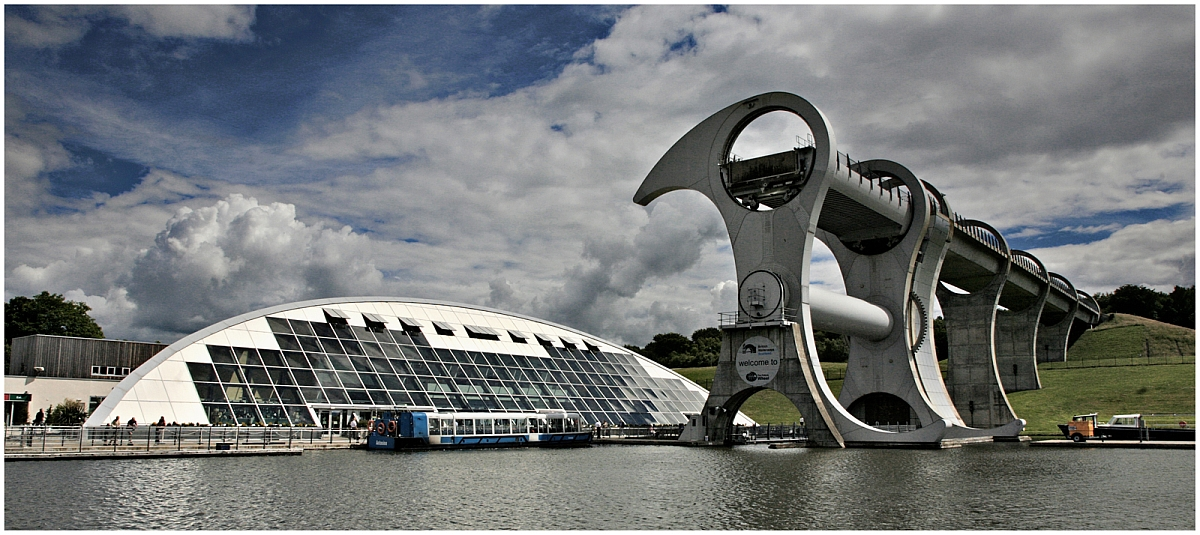
The Falkirk Wheel

=== Health ===
Falkirk is administered by NHS Forth Valley, this includes the unitary authorities of Falkirk, Stirling and Clackmannanshire. Following the opening of the new Forth Valley Royal Hospital, the Falkirk and District Royal Infirmary was renamed Falkirk Community Hospital with many of the main services, including the accident and emergency unit being transferred. Falkirk Community Hospital will still provide many services like podiatry and palliative care. The Community Hospital continues to have a Minor Injury Unit, to treat emergency cases of a non life-threatening nature. In-patient and community services at Bonnybridge Hospital will re-locate to Falkirk Community Hospital in 2012, once new modern, en-suite accommodation has been developed. A new purpose-built dental centre, Langlees Dental Centre, provides a "teach and treat" dental centre in the Langlees area of Falkirk opened in August 2009. It has seven dental surgeries and is involved in training final year students at Glasgow Dental School.

== Landmarks ==
The Falkirk Wheel, the only rotary canal connector in the world, is located within Falkirk. The attraction was completed in 2002 and it connects the Forth and Clyde Canal to the Union Canal.

On Falkirk High Street lies the Falkirk Steeple. The current building was built in 1814 and is protected as a category A listed building. A stylised image of the steeple appears on the crest of Falkirk Football Club. The Steeple is widely regarded as the centre point of the town. Nearby, on Cow Wynd is the Tattie Kirk, a Category B listed octagonal former church built in 1804, adjacent to its former graveyard.

The FTH Theatre (the "Falkirk Town Hall Theatre") in West Bridge Street was commissioned to replace the old town hall in Newmarket Street which was demolished in 1968. In 2022, it was announced that the Town Hall and FTH Theatre would close as the building required significant renovation. In 2023, it was announced that the council would purchase the empty former Callendar Square shopping centre. The centre is due to be demolished in 2024 with a view to constructing a combined new town hall, theatre, library and civic space for Falkirk.

Alongside the M9 between Falkirk and Grangemouth, The Kelpies are 30-metre-high (98 ft) horse-head sculptures depicting kelpies (shape-shifting water spirits). They are part of Helix Park, a land transformation project to improve the connections between and around communities in Falkirk.

== Transport ==
=== Roads ===
The Falkirk Area occupies a central position in Scotland, with direct access from the key north–south and east–west motorway networks: the M9 from the north and east and the M876 from the west. Falkirk has main rail and canal routes within easy reach from Edinburgh and Glasgow; it is central to access to both Glasgow and Edinburgh airports. Falkirk is well situated both for access by rail from England and for access to other parts of Scotland excluding Fife, which has no direct rail link to Falkirk. Road access is to Fife provided by the Kincardine Bridge, Clackmannanshire Bridge and the Forth Road Bridge, via the M9.

=== Railway ===
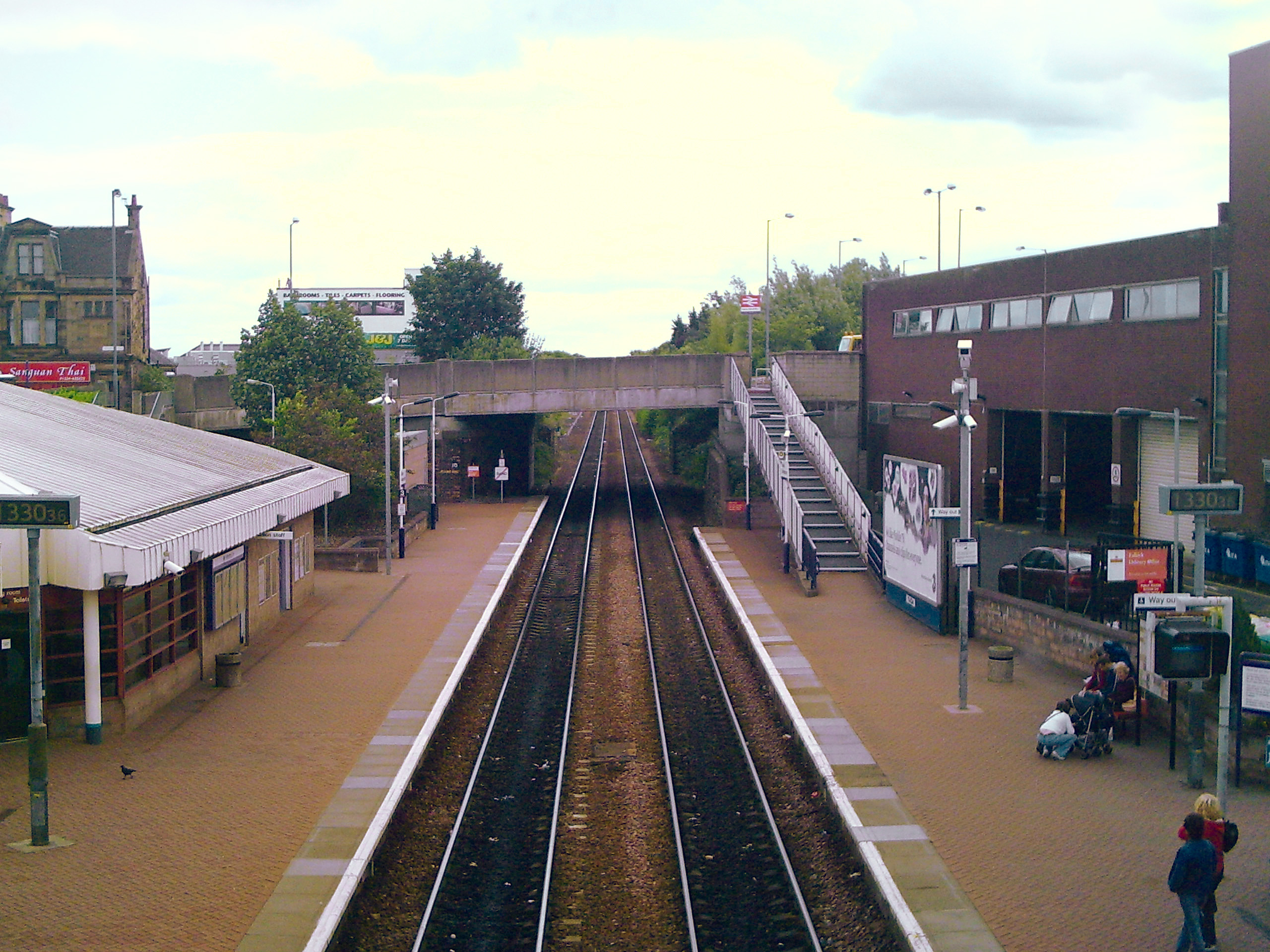
The view from the footbridge at Falkirk Grahamston, looking east.

Falkirk has two railway stations: Falkirk High and Falkirk Grahamston.

==== Falkirk High ====
Falkirk High is on the main Glasgow-Edinburgh line, with connections to either city running on a 15-minute frequency. At peak times, 8 trains per hour stop: 4 for Glasgow Queen Street via Croy and 4 for Edinburgh Waverley, via Polmont and Linlithgow. Journey times to Edinburgh vary from 24 minutes to 35 minutes, depending on stopping stations and time of day; the journey time is between 18 and 28 minutes to Glasgow.

==== Falkirk Grahamston ====
Falkirk Grahamston lies on the Edinburgh to Dunblane Line. To Edinburgh Waverley, there are 4 trains per hour, with journey times varying around 34 minutes. To Glasgow Queen Street, there are 2 trains per hour via the Cumbernauld Line with journey times from 39 minutes to 43 minutes.

=== Buses ===
The former Falkirk bus station lies in the town centre however since 20 August 2018 has been closed. Its bus routes which provided links to the cities of Stirling, Edinburgh and Glasgow, as well as local routes have now been moved to the nearby street of Newmarket Street.

Bus services are mainly run by McGill's Midland Bluebird however a few Stagecoach South Scotland services do serve the town.

== Education ==
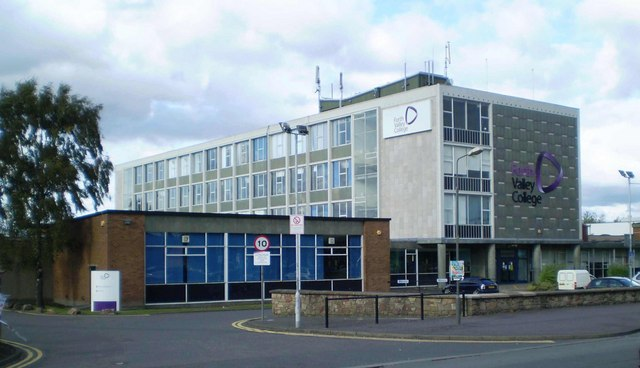
Forth Valley College, Falkirk Campus

Falkirk is home to one of the four campuses of Forth Valley College which was formed on 1 August 2005 from the merger of Falkirk, Stirling and Clackmannan colleges. The Falkirk Campus is by far the largest of the four campuses.

=== Secondary schools ===
Falkirk District is served by eight high schools which have all been recently rebuilt.

School	Roll	Opened	Catchment area
Bo'ness Academy		Originally 1931, rebuilt 2000	Blackness, Bo'ness Public, Deanburn, Grange, and Kinneil Primary Schools
Braes High School		2000	Avonbridge, California, Drumbowie, Maddiston, Shieldhill and Wallacestone Primary Schools
Denny High School		Originally 1959	Denny, Nethermains, Dunipace, Head of Muir, Bankier and Bonnybridge Primary Schools
Falkirk High School	1,200	Originally 1886, rebuilt 2010	Bainsford, Bantaskin, Carmuirs, Comely Park, Easter Carmuirs, Langlees, Limerigg and Slamannan Primary Schools
Graeme High School	1,200	Originally 1930, rebuilt 2000	Hallglen, Laurieston, St. Margaret's, Victoria, Westquarter and Whitecross Primary Schools
Grangemouth High School	810	rebuilt 2009	Bowhouse, Beancross, and Moray Primary Schools
Larbert High School	1,700	Originally 1885, rebuilt 2000	Airth, Bothkennar, Carron, Carronshore, Kinnaird, Ladeside, Larbert Village and Stenhousemuir Primary Schools
St. Mungo's High School	1,200	Originally 1953, rebuilt 2009	Falkirk area

== Media ==
Falkirk is served by a weekly newspaper, the Falkirk Herald, which is published by Johnston Press. The company was established by the Johnston family from Falkirk, who have been involved in publishing since 1767. The family acquired the Herald, their first newspaper, in 1846. The publishing company was renamed F Johnston & Co Ltd in 1882, a title it would retain until it was floated on the London Stock Exchange as Johnston Press in 1988. The corporate headquarters of Johnston Press are now in Edinburgh, but the company retains two offices in Falkirk and Grangemouth.

== Religion ==
The 2001 census showed the majority of the population claim to belong to one of the Christian denominations with 48% of these being Church of Scotland, 12% being Roman Catholic, and 5% belonging to other Christian denominations. 29% of people belong to no religion, about 1% above the national figure.

The Church of Scotland's Presbytery of Falkirk includes congregations in Bo'ness, Bonnybridge, Cumbernauld, Grangemouth and Larbert, as well as Falkirk. The Catholic St Francis Xavier's Church, Falkirk lies in the town.

== Sport ==
=== Football ===
==== Men's ====
Falkirk currently has three men's football teams, Falkirk Football Club, Stenhousemuir F.C. and East Stirlingshire Football Club.

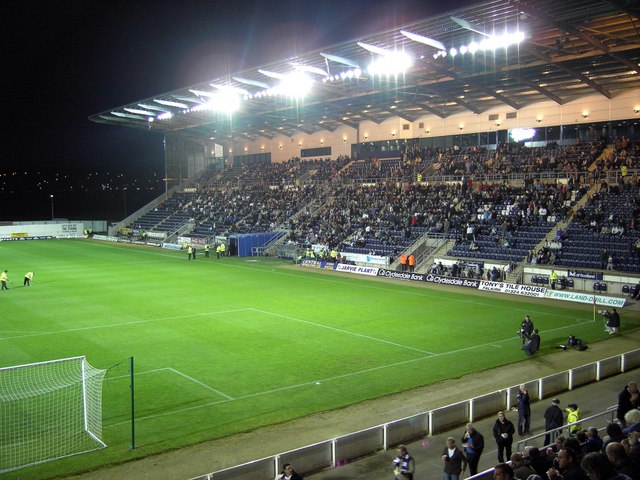
The main stand of the Falkirk Stadium

Falkirk F.C. was founded in 1876 and was elected to compete in the Scottish Football League in 1902. The club's highest ranking came in the 1907–08 season and once again in 1909–10 when the club finished runners-up of Division One, the country's top football division, losing out to Celtic F.C. on both occasions. The club has reached the final of the Scottish Cup on five occasions, emerging victorious twice in 1913 and 1957 respectively. The club currently competes in the Scottish Professional Football League and plays their home games at the Falkirk Stadium near Grangemouth.

The town's other men's club, East Stirlingshire F.C., was founded in 1881 originally as Bainsford Britannia and has competed in the Scottish Football League since 1900. The club has predominantly played in the lower leagues of Scottish football, spending only two whole seasons in the top division after being promoted from Division Two in 1931–32 and 1962–63. The club currently competes in the Lowland Football League and from the 2018–19 season will play their home games at the Falkirk Stadium following a groundshare agreement with Falkirk F.C. Firs Park was the home of the club for the majority of the club's existence but was vacated at the end of the 2007–08 season.

==== Women's ====
Falkirk currently has two women's football teams, Central Girls Football Academy and Falkirk Ladies. Central play in the second tier (SWPL2) and Falkirk play in the third tier (SWFL) of women's football.

=== Roller Derby ===
Falkirk is home to Scotland's first Co-ed Roller Derby League. Clubs from the area are the Skelpies men's team, the Central Belters women's team and the Belter Skelpers Co-ed team.

=== Rugby ===
Falkirk Rugby Club can trace their roots to 1906 when F.R.F.C. was first formed. It was disbanded at the start of World War I. In 1972 the club was resurrected when the works team from ICI Grangemouth decided to become "open" and looked for a new home. They initially played at Stirling Road playing fields before building their clubhouse at the present site at Sunnyside in 1981. The club has risen through the ranks of rugby winning six consecutive promotions, five of them as league champions, a Scottish record.

=== Hockey ===
Falkirk also has a hockey team, Falkirk and Linlithgow Hockey Club, which was formed in from various mergers of other hockey clubs throughout the years. It now has multiple men's and women's teams which play in various leagues, with the first team playing in the Scottish Hockey National Leagues.

=== Basketball ===
Falkirk Fury Basketball Club, currently called Clark Eriksson Fury Basketball Club in a sponsorship deal with local firm Clark Eriksson, represents the town in the sport. The team was established in 1992 and originally consisted of players from Falkirk High School and sports development players. Today the team competes in all 6 Scottish National Age Groups. The men's side currently competes in the Scottish Men's National League, the top league in Scottish basketball and is considered the second tier of British basketball below the BBL and in line with the English Basketball League. The club plays home games at the Mariner Centre in Camelon or sometimes at the Grangemouth sports complex.

Boxing

=== Archery ===
Falkirk has a number of archery clubs in and around the greater Falkirk area, including the Falkirk Company of Archers that was established in 1971 and is affiliated to the Scottish Archery Association (SAA) which is a region of the national governing body; Archery GB. During summer, members shoot outdoors on Sunnyside playing fields and during winter members shoot indoors at Woodlands Games Hall. The club is a target archery club with most members shooting recurve bow, though traditional archery has made a resurgence in the club recently with some members shooting barebows, horse bows and longbow.

== Twin towns ==
Falkirk is twinned with:

- Créteil, France
- Odenwald, Germany
- Quimper, France
- San Rafael, California, United States

== Notable people ==
=== Art and literature ===
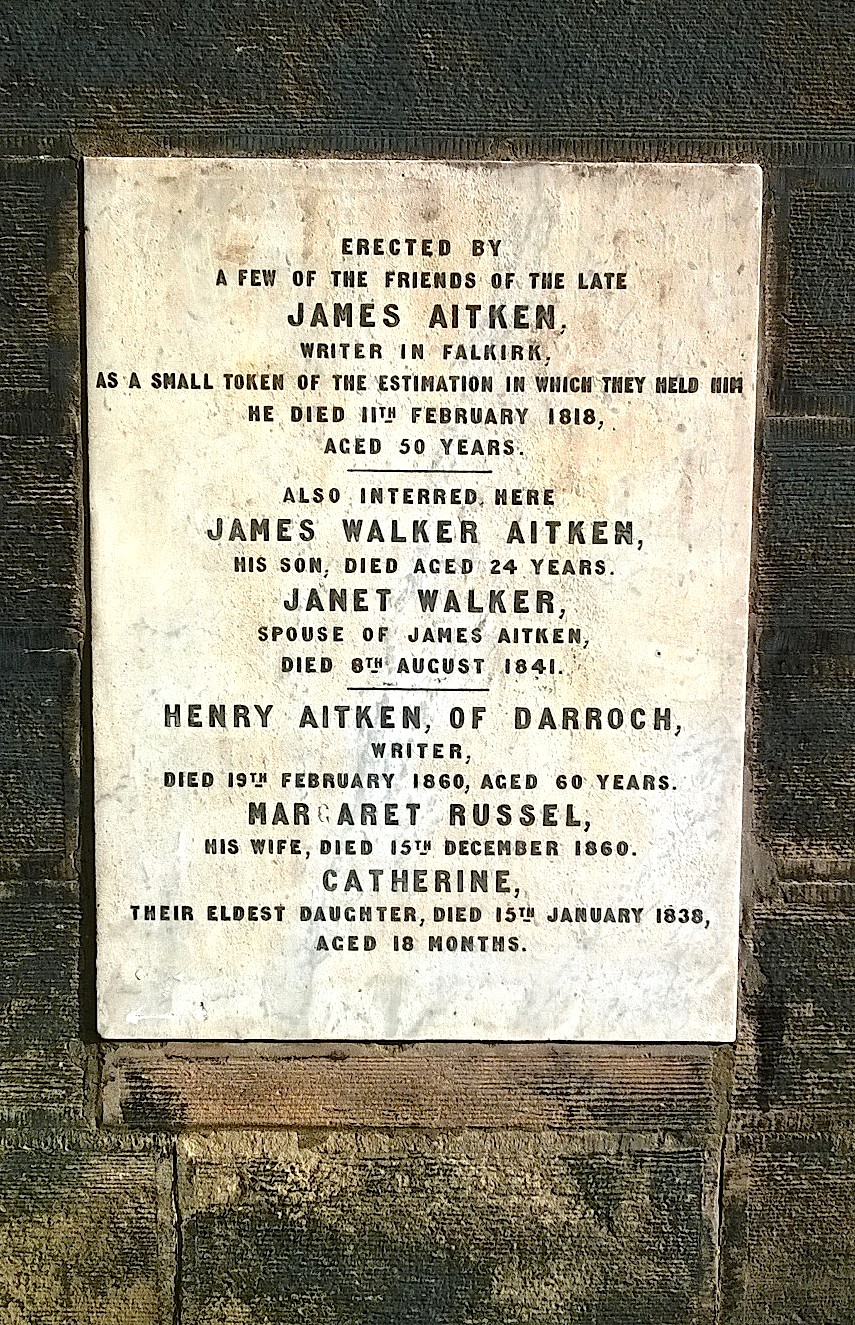
James Aitken, Falkirk writer died 1818

- Alan Bissett (born 1975), novelist
- Dame Elizabeth Blackadder (1931–2021), artist
- Alan Davie (1920–2014), artist (born Grangemouth)
- Janet Paisley (1948–2018), poet, playwright, author
- Stuart Reid - children's book author

=== Business and industry ===
- Walter Alexander - millionaire founder of Walter Alexander Coachbuilders in Falkirk, later to become the world's largest builder of coaches and buses, Alexander Dennis
- Adam Crozier - chief executive of ITV plc and former chief executive of the Football Association
- Captain Robert Dollar - the Scottish-American businessman, was born in Falkirk and maintained a house there, which is now the centre of Dollar Park
- William Forbes of Callendar - the proprietor of Carron Iron Works, was the largest landowner in Stirlingshire, and was seated in the centre of Falkirk at Callendar House
- Henry Adolph Salvesen naval architect and exporter
- James Walker (engineer) - influential civil engineer of the first half of the 19th century
- Sir John Wilson, 1st Baronet - made a fortune as a coal-master and built Bantaskine House on the South Bantaskine Estate, Falkirk. He was Unionist MP for Falkirk and was made a baronet

=== Historical ===
- The Earls of Callendar and Linlithgow - were seated in the centre of Falkirk, at Callendar House, before being stripped of their titles. Other peers historically connected to the area include the Marquess of Zetland whose estate was in Grangemouth, the Earl of Dunmore who owned the nearby Pineapple, Lord Thurlow of Kinnaird, the Duke of Montrose and the Duke of Hamilton. The Bolton baronets of Carronhall were also seated near Falkirk, as were the Bruce baronets of Stenhouse, of whom the actor Nigel Bruce was a member, growing up at Stenhouse Castle.

=== Media and entertainment ===
- Kaye Adams - Television presenter
- Ruth Connell - Actress and producer
- Elizabeth Fraser - Founding member and lead singer of the band from Grangemouth Cocteau Twins
- Robin Guthrie - Founding member and guitarist of the band from Grangemouth Cocteau Twins, music producer
- Brian McNeill - Founding member of the Battlefield Band, Scottish folk singer
- Forbes Masson - Actor and Writer
- Malcolm Middleton, David Gow and Aidan Moffat of the post-folk band Arab Strap
- Euan Morton - Actor and Singer, known for his role as Boy George in the musical Taboo
- David Paisley - Actor and Singer
- Brian Welsh – Film and television director and screenwriter

=== Politics and society ===
- Elizabeth Caradus - Suffragette and Temperance activist
- Tommy Douglas - Scottish-Canadian social democratic politician, who is often cited as "father" of Canada's single-payer public health insurance system. Voted the "greatest Canadian of all time" in a nationwide poll
- Thomas W. Howie - Former Falkirk councillor
- John McAleese - team leader during the SAS assault on the Iranian embassy in May 1980 (brought up in Laurieston)
- Sheila McKechnie - Scottish trade unionist, housing campaigner and consumer activist
- David Muir - former Director of Political Strategy to former Prime Minister Gordon Brown
- Robert D. Wilson - American politician and farmer; served in the Wisconsin State Assembly and was born in Falkirk
- Iain Lindsay, British diplomat
- Jack MacDonald - Scottish-Canadian communist politician, leader of the Communist Party of Canada between 1923 and 1929

=== Science and technology ===
- John Aitken - physicist and meteorologist, operated from a laboratory in his home in Falkirk, where he first detected atmospheric dust particles using the koniscope, his invention.
- Ernest Masson Anderson -geologist, born in Falkirk
- Margaret Cowie Crowe (1882–1973), nurse who served in Serbia and Russia during World War I
- George Forrest - a Scottish botanist. Famous for bringing back over 30,000 specimens of 10,000 plants mostly from the Yunnan Province of China.
- John McQueen Johnston - physician and pharmacologist
- George McRoberts (1839–1896) explosives expert
- Alfred Nobel befriended McRoberts and set up a detonator factory in Falkirk, living at Hawthorn Cottage in the Laurieston district for several years
- George Trapp (educator) - scientist and headmaster
- Eric Vance - Chemist responsible for the coloration of Nomex, the essential fabric of most military uniforms, effectively designing the future of camouflage.
- Henry Wade - Military and urological surgeon

=== Sport and recreation ===
- Nicola Docherty - Rangers W.F.C. & Internationalist footballer
- Brown Ferguson - former footballer & current Manager of Stenhousemuir F.C.
- Steve Frew - Commonwealth Games Gold Medalist.Grangemouth Gymnast who won Scotland's first Gymnastics Gold Medal in Commonwealth Games history.
- Colin Gallie - racing driver
- Bob Mauchline - footballer
- Bob McGregor - Swimmer who won silver in the 100m Freestyle at the 1964 Olympic Games
- John Meechan - footballer, centre-forward
- Charles Melville - cricketer
- Willie Ormond - former Hibs & Internationalist footballer
- David Provan - former Rangers & Plymouth Argyle footballer
- Leanne Ross - Glasgow City F.C. & Internationalist footballer
- Tam Scobbie - former Falkirk & St. Johnstone footballer
- Alex Scott - former Rangers, Everton & Internationalist footballer
- Eddie Turnbull - former Hibs & Internationalist footballer
- David Weir - former footballer
- Alex Wood (ice hockey) - ice hockey player

== Sources ==
- Dowds, T (2003): "The Forth and Clyde Canal - A History". Tuckwell Press. ISBN 1-86232-232-5
- Macleod, I (2004): "The Illustrated Encyclopaedia of Scotland". Lomond Books, Edinburgh. ISBN 1-84204-028-6
- Milne, D; Leitch, A; Duncan, A; Bairner, J & Johnston, J (1975): "The Falkirk and Grangemouth Area". Paper for the Scottish Association of Geography Teachers' (SAGT) conference, October 1975. Moray House College of Education, Edinburgh.
- Nimmo W (1880): "The History of Stirlingshire, Third Edition" Vol II. Hamilton, Adams and Company, Glasgow.
- Smith, R (2001): "The Making of Scotland". Canongate Books, Edinburgh. ISBN 1-84195-170-6
