= List of places in North Lanarkshire =

Map of places in North Lanarkshire compiled from this list

The List of places in North Lanarkshire is a list of links for any town, village, hamlet, castle golf course, historic house, hill fort, lighthouse, nature reserve, reservoir, river, and other place of interest in the North Lanarkshire council area of Scotland.

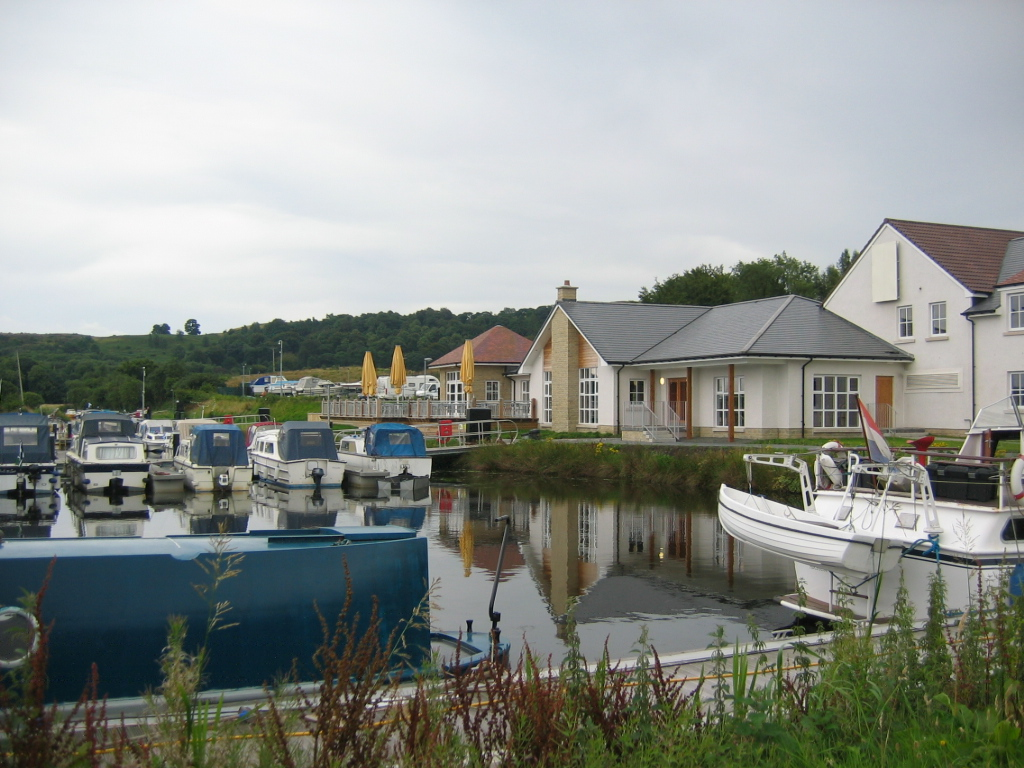
Auchinstarry Basin on the Forth & Clyde Canal

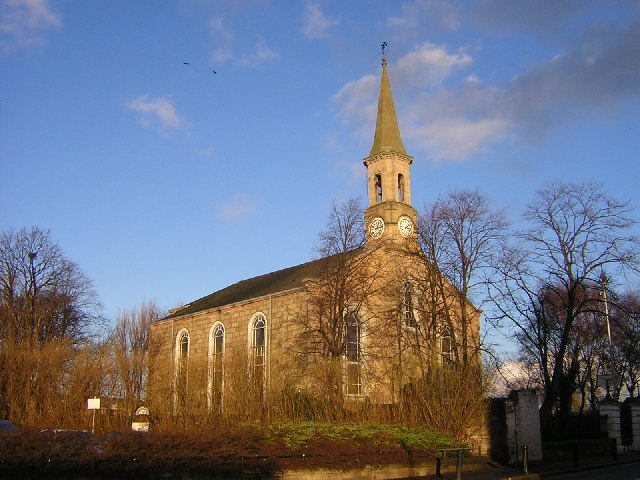
Bellshill, Saint Andrew's Church

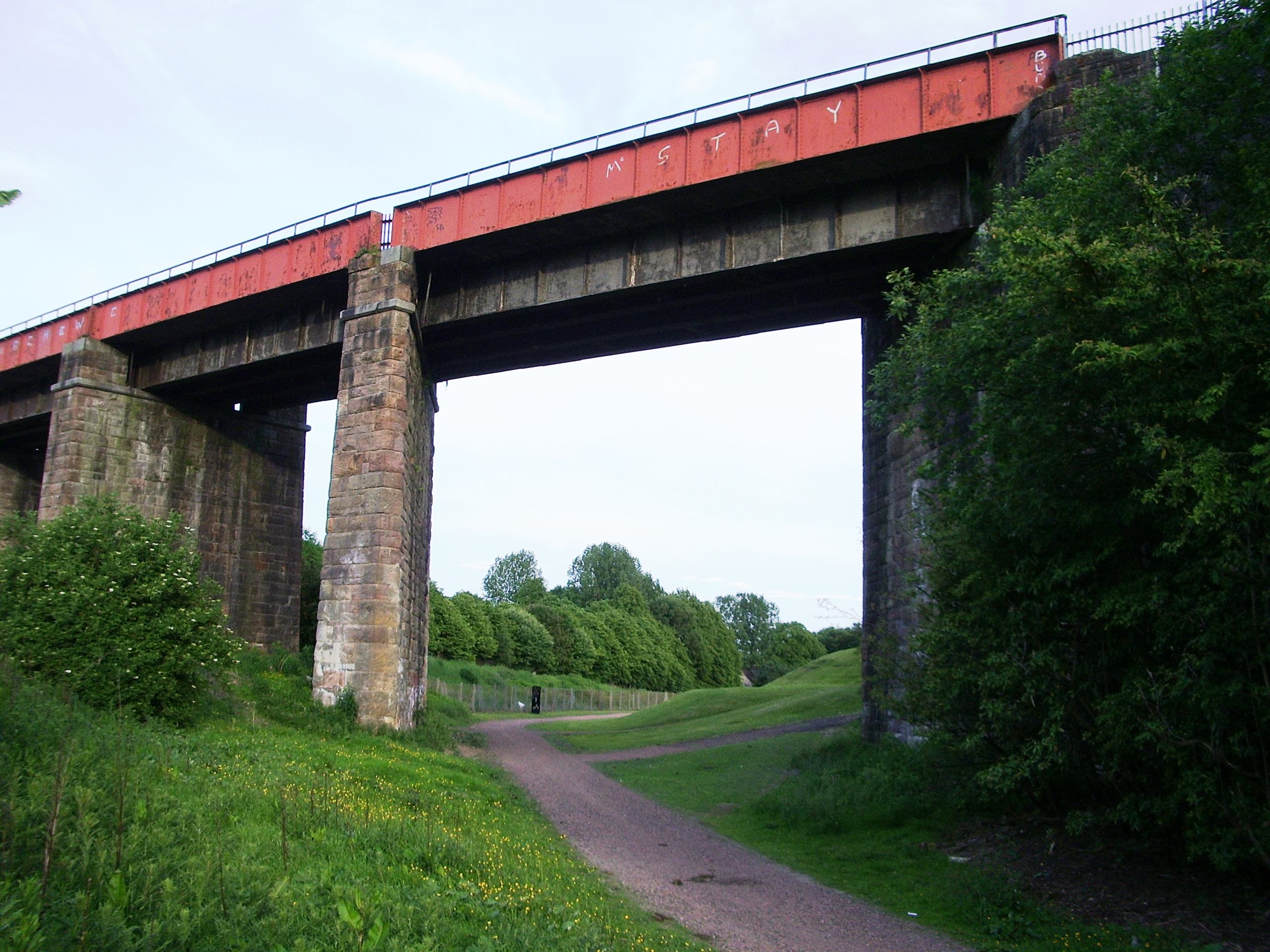
The Caledonian Viaduct over the Monkland Canal

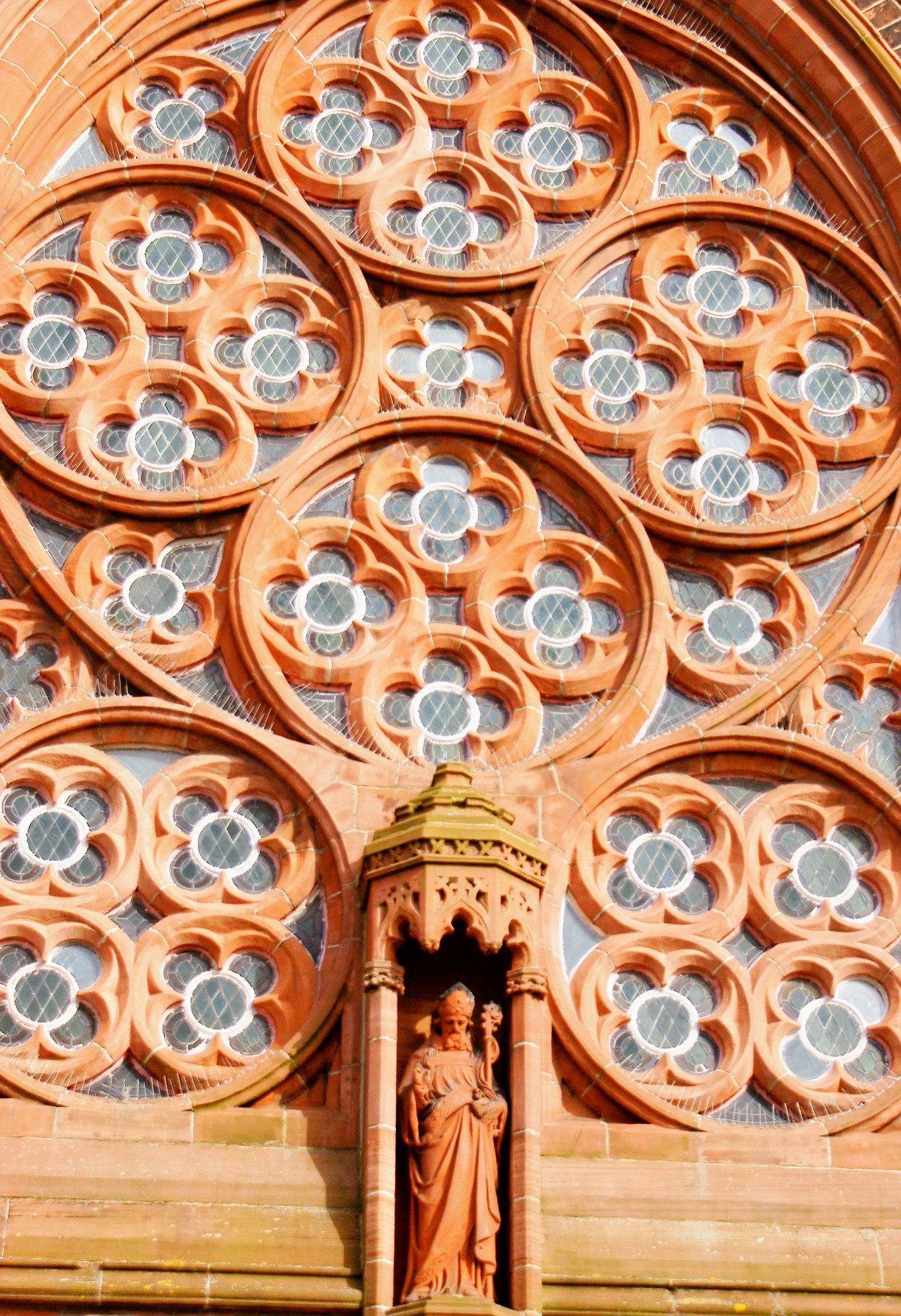
Coatbridge, Saint Augustine's Chapel

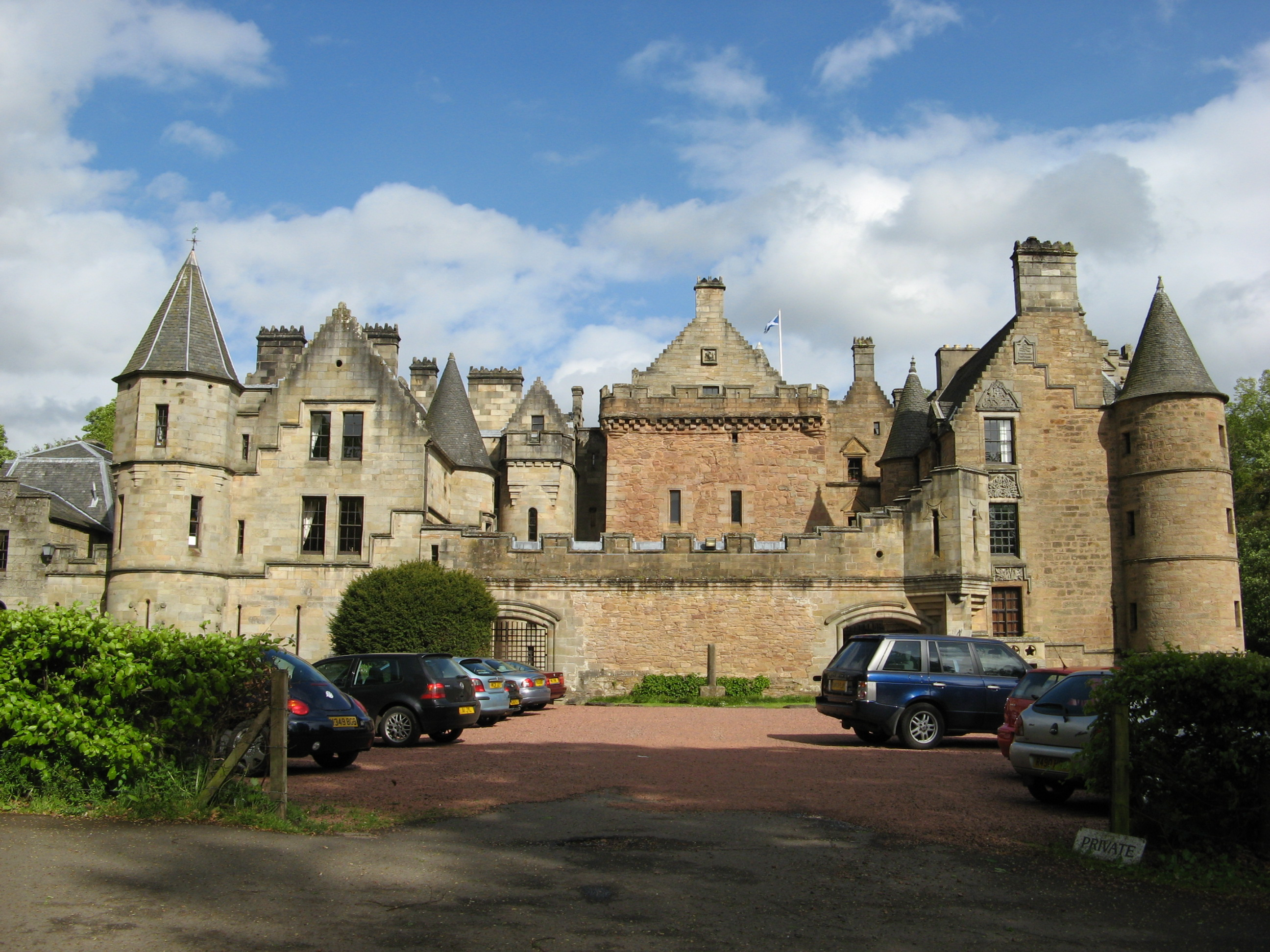
Dalzell House

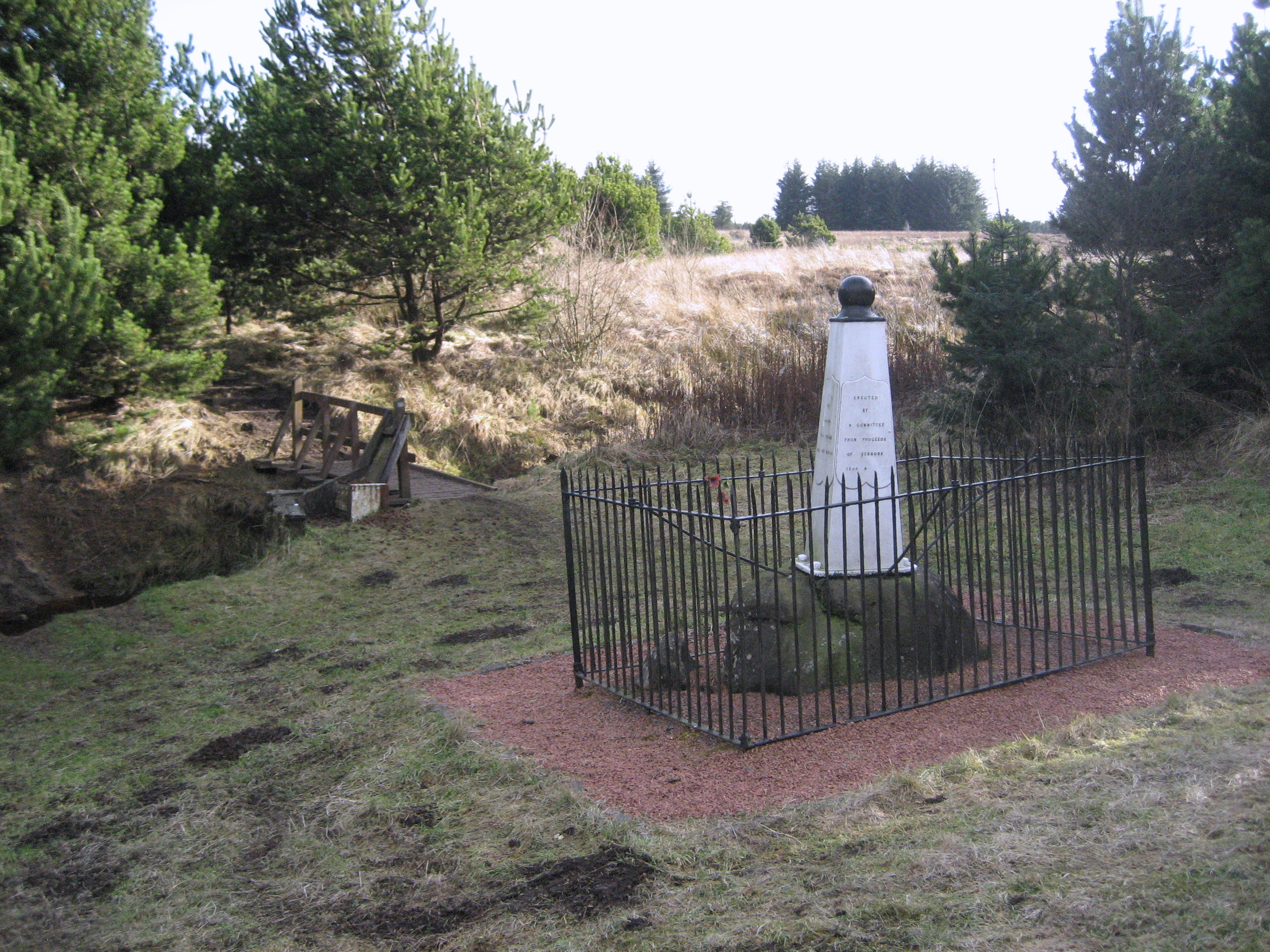
Harthill, Peden Stone

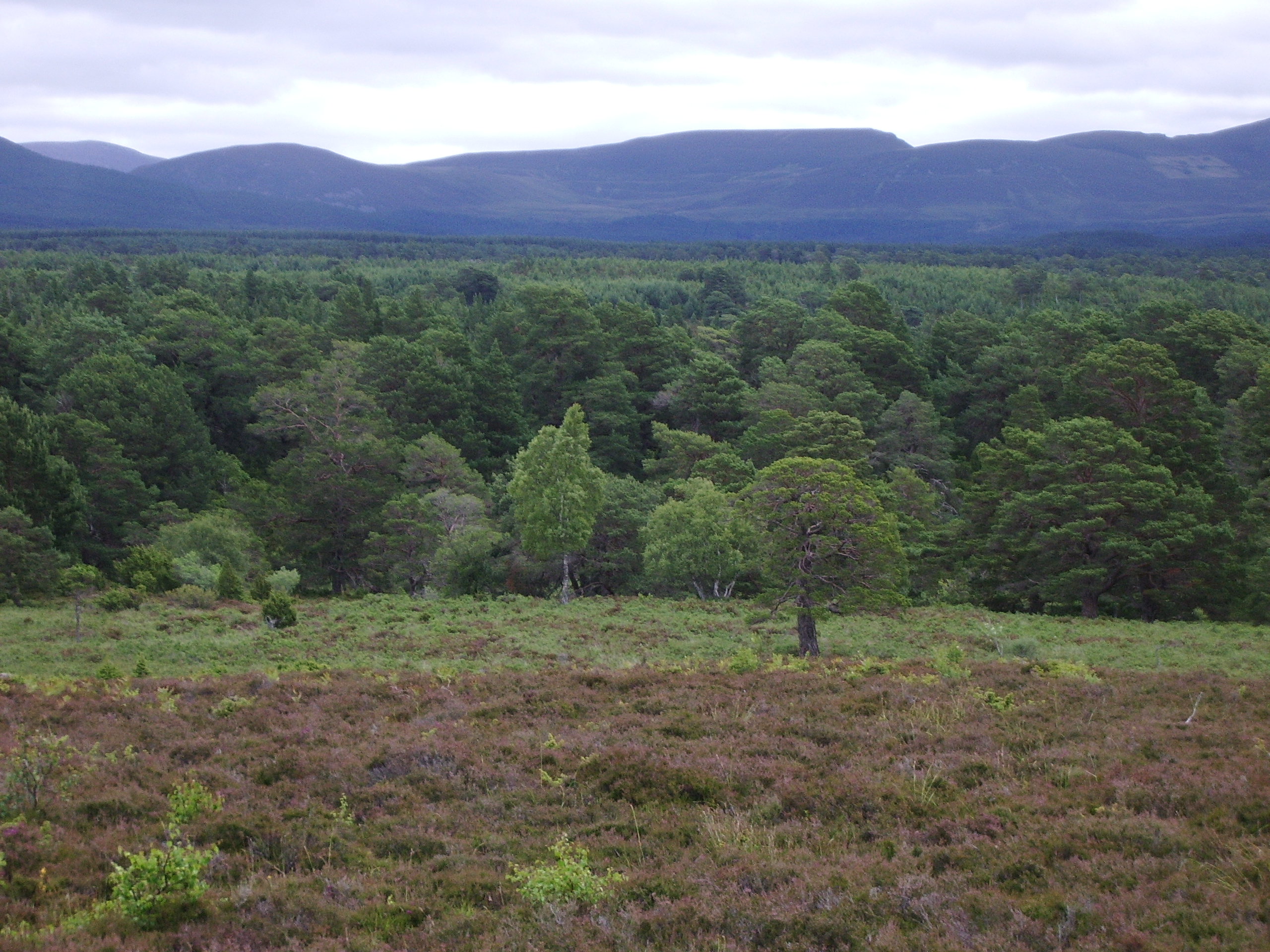
Rothiemurchus Forest

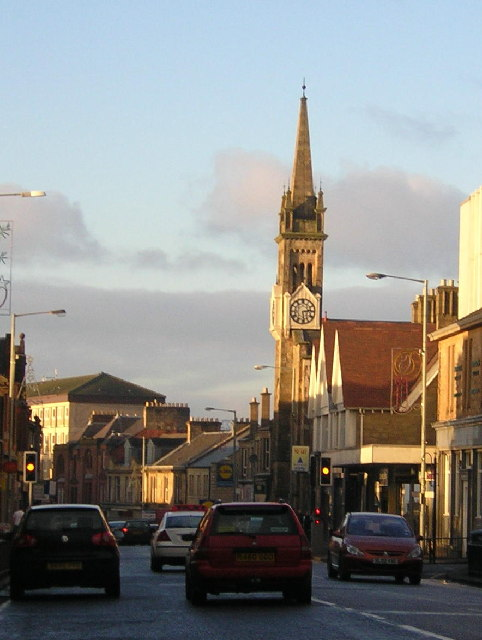
Wishaw

== A ==
- Abronhill
- Airbles
- Airbles railway station
- Airdrie
- Airdriehill
- Airdrie Public Observatory
- Airdrie railway station
- Allanton
- Annathill
- Auchinloch
- Auchinstarry

== B ==
- Balloch
- Banton
- Bargeddie
- Bargeddie railway station
- Barons Haugh RSPB Reserve
- Bellshill
- Bellshill railway station
- Birkenshaw
- Blackwood
- Blairhill
- Blairlinn
- Bogside
- Bonkle
- Bothwellhaugh
- Broadwood Stadium
- Burnfoot

== C ==
- Cairnhill
- Calderbank
- Caldercruix
- Caldercruix railway station
- Cambusnethan
- Carbrain
- Cardowan
- Carfin
- Carfin railway station
- Carnbroe
- Carrickstone
- Castle Cary Castle
- Chapelhall
- Chryston
- Clarkston
- Cleland
- Cleland railway station
- Cliftonhill
- Cliftonville
- Coatbridge
- Coatbridge Central railway station
- Coatbridge Sunnyside railway station
- Coatdyke
- Coatdyke railway station
- Coltness
- Colzium
- Condorrat
- Craigmarloch
- Craigneuk (Airdrie)
- Craigneuk (Wishaw)
- Croy
- Cumbernauld
- Cumbernauld Airport
- Cumbernauld House
- Cumbernauld railway station
- Cumbernauld town centre
- Cumbernauld Village

== D ==
- Dalzell House
- Dalziel Park
- Dimsdale
- Drumgelloch
- Drumgelloch railway station
- Drumpellier
- Drumpellier Country Park
- Dullatur
- Dumbreck Marsh
- Dunbeth
- Dundyvan
- Dykehead

== E ==
- Eastfield (Cumbernauld)
- Eastfield (Harthill)
- Eurocentral
- Excelsior Stadium

== F ==
- Fallside
- Fir Park Stadium
- Forgewood
- Forrestfield

== G ==
- Gadloch
- Garrion Bridge
- Garnkirk
- Gartcosh
- Gartlea
- Gartsherrie
- Glenboig
- Glenmavis
- Gowkthrapple
- Greenacres
- Greendykeside
- Greenend
- Greenfaulds
- Greengairs
- Greenhead
- Greenlink Cycle Path

== H ==
- Harthill
- Hartwood
- Hattonrigg
- Hillcrest
- Hillend Loch Railway Path
- Hillend Reservoir
- Holehills
- Holytown

== J ==
- Jerviston

== K ==
- Kildrum
- Kilsyth
- Kilsyth Castle
- Kirkwood
- Kirkwood railway station
- Kirkshaws

== L ==
- Langloan
- Lenziemill
- Longriggend
- Luggiebank
- Luggie Water

== M ==
- M&Ds
- Millerston
- Mollinsburn
- Monkland Canal
- Moodiesburn
- Morningside
- Mossend
- Mossend EuroTerminal
- Motherwell
- Motherwell railway station
- Motherwell Shopping Centre
- Mount Ellen
- Muirhead
- Muirhouse

== N ==
- Netherton
- Newarthill
- Newhouse
- Newmains
- New Stevenston
- North Calder Water
- North Lanarkshire Heritage Centre
- North Lodge
- North Motherwell

== O ==
- Old Monkland
- Orbiston
- Overtown

== P ==
- Palacerigg Country Park
- Pather
- Perchy Pond
- Petersburn
- Plains

== Q ==
- Queenzieburn

== R ==
- Ravenscraig
- Ravenscraig Regional Sports Facility
- Ravenscraig steelworks
- Ravenswood
- Rawyards
- Red Burn
- Riggend
- Rosehall

== S ==
- Salsburgh
- Seafar
- Shawhead
- Shieldmuir railway station
- Shotts
- Sikeside
- Smithstone
- South Calder Water
- Stand
- Stane
- Springhill
- Stepps
- Strathclyde Country Park
- Summerlee, Museum of Scottish Industrial Life

== T ==
- Tannochside
- Thrashbush
- Torbothie
- Torrance Park
- Townhead

== U ==
- Upperton
- University Hospital Monklands
- University Hospital Wishaw

== V ==
- Viewpark
- Viewpark Gardens

== W ==
- Wardpark
- Waterloo
- Wattston
- Westfield
- Westerwood
- Whifflet
- Whifflet railway station
- Whinhall
- Whitelees
- Wishaw
- Wishawhill
- Wishaw railway station

== See also ==
- List of places in Scotland
