= Cumbernauld railway station =

Railway station in North Lanarkshire, Scotland

Cumbernauld Scottish Gaelic: Comar nan Allt
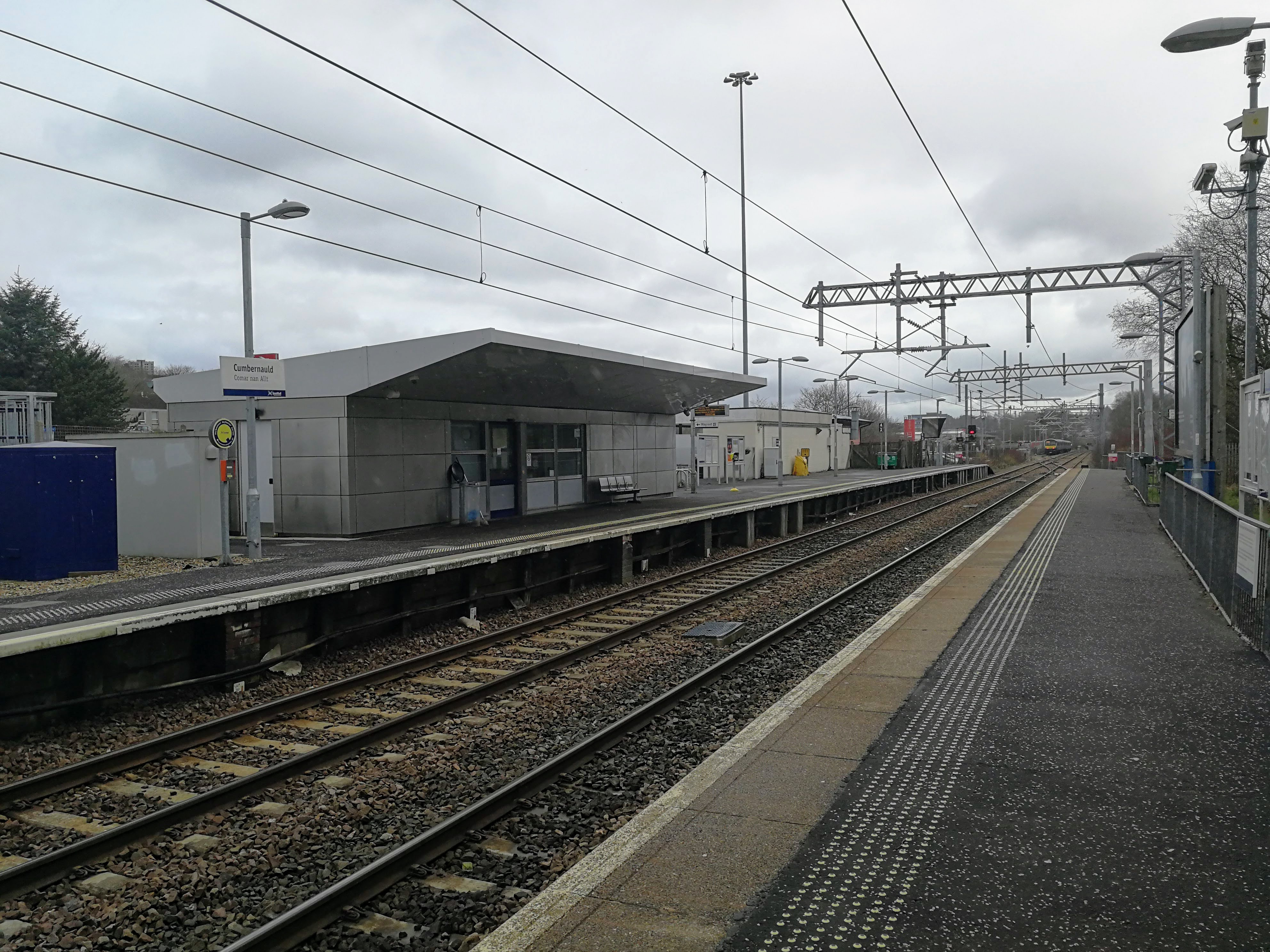

General information
- Location: Cumbernauld, North Lanarkshire; Scotland
- Coordinates: 55.9418°N 3.9807°W
- Grid reference: NS763738
- Manager: ScotRail
- Transit authority: SPT
- Platforms: 2

Other information
- Station code: CUB
- Fare zone: S6/S8

History
- Original company: Caledonian Railway
- Pre-grouping: Caledonian Railway
- Post-grouping: London, Midland and Scottish Railway

Key dates
- 7 August 1848: Opened
- August 1849: Closed
- April 1870: Reopened

Passengers
- 2021/22: ▲0.107 million
- Interchange: ▲2,358
- 2022/23: ▲0.140 million
- Interchange: ▲3,445
- 2023/24: ▲0.190 million
- Interchange: ▲5,246
- 2024/25: ▼0.188 million
- Interchange: ▼3,999
- 2025/26: ▲0.214 million
- Interchange: ▲9,669
Location
Notes
- Passenger statistics from the Office of Rail and Road

Cumbernauld railway station serves the town of Cumbernauld in North Lanarkshire, Scotland. The station is managed by ScotRail and is located on the Cumbernauld Line, 14 miles (23 km) north east of Glasgow Queen Street (High Level) station and the Motherwell to Cumbernauld Line, 11 3/4 miles (18.9 km) north of Motherwell. Trains serving the station are operated by ScotRail.

The patronage at Cumbernauld station does not compare well with that of stations in similar towns such as East Kilbride, possibly due to the awkward position on the southeastern periphery of the town, around a 20-minute walk from the town centre. Other residential areas (including Westfield and Balloch) are closer to Croy, while Condorrat and Greenfaulds are served by Greenfaulds railway station. Some areas like the Village or Abronhill are not within reasonable walking distance of a station, although Abronhill is close to the line, which was electrified in 2014.

== History ==
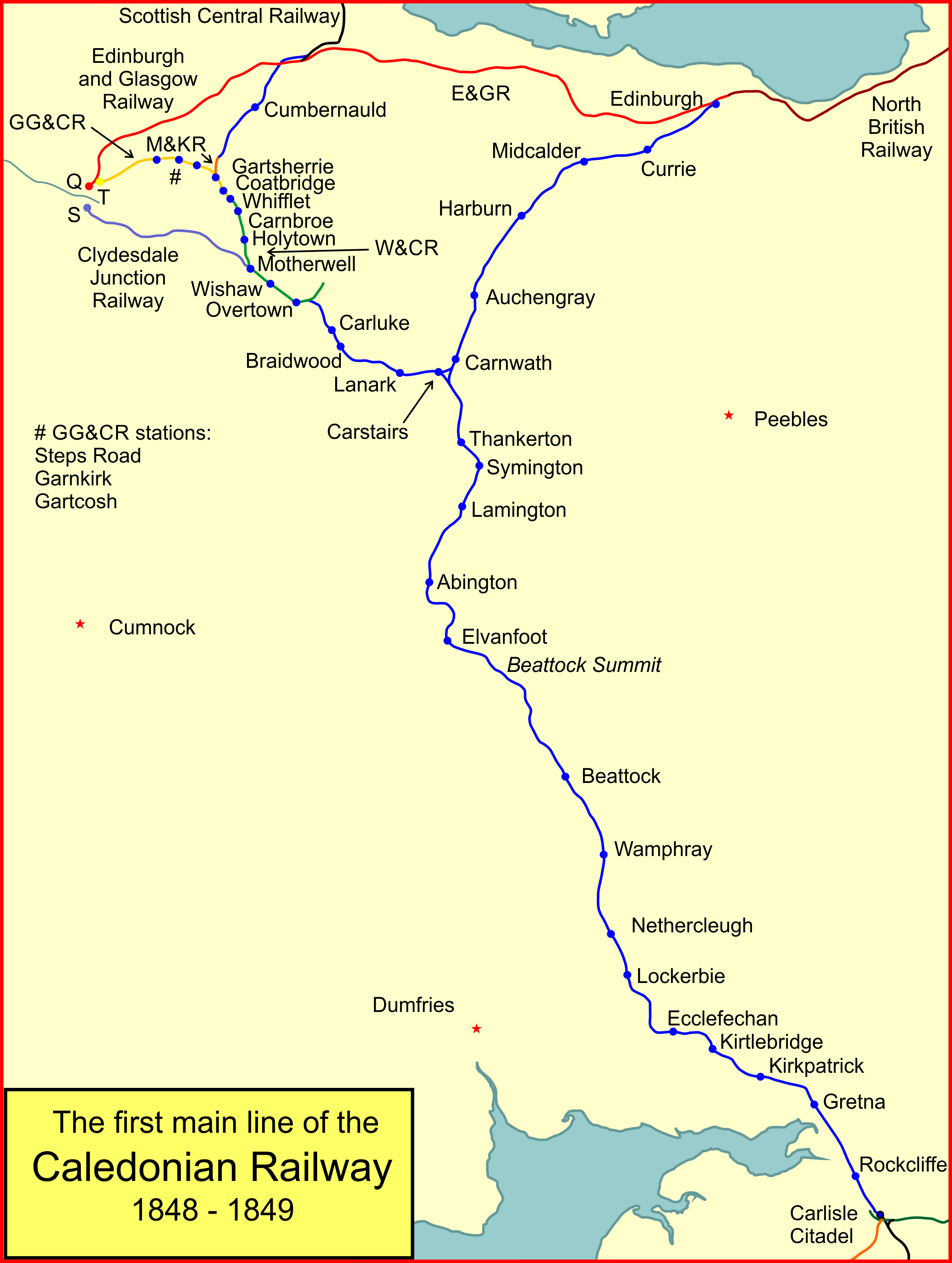
Caley main line

The station was built by the Caledonian Railway and opened on 7 August 1848 on their line from Gartsherrie (on the former Garnkirk and Glasgow Railway) to Greenhill on the Scottish Central Railway. The line gave the Caledonian access to central & north eastern Scotland from Glasgow and its main line from Carlisle, but the station at Cumbernauld wasn't a commercial success as the village it served wasn't particularly large; and so it closed after just one year of operation. It was eventually reopened in 1870 to be served by local passenger services from Glasgow Buchanan Street on the lines toward Falkirk & Stirling.

When planning the new town in the 1950s, there was some consideration made to siting the town centre near the current railway station rather than on the hill top. The railway station in this scheme would then have been moved to the Luggie and Shank valley near the A73, beyond Lenziemill and Blairlinn.

However, it wasn't until the after the building of the new town started that the area's population began to expand significantly, and usage of the station increased. This also ensured that the station avoided the Beeching Axe in the early 1960s, even though (as noted) it wasn't particularly well sited for many of the newly built residential developments.

The line did though lose its direct link with the city after the closure to passengers of the Buchanan Street terminus in November 1966. The diversion of all main line expresses and the remaining local routes into Queen Street left the station without any trains serving it, and so a replacement service had to be introduced. This consisted of a DMU shuttle along the old main line into Glasgow, which was still operational as far as the works at St Rollox; however, just east of there they were re-routed onto the former Edinburgh and Glasgow Railway's Sighthill Branch to Cowlairs, which they used as far as Springburn. Trains terminated there, with passengers having to change onto North Clyde Line electric services over the former City of Glasgow Union Railway branch to Bellgrove and Queen Street Low Level.

Regular local services southwards towards Coatbridge Central and Motherwell had also ceased by this time, although a limited number of longer distance trains continued to call there - notably the London Euston to Inverness Clansman & Royal Highlander expresses from the early 1970s onwards.

Through running to Queen Street High Level was eventually introduced in 1989, and since then several intermediate local stations along the line have reopened with backing from the Strathclyde Passenger Transport Executive. Services both northwards to Falkirk Grahamston (September 1999) and southwards to Motherwell (May 1996) have also been reintroduced, whilst the opening of the Cowlairs Chord in 1993 meant that services could now proceed directly to Queen Street without having to reverse alongside the depot at Eastfield as before. The lines to Glasgow & Coatbridge have been electrified (as part of the Edinburgh to Glasgow Improvement Programme), with electric operation beginning in the spring of 2014. This has seen service frequencies on the Glasgow line increased to three per hour, and through running on electric services to the west end of Glasgow via the North Clyde Line through Queen Street Low Level. The station building underwent major refurbishment as part of this work, with a new modular structure opened in 2014.

Further electrification northwards to Greenhill Junction was completed in 2018 (as part of the EGIP), which coincided with a further planned timetable recast that saw the existing service to Falkirk doubled to two trains per hour and extended through to Edinburgh Waverley via Polmont. This saw the town given direct links to the Scottish capital for the first time, as well as upping the Glasgow Queen Street service frequency to four trains per hour. The timetable upgrade & infrastructure work is being funded by Transport Scotland. The weekday and Saturday services from Glasgow Queen Street to Edinburgh via Cumbernauld were withdrawn in 2022.

== Services ==
=== 2017 ===
Off-Peak Monday to Saturday:

- 2tph to Dumbarton Central via Springburn and Glasgow Queen Street low level.
- 1tph to Glasgow Queen Street high level.
- 1tph to Falkirk Grahamston.
- 1tph to Dalmuir via Motherwell and Glasgow Central Low Level

On Sundays there is an hourly service to Partick via Springburn and Glasgow Queen Street low level.

=== 2023 ===
On Monday to Saturdays, There is a half hourly service southbound to Glasgow Queen Street and an hourly service to Dalmuir, There is also an hourly service northbound to Falkirk Grahamston.

On Sundays there is an hourly service to Glasgow but no service to Dalmuir or Falkirk Grahamston but connections for these stations can be made in Glasgow.

Preceding station	National Rail	Following station
Greenfaulds	ScotRail; Motherwell–Cumbernauld line	Terminus
Greenfaulds	ScotRail; Cumbernauld Line	Camelon
	Historical railways	
Greenfaulds; Line and Station open	CR Main Line; Caledonian Railway	Greenhill Lower; Line open; Station closed
Greenfaulds; Line and Station open	CR Main Line; Caledonian Railway	Bonnybridge; Line partially open; Station closed

== Signalling ==
Cumbernauld signal box, which had 35 levers, was located to the north of the station, on the east side of the line. Latterly it worked by Absolute Block to Greenfoot S.B. and by Track Circuit Block to Greenhill Junction S.B. Its primary function was to operate the crossover and reversing siding used by services that terminated & started back from here. This is still in use today.

Cumbernauld signal box closed on 3 May 1999, when the line was resignalled with colour light signals controlled from Cowlairs Signalling Centre.

== Gallery ==
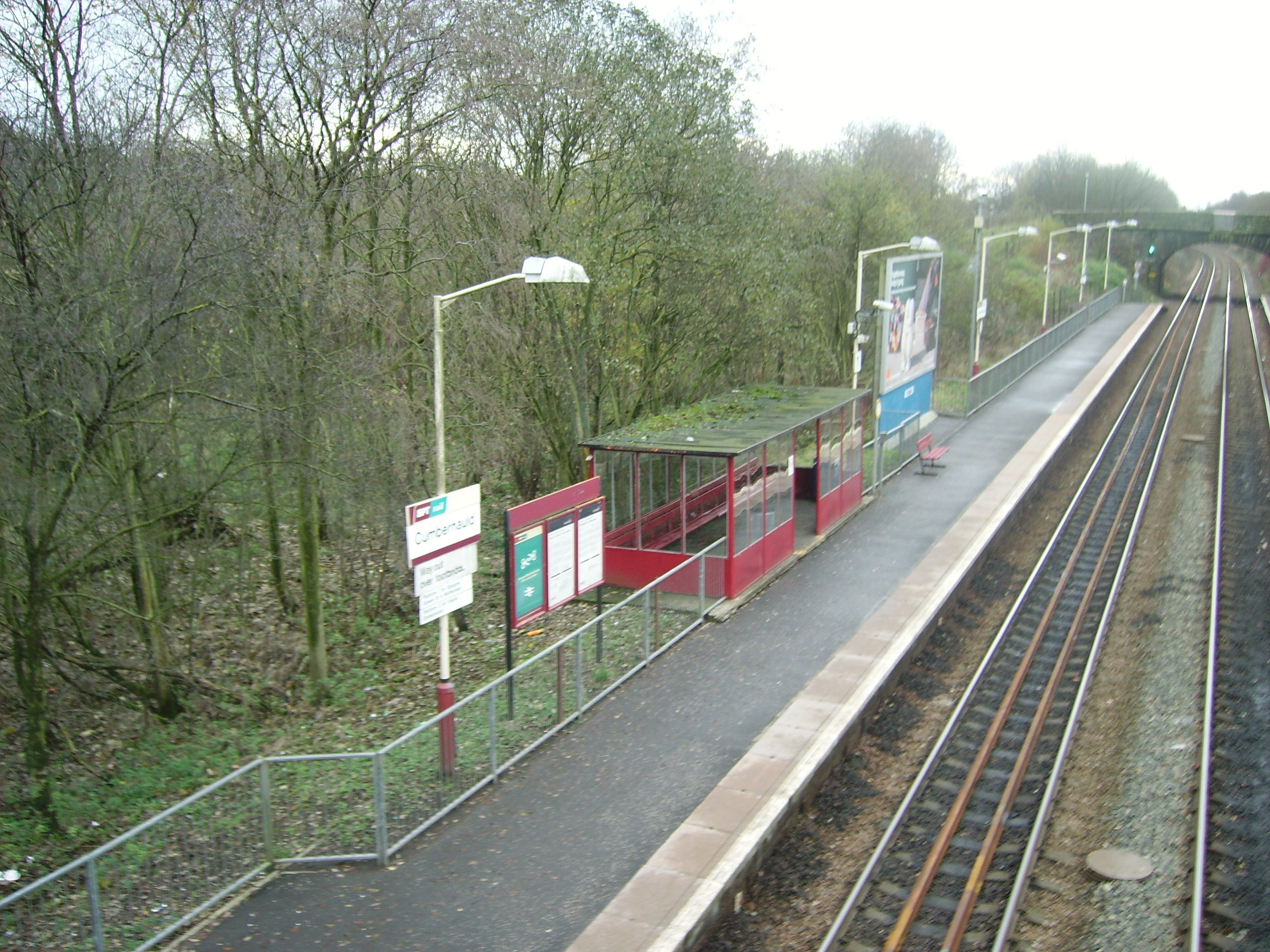
Cumbernauld station Platform 1 (Glasgow Queen Street and Motherwell bound services)

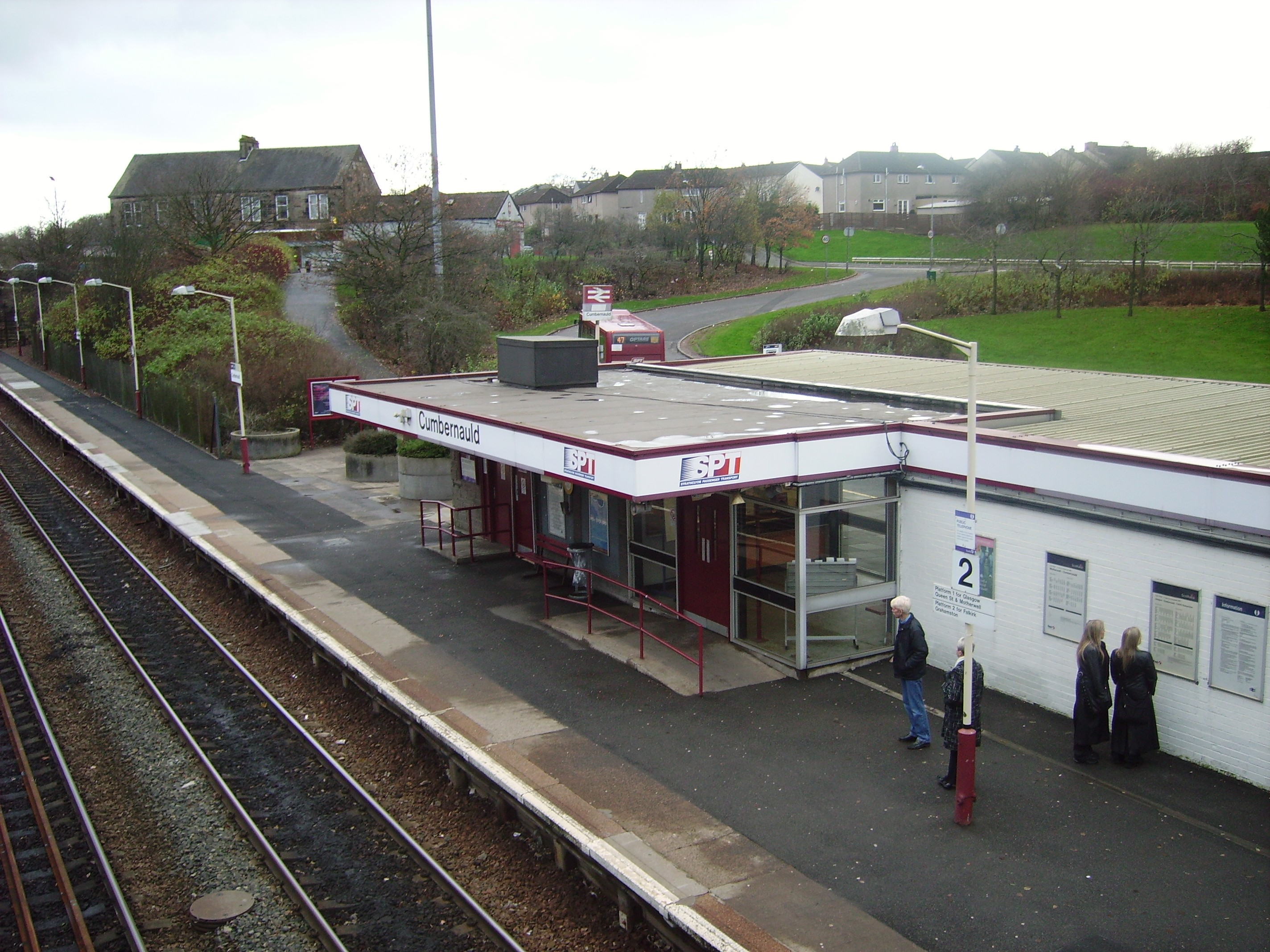
Cumbernauld station Platform 2 (Falkirk bound services)
