= Greenfaulds =

Area of Cumbernauld, Scotland

Coordinates: 55.936°N 4.012°W

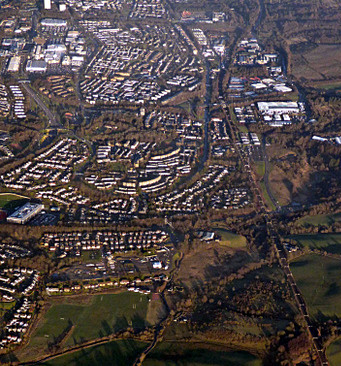
- Greenfaulds from the air photographed from above Condorrat. Carbrain is above Greenfaulds with Lenziemill to the right.

- Location within North Lanarkshire
- OS grid reference: NS743732
- Council area: North Lanarkshire
- Lieutenancy area: Dunbartonshire
- Country: Scotland
- Sovereign state: United Kingdom
- Post town: GLASGOW
- Postcode district: G67
- Dialling code: 01236
- Police: Scotland
- Fire: Scottish
- Ambulance: Scottish
- UK Parliament: Cumbernauld, Kilsyth and Kirkintilloch East (UK Parliament constituency)
- Scottish Parliament: Cumbernauld and Kilsyth

Greenfaulds (Scottish Gaelic: A' Bhuaile Ghlas, IPA:[əˈvuələˈɣɫ̪as̪]) is an area of the town of Cumbernauld in Scotland. Greenfaulds was a half council half private estate built in the late 1960s and early 1970s. The main road through the estate is a ring road with the private sector being on the outside of the road and the council side being in the inside. Although originally council houses, a large portion of the housing stock are now privately owned. The road names are associated with Walter Scott.

== Environment ==
The top and centre of the estate has been left fairly untouched by development meaning that from the approach it appears to have an extensive canopy of green. Greenfaulds is a short walk away from an area of countryside including a stretch of the Luggie Water. It is considered a pleasant retreat for kids, couples, dog owners and horse riders.

== Education ==
Children from Greenfaulds are served by Greenfaulds High School, which was rebuilt, reopening in September 2016. The school provides secondary education for pupils moving up from the feeder primary schools. The area's primary education is served by Woodlands Primary School which originally was named Melrose Primary before it was amalgamated with another nearby primary school, Langlands Primary School in 2000. The area also has another school, Glencryan School which is a state special school for boys and girls aged from 3 to 18 years.

== Transport ==
The area is served by Greenfaulds railway station, which connects through to Glasgow, Hamilton, Coatbridge and Motherwell as well as to Cumbernauld railway station at the south of Cumbernauld and on to Falkirk and Edinburgh.

Bus stations connect through the A8011 road to Glasgow and the Cumbernauld town centre.
