= Allanton, North Lanarkshire =

Coordinates: 55.79°N 03.83°W

Allanton
- Location within North Lanarkshire
- Population: 1,140 (2020)
- OS grid reference: NS8557
- Council area: North Lanarkshire
- Lieutenancy area: Lanarkshire
- Country: Scotland
- Sovereign state: United Kingdom
- Post town: SHOTTS
- Postcode district: ML7
- Police: Scotland
- Fire: Scottish
- Ambulance: Scottish
- UK Parliament: Airdrie and Shotts
- Scottish Parliament: Airdrie and Shotts

Allanton is a village on the A71, in North Lanarkshire, Scotland.

Allanton Colliery was the last colliery to be built and the first colliery to be taken over by the National Coal Board in 1951.

Allanton Primary school was opened in 1927 and a nursery school added in 1999.

Places nearby include Hartwood (1.3 miles/2.1 km), Newmains (2.3 miles/3.7 km), Shotts (2.8 miles/4.5 km) and Wishaw (4.4 miles/7.1 km).

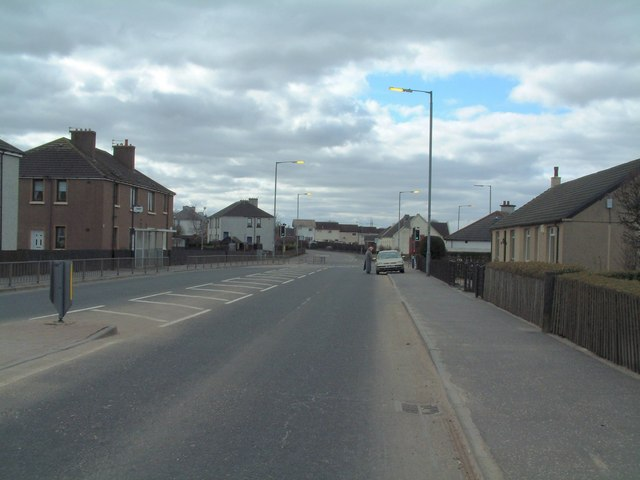
Street in Allanton

== See also ==
- List of places in North Lanarkshire
