= Luggie Aqueduct =

Bridge in East Dunbartonshire, Scotland

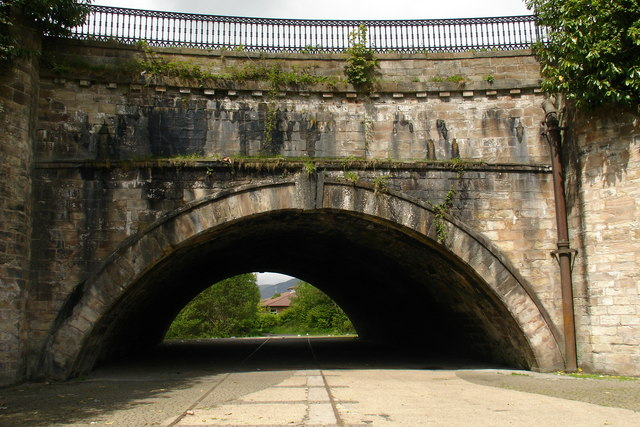
- Coordinates: 55.9397°N 4.1511°W
- Carries: Forth & Clyde Canal
- Crosses: Luggie Water
- Locale: East Dunbartonshire

Listed Building – Category A
- Official name: Luggie Water Aqueduct And Bridge
- Designated: 28 April 1986
- Reference no.: LB36655

Location
- Interactive map of Luggie Aqueduct

The Luggie Aqueduct carries the Forth & Clyde Canal over the Luggie Water at Kirkintilloch, to the north of Glasgow. It is a Category A listed building.

== History ==
It was built by John Smeaton for the Forth and Clyde Canal between 1768-75.

== Design ==
The aqueduct is 37.8 metres (124 ft) long with a single arch span of 13.7 metres (45 ft), and 27.4 metres (90 ft) wide, with a full-width canal that allows two boats to pass.

In 1848, the Campsie Branch line was constructed, and crossed the canal through the arch of the aqueduct but above the water beneath. The railway was carried on a twin-arch culvert to carry the water underneath it. The railway has since been removed, and there is now a footpath beneath the aqueduct but with the lines of the rails still visible. There is an old black and white picture of a boat crossing the canal, with a train passing underneath the boat, with the Luggie flowing below the train.

The sides of the aqueduct are arched, with a rise of about 1 in 10, a feature also employed on the Kelvin Aqueduct. The aqueduct and the bridge below are built from grey ashlar.

== See also ==
- List of canal aqueducts in the United Kingdom
