= Dullatur railway station =

Disused railway station in Dullatur, North Lanarkshire

Coordinates: 55.969854°N 4.012360°W

Dullatur

General information
- Location: Dullatur, North Lanarkshire; Scotland
- Platforms: 2

Other information
- Status: Disused

History
- Original company: North British Railway
- Pre-grouping: North British Railway
- Post-grouping: London and North Eastern Railway

Key dates
- 1 March 1876: Opened
- 5 June 1967: Closed
Location

Dullatur railway station served the village of Dullatur, North Lanarkshire, Scotland from 1876 to 1967 on the Edinburgh and Glasgow Railway.

== History ==
The station opened on 1 March 1876 by the North British Railway. Initially there were no goods facilities but a small yard was later added to the west of the station. Dullatur West signal box, which opened with the station, was to the west. There was another signal box to the east, named Dullator East signal box, which served the sidings of Dullator Quarry and Dullator Sand Quarry. The west box closed in 1933. The station closed on 5 June 1967.

Preceding station	Historical railways	Following station
Castlecary; Line open, station closed	North British Railway; Edinburgh and Glasgow Railway	Croy; Line and station open
