= Luggiebank =

Village in North Lanarkshire, Scotland

Coordinates: 55.930183°N 3.97616°W

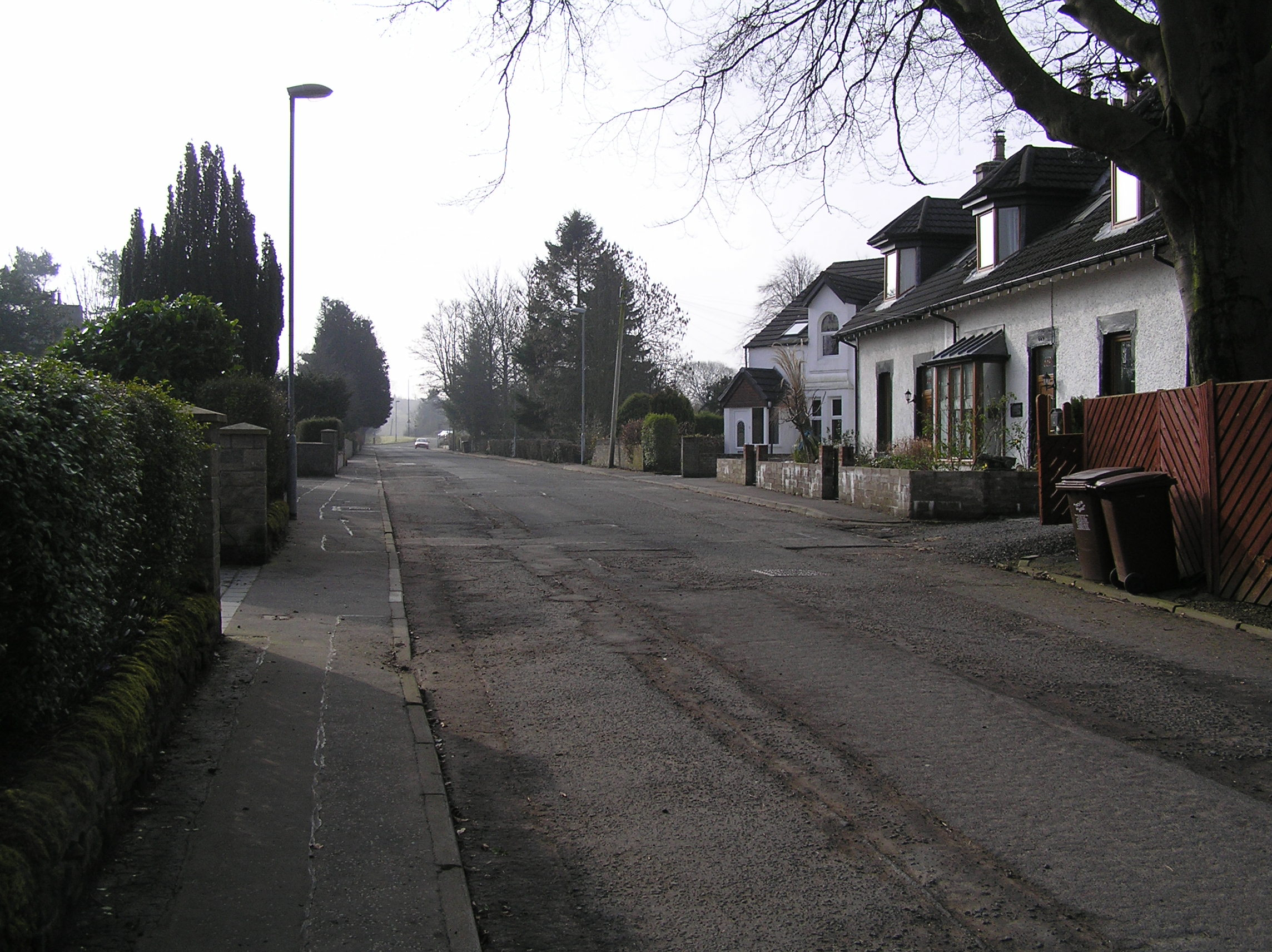
- Luggiebank looking South (2009)

- Location within North Lanarkshire
- OS grid reference: NS765725
- Council area: North Lanarkshire
- Lieutenancy area: Lanarkshire
- Country: Scotland
- Sovereign state: United Kingdom
- Post town: GLASGOW
- Postcode district: G67
- Dialling code: 01236
- Police: Scotland
- Fire: Scottish
- Ambulance: Scottish
- UK Parliament: Cumbernauld, Kilsyth and Kirkintilloch East
- Scottish Parliament: Cumbernauld and Kilsyth; Central Scotland

Luggiebank is a small village to the south of Cumbernauld. Like Condorrat, Castlecary and Dullatur, it predates the new town of Cumbernauld, and of those, only Condorrat was originally included in the designated area. It is situated on what used to be the Stirling Road from Lanark, but as a result of a bypass (B8039) the old road is now a cul-de-sac. Unlike the rest of Cumbernauld, which was in Dunbartonshire, Luggiebank was historically in Lanarkshire, but was adopted into Dunbartonshire in 1967, prior to Cumbernauld becoming a police burgh the following year. Following further boundary changes in 1995, Luggiebank became part of North Lanarkshire and the village became considered part of Cumbernauld for local planning.

Postcard of Stirling Road from around 1925

The village consists of around 30 houses and is essentially built around two streets: the older part of Stirling Road and newer houses on Blairlinn View, named after the farmsteads of Wester, Mid and Easter Blairlinn. Other farms and houses in the surrounding area are deemed to be in Luggiebank. On the south bound side of Stirling Road the houses back onto Luggie Water. The associated glen is now a nature reserve managed by the Scottish Wildlife Trust. The name comes from a cottage of that name which appears on the first Edition of the Ordnance Survey.

In a Scots dictionary, luggie can mean a wooden bucket with handles. An extract from the Ordnance Gazetteer of Scotland 1882 describes The Luggie in less than glowing terms. Two poems by Victorian poet David Gray fondly reminisce upon The Luggie: 'The Dear Old Toiling One' and 'The Luggie'.

The historical village houses are displayed on the north bound side of Stirling Road in the 1864 Ordnance Survey map. People used to go on holiday in the village and there is a postcard looking south, showing the village possibly from the 1930s. The Luggie Bridge, just to the north of the village, is a stone arch that now forms part of the foot way north out of the village.
