= Greenfaulds railway station =

Railway station in North Lanarkshire, Scotland

Greenfaulds Scottish Gaelic: A' Bhuaile Ghlas
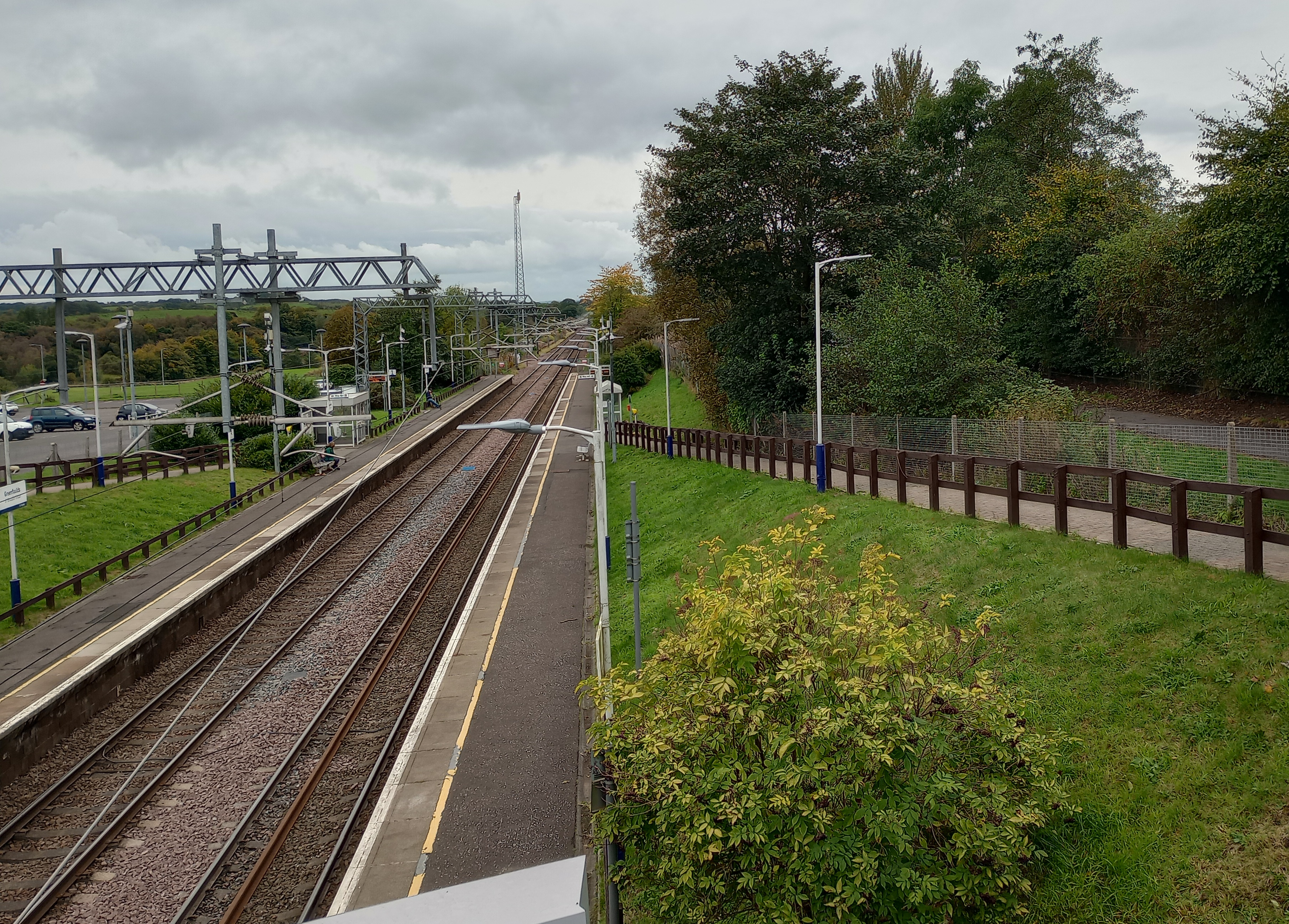

General information
- Location: Greenfaulds, North Lanarkshire; Scotland
- Coordinates: 55.9349°N 3.9937°W
- Grid reference: NS755730
- Manager: ScotRail
- Transit authority: SPT
- Platforms: 2

Other information
- Station code: GRL

Key dates
- 15 May 1989: Opened

Passengers
- 2021/22: ▲55,406
- 2022/23: ▲79,148
- 2023/24: ▲0.113 million
- 2024/25: ▲0.116 million
- 2025/26: ▲0.141 million
Location
Notes
- Passenger statistics from the Office of Rail and Road

Greenfaulds railway station serves the Greenfaulds area of the town of Cumbernauld in North Lanarkshire, Scotland. It is also within walking distance of the Lenziemill industrial estate, the Luggie Water and the Blairlinn industrial estate. The station is managed by ScotRail and is located 13 1/4 miles (21.3 km) north east of Glasgow Queen Street (High Level) on the Cumbernauld Line and is 11 miles (18 km) north of Motherwell railway station on the Motherwell to Cumbernauld Line.

== History ==
The station was opened on 15 May 1989 by British Rail with financial backing from what was then the Strathclyde Passenger Transport Executive. It was on a new site (though the line that serves it is considerably older) and was built as part of the plan to upgrade the Queen Street to Cumbernauld line. The Motherwell service began calling here when it was inaugurated in May 1996.

Lumo services from London Euston to Stirling call here, operated by Class 222s.

== Services ==
Services in trains per hour (tph) are listed below:

=== 2017 ===
The typical service Monday-Saturday is:

- 2 tph to Dalmuir via Glasgow Queen Street Low Level and Yoker
- 1 tph to Dalmuir via Motherwell, Hamilton Central, Glasgow Central Low Level and Yoker
- 1 tph to Glasgow Queen Street High Level
- 4 tph to Cumbernauld, one of which operates to Camelon and Falkirk Grahamston

On Sundays, there is an hourly service in each direction to Cumbernauld and Partick only.

There are also two large park and ride car parks at the station with both being behind the station.

=== 2018/19 ===
From December 2018, a new half hourly Glasgow - Edinburgh via Cumbernauld and Falkirk Grahamston service will start, replacing the hourly DMU service and take over the existing EMU service between Springburn and Cumbernauld. The new service will use new Class 385 EMUs. The service between Cumbernauld and Dalmuir via Motherwell and Glasgow Central will continue to operate with existing stock.

The typical Monday - Saturday service will be:

- 2 tph to Edinburgh via Cumbernauld and Falkirk Grahamston
- 2 tph to Glasgow Queen Street High Level
- 1 tph to Cumbernauld only
- 1 tph to Dalmuir via Motherwell and Glasgow Central Low Level

Preceding station	National Rail	Following station
Gartcosh	ScotRail; Cumbernauld Line	Cumbernauld
Whifflet	Lumo; London Euston to Stirling	Larbert
	Historical railways	
Glenboig; Line open; Station closed	Caledonian Railway; Main Line	Cumbernauld; Line and Station open
