= Castlecary railway station =

Disused railway station in Castlecary, North Lanarkshire

Castlecary

General information
- Location: Castlecary, North Lanarkshire; Scotland
- Coordinates: 55.9812°N 3.9482°W
- Grid reference: NS785781
- Platforms: 2

Other information
- Status: Disused

History
- Original company: Edinburgh and Glasgow Railway
- Pre-grouping: North British Railway
- Post-grouping: London and North Eastern Railway

Key dates
- 21 February 1842: Opened
- 6 March 1967: Closed
Location

Castlecary railway station served the village of Castlecary, North Lanarkshire, Scotland from 1842 to 1967 on the Edinburgh and Glasgow Railway.

== History ==
The station opened on 21 February 1842 by the Edinburgh and Glasgow Railway. To the north was Castlecary Fireclay and Limeworks. To the southeast was the goods yard and the signal box. The signal box closed in 1966 station closed on 6 March 1967. Nothing remains.

== See also ==
- Castlecary rail accidents

| Preceding station | Historical railways | Following station |
|---|---|---|
| Upper Greenhill; Line open, station closed | North British Railway; Edinburgh and Glasgow Railway | Dullatur; Line open, station closed |
