= Auchinstarry =

Coordinates: 55.96°N 04.05°W

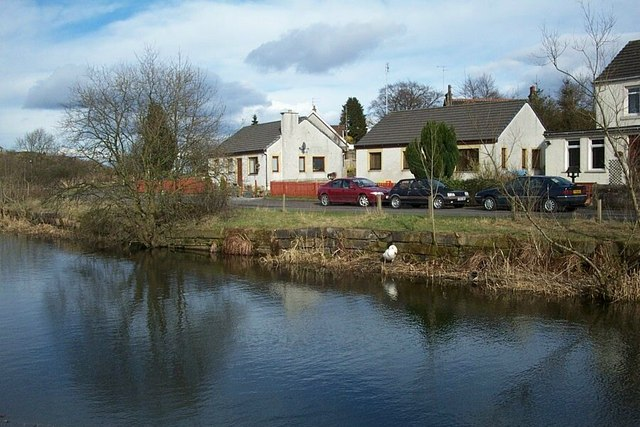
- Forth and Clyde Canal near Auchinstarry

- Location within North Lanarkshire
- OS grid reference: NS7276
- Council area: North Lanarkshire
- Lieutenancy area: Dunbartonshire
- Country: Scotland
- Sovereign state: United Kingdom
- Police: Scotland
- Fire: Scottish
- Ambulance: Scottish
- UK Parliament: Cumbernauld, Kilsyth and Kirkintilloch East
- Scottish Parliament: Cumbernauld and Kilsyth

Auchinstarry is a village in North Lanarkshire, Scotland, UK, near to Kilsyth. It is the site of a Roman fort.

Auchinstarry Basin is on the Forth and Clyde Canal, and a £1.2M regeneration project has created a mooring basin for boats with 56 pontoon berths, a hard standing area for 40 boats, and a customer facilities block, partly funded by British Waterways Scotland. The basin was officially opened in September 2005.

The Environment Advisory Service (EAS), a government agency, has implemented a number of sustainability features at Auchinstarry Basin:

- Deploying recycled materials in all parts of the construction process
- An innovative pump which draws heat from the canal; it is believed that this is the first such use of canal water in the UK
- Plans for installing wind turbines, and a new pub which is self-sufficient in its energy needs

== See also ==
- List of places in North Lanarkshire
