= Airbles railway station =

Railway station in North Lanarkshire, Scotland

Airbles
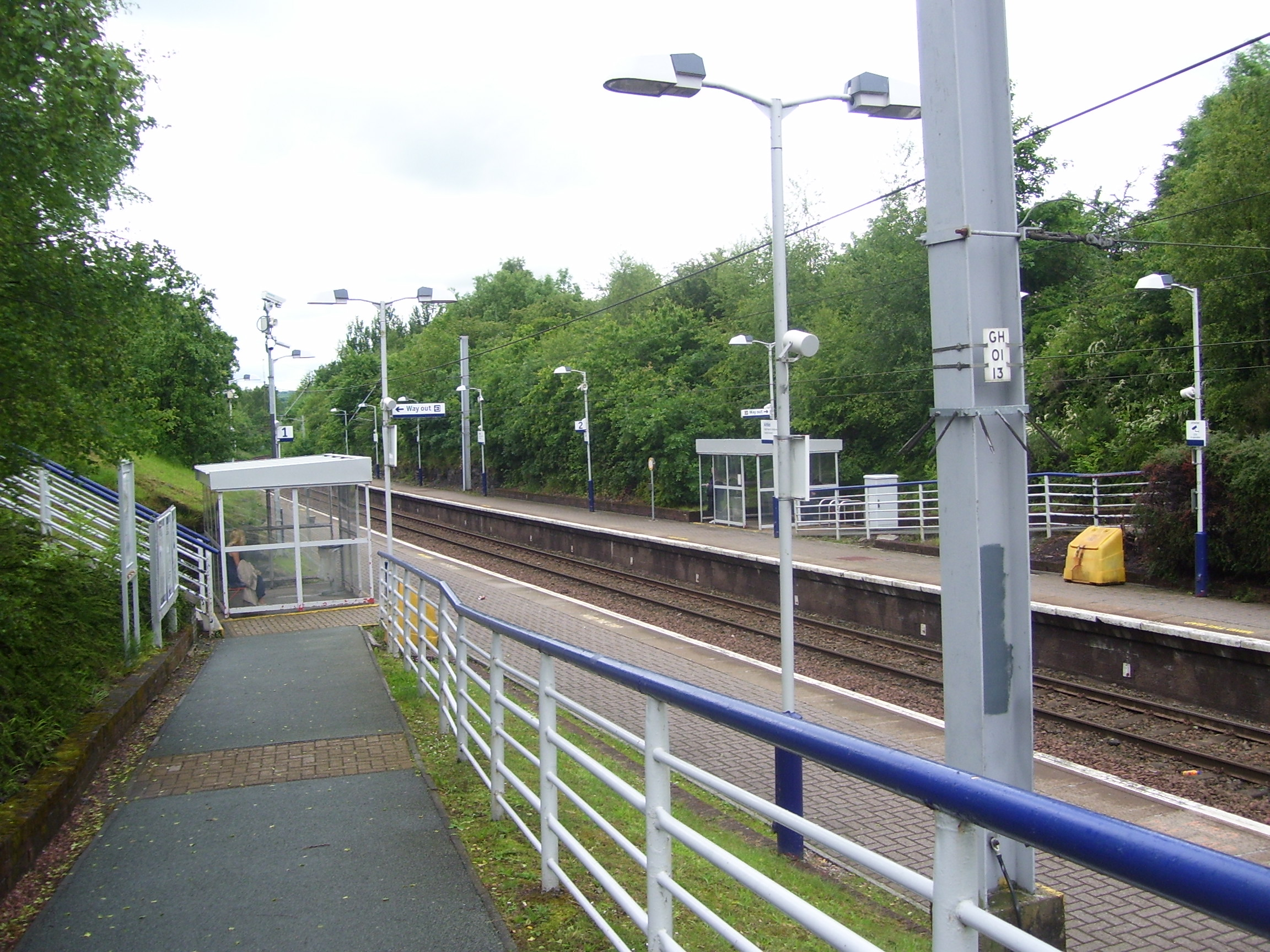

General information
- Location: Motherwell, North Lanarkshire; Scotland
- Coordinates: 55.782331°N 3.994509°W
- Grid reference: NS750561
- Manager: ScotRail
- Transit authority: SPT
- Platforms: 2

Other information
- Station code: AIR

Key dates
- 15 May 1989: Station opened

Passengers
- 2021/22: ▲64,168
- 2022/23: ▲79,500
- 2023/24: ▲0.111 million
- 2024/25: ▼0.110 million
- 2025/26: ▼0.104 million
Location
Notes
- Passenger statistics from the Office of Rail and Road

Airbles railway station serves the Airbles area of Motherwell, North Lanarkshire in Scotland. It is located around 1/2 mile (1 km) away from Fir Park stadium, home of Motherwell F.C.

== History ==
The station was a new construction in 1989 by British Rail, on the Hamilton Circle.

The station missed out on services from the new Larkhall branch because the reopened line connects in a westerly direction as a result of the M74 now being in the location of the previous easterly junction.

== Services ==
=== 2016 ===
The current service pattern, Mondays-Saturdays is:

- 2tph to Dalmuir via Hamilton Central and Glasgow Central Low Level
- 2tph to Motherwell, with an hourly extension to Cumbernauld

The Sunday service is:

- 2tph to Milngavie, via Hamilton and Glasgow Central Low Level
- 2tph to Motherwell

Preceding station	National Rail	Following station
Motherwell	ScotRail; Argyle Line	Hamilton Central
