= Airbles =

Coordinates: 55.782148°N 3.992629°W

Airbles: Scottish Gaelic: Na h-Earbaill
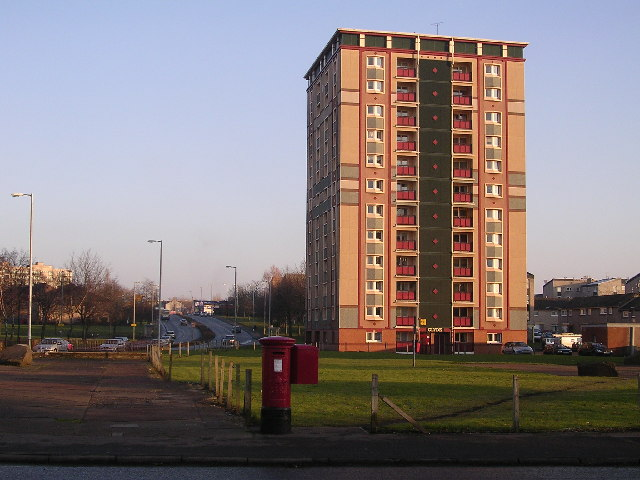
- One of the shorter high-rise blocks in Airbles, next to Airbles Road.

- Location within North Lanarkshire
- OS grid reference: NS751561
- Council area: North Lanarkshire
- Lieutenancy area: Lanarkshire
- Country: Scotland
- Sovereign state: United Kingdom
- Post town: MOTHERWELL
- Postcode district: ML1
- Dialling code: 01698
- Police: Scotland
- Fire: Scottish
- Ambulance: Scottish
- UK Parliament: Motherwell and Wishaw
- Scottish Parliament: Motherwell and Wishaw Central Scotland

Airbles is a small suburb to the south-east of Motherwell, North Lanarkshire, Scotland. It is mainly a residential area, consisting mostly of a mixture of high-rise and low-rise flats. The dual carriageway B754, known as Airbles Road, passes through the suburb, connecting eastern parts of Motherwell and nearby places such as Wishaw to the M74 motorway. In future, the dual carriageway may become a link road between the M74 and the M8. A section of the town park (the Duchess of Hamilton park) and Airbles Cemetery are also located in Airbles.

The suburb is served by Airbles railway station, which opened in 1989, offering services to and from Glasgow Central, lying on the Argyle Line. It is the nearest station to Motherwell landmarks such as the Motherwell Civic Centre and Fir Park Stadium. There were plans to close the station, but nearby residents objected, saying it was a vital transport stop for that area of Motherwell.

In 2017, it was reported that North Lanarkshire Council planned to demolish all the towers in its control over the next 20 years (including nine in Airbles) and replace them with modern housing, due to the rising costs of maintenance as the buildings aged, as well as some of the flats being unpopular and underoccupied.
