= Mollinsburn =

Coordinates: 55.9212°N 4.053°W

Mollinsburn: Scottish Gaelic: Allt a' Mhuilinn
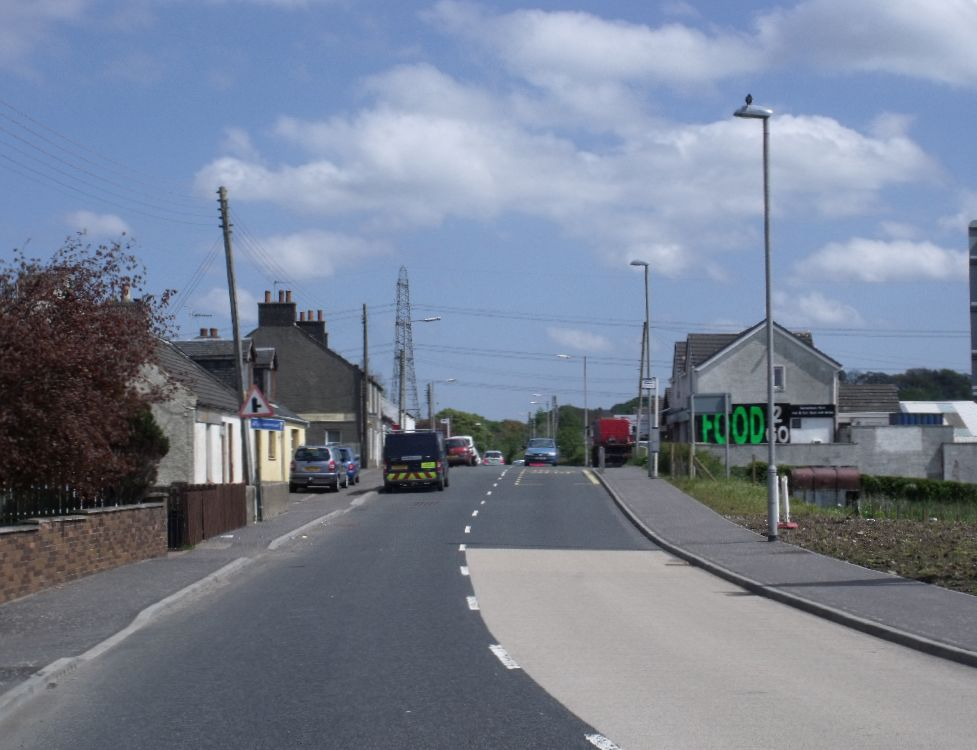
- Main Road, Mollinsburn

- Location within North Lanarkshire
- OS grid reference: NS7195571631
- Council area: North Lanarkshire
- Lieutenancy area: Lanarkshire
- Country: Scotland
- Sovereign state: United Kingdom
- Post town: GLASGOW
- Postcode district: G67
- Police: Scotland
- Fire: Scottish
- Ambulance: Scottish

Mollinsburn is a settlement in the North Lanarkshire area of Scotland. It is situated on the A80 road between Condorrat to the east and Moodiesburn to the west. The population is around 100. It used to be known as Mollinburn and the stream known as Mollins Burn joins the Luggie Water east of the village.

Mollinsburn is south of the Luggie and the M80 and M73 motorways are between the river and the village - the roads converge at that point, resulting in the Mollinsburn name being used frequently in regional traffic reports.

There is a Roman fort at Mollins, 4 kilometers south of the Antonine Wall, which was discovered by aerial photography in 1977. The wall passes a few miles north of Mollinsburn, the nearest forts being Croy Hill and Bar Hill.

The etymology of the name is a semi-translation of ‘Allt a' Mhuilinn’, meaning "burn of the mill".

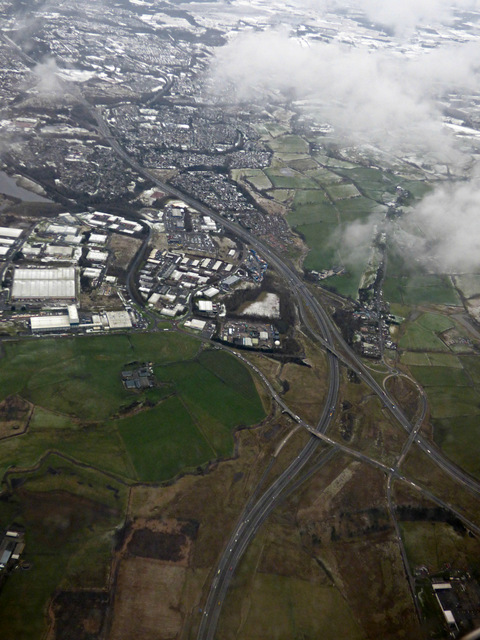
Mollinsburn to the right of the M80. Cumbernauld's Westfield can be seen to the left beside Broadwood Loch
