= Dullatur =

Coordinates: 55.9667°N 4.0167°W

Dullatur: Scottish Gaelic: Dubh Leitir
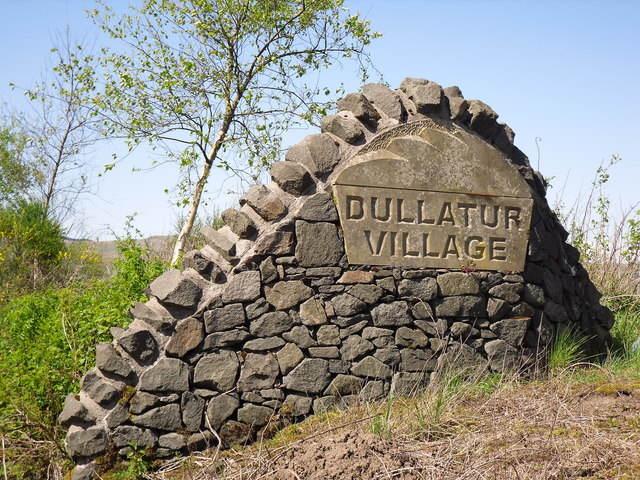

- Location within North Lanarkshire
- Population: 690 (2020)
- Council area: North Lanarkshire
- Lieutenancy area: Dunbartonshire
- Country: Scotland
- Sovereign state: United Kingdom
- Post town: GLASGOW
- Postcode district: G68
- Dialling code: 01236
- Police: Scotland
- Fire: Scottish
- Ambulance: Scottish
- UK Parliament: Cumbernauld, Kilsyth and Kirkintilloch East
- Scottish Parliament: Cumbernauld and Kilsyth

Dullatur (/ˈdʌlətər/) is a village (population 720 (est. 2012)) in Cumbernauld, Scotland. Like Condorrat, Castlecary and Luggiebank, it predates the new town of Cumbernauld, and of those only Condorrat was officially included in the designated area. Its name is anglicised from the Gaelic Dubh Leitir, which means "dark slope". The route of the Antonine Wall passes just to the north of Dullatur. Two Roman temporary marching camps were located at Dullatur between the forts at Croy Hill and Westerwood. The camps have been excavated several times by archaeologists following aerial photography and proposed housebuilding. Both camps have now been built over, and no visible remains can be seen on the ground today. Digital reconstructions of the larger and the smaller of the camps have been created. When building the nearby Forth and Clyde Canal in the 18th century a number of finds were made in Dullatur Bog. Thomas Watson recorded: "a number of swords, pistols, and other weapons were dug out; also the bodies of men and horses, and what seems somewhat marvellous, a trooper, completely armed, and seated on his horse, in the exact posture in which he had perished." It was supposed that the man was escaping the Battle of Kilsyth which is due north of Dullatur Bog.

The development of the village owed much to the creation of the Glasgow-Edinburgh railway line, with a station sited in Dullatur in 1842 to encourage commuters to settle there. Several grand villas were built as part of the original development, two of which were designed by the architect Alexander "Greek" Thomson.

The make-up of the village was of the higher socio-economic class, and early recreational developments included Dullatur Golf Club and lawn-tennis clubs, both of which persist to the present day. Dullatur railway station is now closed but the village still serves as a commuter settlement, with a number of private properties being built over the years.
