= Luggie Water =

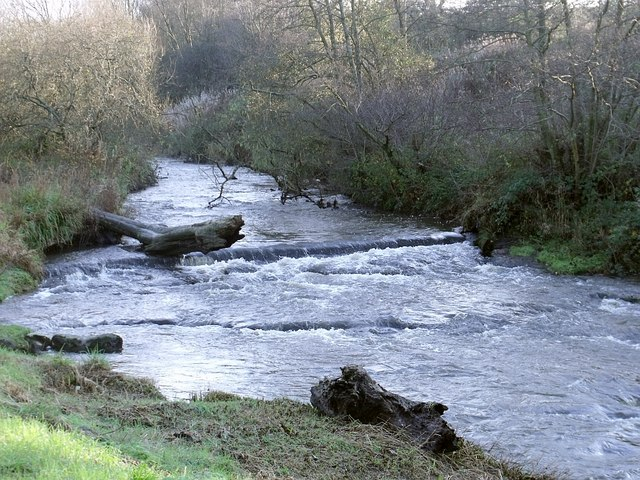
- Luggie at the old ford at Waterside

Location
- Country: Scotland

Physical characteristics
- Mouth: River Kelvin
  - coordinates: 55.94435°N 4.15810°W

The Luggie Water is one of two streams which flow out of Cumbernauld. The Scottish New Town’s name derives from the Gaelic for "the meeting of the waters", which possibly refers to the Luggie Water and the Red Burn, both of which run through Cumbernauld but which never actually meet - tributary burns and drains come within 300 m of one another, but this point is nearly three miles from the original Cumbernauld Village.

Water from the Luggie eventually ends up in the west in the Firth of Clyde via the River Kelvin which joins the Luggie at Kirkintilloch. Water from the Red Burn on the other hand flows northward and then eastward via the Bonny Water and the River Carron into the Firth of Forth. Cumbernauld can be considered the aquatic heart of Scotland, being the urban watershed between East and West in the centre of the Central Belt. Where exactly the Scottish watershed is located in the town is difficult to pinpoint. The catchment of both streams (and the River Avon) includes areas of Fannyside Muir. The Red Burn enters Cumbernauld behind Cumbernauld Academy (formerly Cumbernauld High School), whereas the Luggie Water flows past Luggiebank close to the Greenfaulds railway station. Therefore, anywhere between these two landmarks may be the aquatic heart of Scotland, although their respective sources are a mile or two away on the moor. The Forth and Clyde Canal passes north of Cumbernauld but crosses both the Luggie Water on an aqueduct at Kirkintilloch, and the Red Burn on another aqueduct close to the Castlecary Arches.

The river levels at Condorrat (after the confluence with the Gain Burn) and Oxgang are monitored by SEPA.

For much of its length eastwards from Mollinsburn, Luggie Water formed the historic county boundary between Lanarkshire to the south and Dunbartonshire to the north.

== Toponymy ==
The etymology of the Luggie's name is uncertain. It may originate from the "bright, shining" nature of the stream compared to other local watercourses. Two of Pont's maps mention the Luggie although neither links it with Cumbernauld. Several other old maps show the Luggie with various spellings including maps by Charles Ross, William Forrest, and William Roy.

== The Luggie in Poetry ==
Kirkintilloch poet David Gray (1838–61), wrote many poems which mention the river. "The Luggie" which has been partly narrated, is his most well-known work. The Luggie and Other Poems is his anthology and is online. Some of his many verses which mention the Luggie include a poem about a yellowhammer and this unnamed sonnet:

LONG yearnings had my soul to gaze upon

Fair Italy with atmosphere of fire;

On tawny Spain; on th' immemorial land

Where Time has dallied with the Parthenon

In beautiful affection and desire.

But when last even, effluently bland,

I saw sweet Luggie wind her amber waters

Thro' lawns of dew and glens of glimmering green,

And saw the comeliness of Scotland's daughters,

Their speaking eyes and modest mountain mien,

I blest the Godhead over all presiding,

Who placed me here, removed from human strife,

Where Luggie, in her clear unwearied gliding,

Is but the image of my inner life.

Jim Carruth, poet laureate of Glasgow, has a poem called Watershed which is inscribed on the base of Andy Scott's Arria, The Angel of the 'Naud, statue which overlooks the A80 in Cumbernauld. While it doesn't mention the Luggie by name, the poem, inspired by Cumbernauld's Gaelic name, builds on the theme of watershed to east and west.

== Fauna ==
There have been reports of large mammals including otters, badgers, pine martens, foxes, mink and roe deer along the river. Ornithologists have reported seeing herons and kingfishers too. Eels which swim as far as the Caribbean and back have also been found.

== Source and Tributaries ==
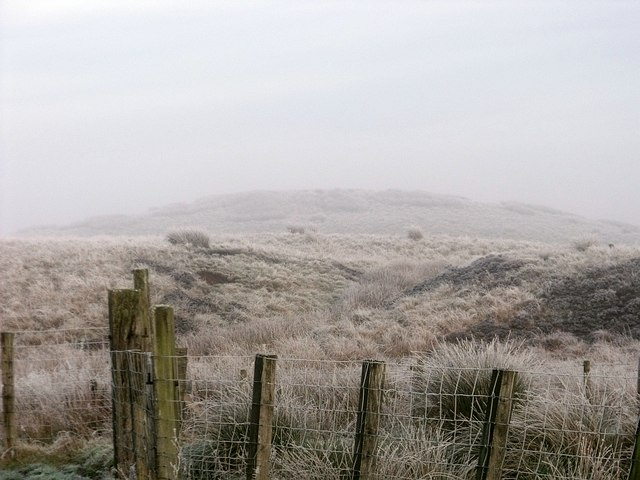
Herd's Hill named after Covenanting lookout man

There would appear to be no single 'source' of the Luggie Water although Herd's Hill on Fannyside is a likely candidate. This very remote location is where the Covenanters used to listen to field preachers despite it being a capital offence. On maps this is at a height of 178 m about 1 km south of the larger Fannyside Loch.

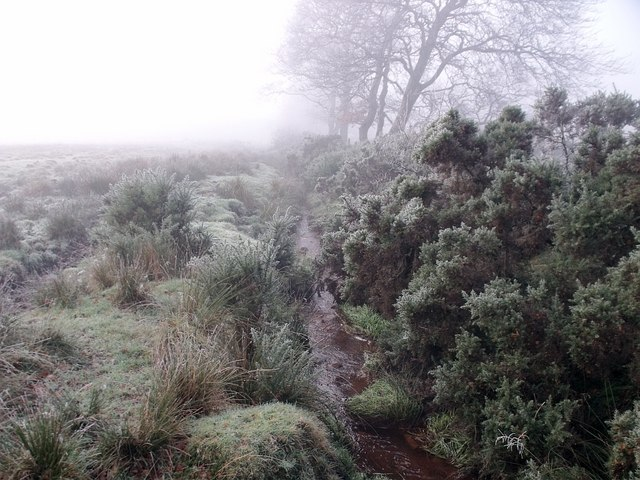
westering burn before Rumblybugs

It's not far from the 10th hole on Palacerigg Golf Course. Within about a kilometer of this point are streams whose waters make it to Linlithgow, Larbert and Kirkintilloch on their way to their destinations.

There is indeed a drainage ditch choked with rushes and containing little moving water to the west of this hill which initially runs in a southerly direction before taking a south west route and thereafter westerly bearing joined by other ditches along the way before it joins with another burn coming from the south at a place called 'Rumblybugs' next to the road between Wester Glentore farm and Cumbernauld. This is very close to the upper reaches of the Avon Water.

The burn from the south - which is the larger of the two contributing streams that make the first notification on maps as Luggie Water after the confluence of the two is in turn an entity also made of drainage ditches from fields to the north east and north of the village of Greengairs. Worries about potential pollution from mining effluent near this source were published in The Herald.

It is therefore difficult to claim a single source for this river and it can be safely assumed as per the Ordnance Survey that the river called the Luggie Water commences at the confluence of its contributaries at Rumblybugs bridge. From this point to the Luggie's confluence with the Kelvin is a distance of approximately 18 kilometres (11 mi) which almost agrees with Groome of the Gazetteer of Scotland. The Gazetteer also states "Fannyside Loch, 2 3/4 miles (4.5 kilometres) southeast of the town, is the only one that has not been drained of several lakes; it is 6 3/4 furlongs (1,350 metres) long and from 1 to 2 furlongs (200 to 400 metres) broad. The new-born Kelvin traces 3 1/4 miles (5 kilometres) of the north-western, and Luggie Water 4 1/2 miles (7 kilometres) of the southern, border; whilst the former throughout is also closely followed by 4 1/2 miles (7 kilometres) of the Forth and Clyde Canal." The preacher Adam Forman suggests Torbrex Farm as the source.

The significant downstream tributary burns after Rumblybugs are in order:

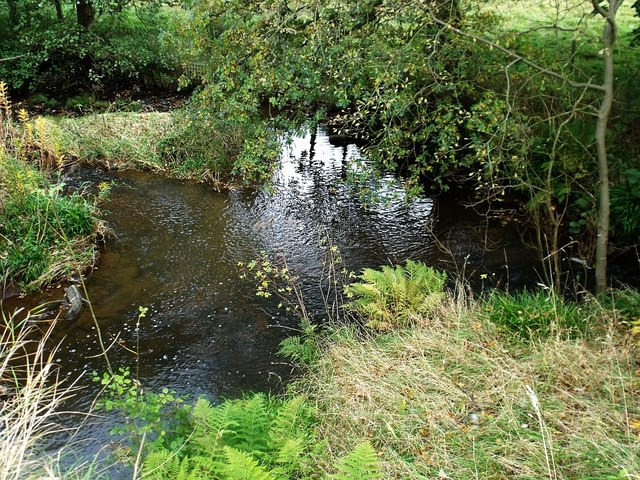
the Luggie (left) and Cameron Burn (from the right) meet next to the bridge at Glenhove

Cameron Burn - Which flows north to join the Luggie at Tannoch bridge, (near Bedlam and the stables), south of Palacerigg Road. The Cameron (historically known as the Kamrõ Burn) would appear to be the larger stream of the two. After Luggiebank the river skirts the edge of Cumbernauld with Lenziemill to the north and Blairlinn to the south.

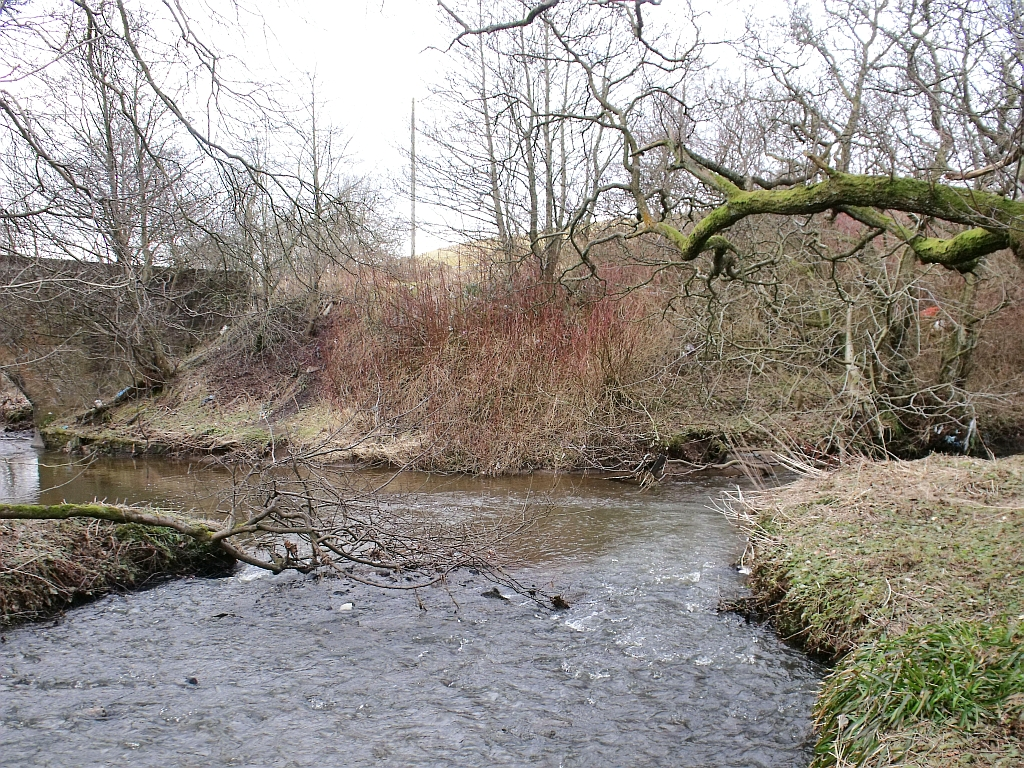
The Shank Burn joins the Luggie

Shank Burn - Another large burn almost as big as the Luggie empties itself into the Luggie from the south near Garngibboch west of both the A73 road bridge and the rail bridge.

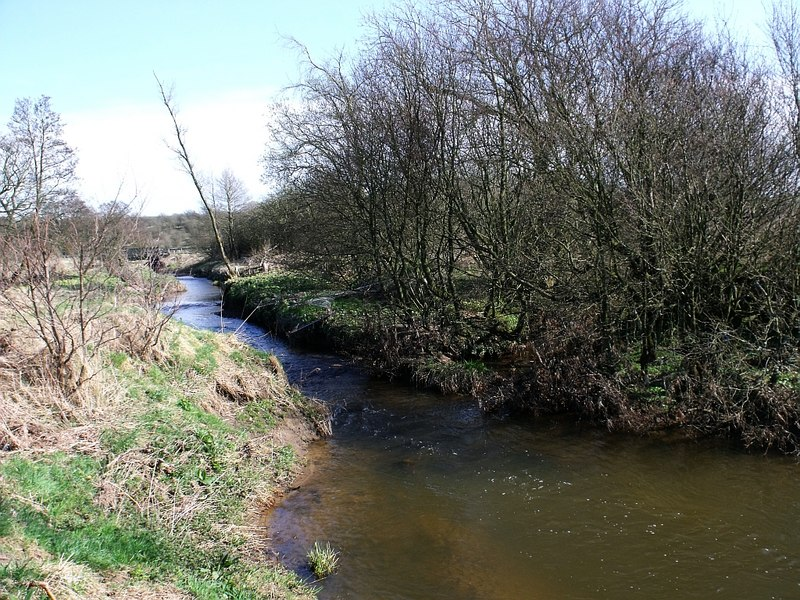
Gain Burn joins with Luggie (on right behind trees. Chapelton bridge can be seen upriver).

Gain Burn - At Auchenkilns Holdings from the south a few hundred metres downstream of Garngibboch Bridge near Cumbernauld Rugby Club's ground. Maps also show another unnamed burn joining the Luggie just after the Gain Burn, coming from Auchinkilns, this is most likely a land drain expanded for the new town house building in the 1960s and 1970s.

Moss Water - From Cumbernauld the Luggie flows past Condorrat, whose name is also from a Gaelic phrase - "Comh Dobhair Alt" - The joint river place. The Luggie Water flows round the southern perimeter of Condorrat where older maps and descriptions seem to show it was joined by the Moss Water. Confusingly, maps show the Moss Water flowing both north and south - when the A80 road was upgraded to the M80 motorway, a SUDS pond was created in the route of the Moss Water. It drains land to the south, and into the Luggie Water, but the SUDS pond itself drains down the original Moss Water and into Broadwood Loch. In 1993 Broadwood Loch, a balancing lake, was created by damming the Moss Water and using a plastic waterproof membrane, and a 6m wall to hold back the water. This was primarily to prevent flooding downstream but also for recreation. The lake is maintained at a nearly constant level and drains northward to the Kelvin via the Board Burn rather than into the Luggie. Modern maps show another balancing pond also exists which does drain south into the Luggie.

Mollins Burn - On the eastern edge of the village of Mollinsburn.

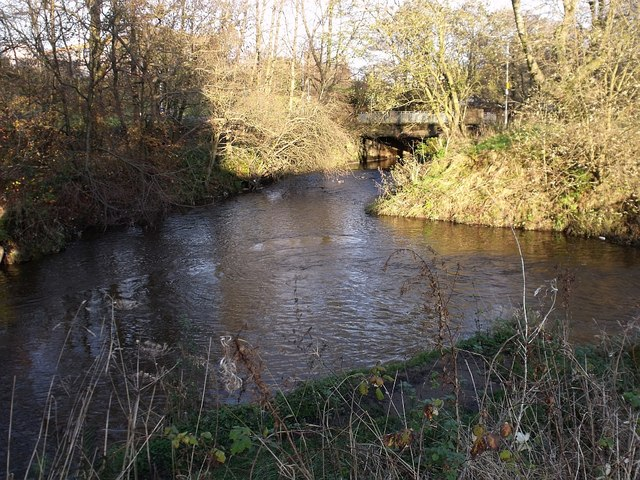
Confluence of Bothlin Burn and Luggie

Bothlin Burn - At Oxgang in Kirkintilloch. The Bothlin escapes from Bishop Loch, south of Gartcosh. It is joined by the Garnkirk Burn east of Davidston farm. The Bothlin is without a doubt the Luggie's major contributing stream. Its source the Bishop loch was a third larger in area than it is today and this is a result of the Forth & Clyde Canal Company buying the water rights and using it as a storage reservoir to supply the canal at Kirkintilloch via the Bothlin. This was done by a canal feeder drawing water from the burn near Claddens by way of a weir and sluice. As it flows through Kirkintilloch it is crossed by an aqueduct [1] that carries the Forth & Clyde Canal. After this it is but a short distance until it meets the smaller River Kelvin.

Despite Groome's recorded opinion in the Ordnance Gazetteer of Scotland (available online) as a "dull, sluggish, ditch-like stream", there is more beauty to the banks of the Luggie than he saw, for his tardy comments must exclude the stretch of the river through the beautiful glen at Luggiebank and the meanders along its shallow glen west of Mollins.

== Bridges, Viaducts and other Landmarks ==
There are many man-made structures along the watercourse. Some give aesthetic pleasure although others are largely functional. There are road, rail and footbridges as well as viaducts, and weirs along the length of the Luggie and its tributaries. For example at the site of the old mill at Lenziemill there is the ruins of a weir. It looks like a natural waterfall but it raised the water level in order to supply the mill lead to Lenzie corn and flax mills. Some of the isolated spots attract youths who enjoy local tonics or practise their art. There are remnants of another weir near Dalshannon Farm at Condorrat, which diverted water to the nearby Wood Mill, the lade having been filled in with soil from the levelling of the road for the construction of Gainburn Crescent - named for the Luggie's tributary the Gain Burn.

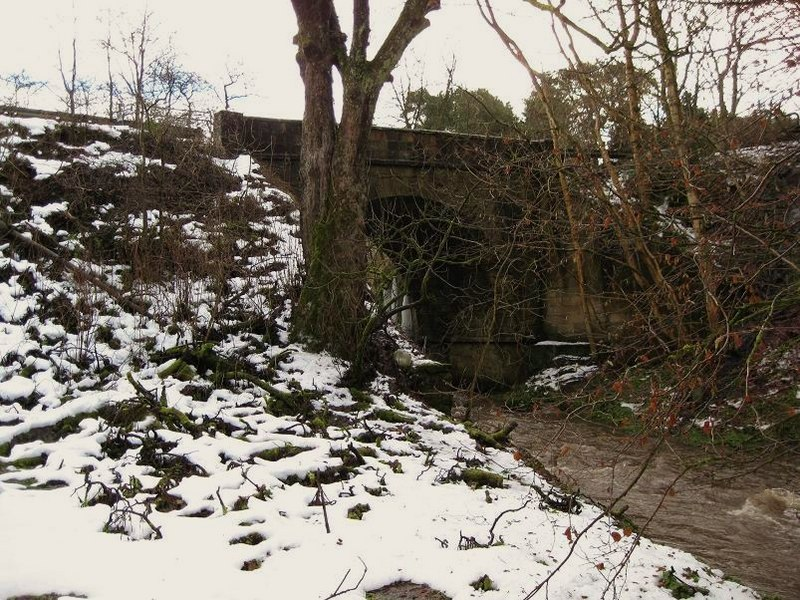
The Auld Bridge, Luggiebank, designed by Thomas Telford

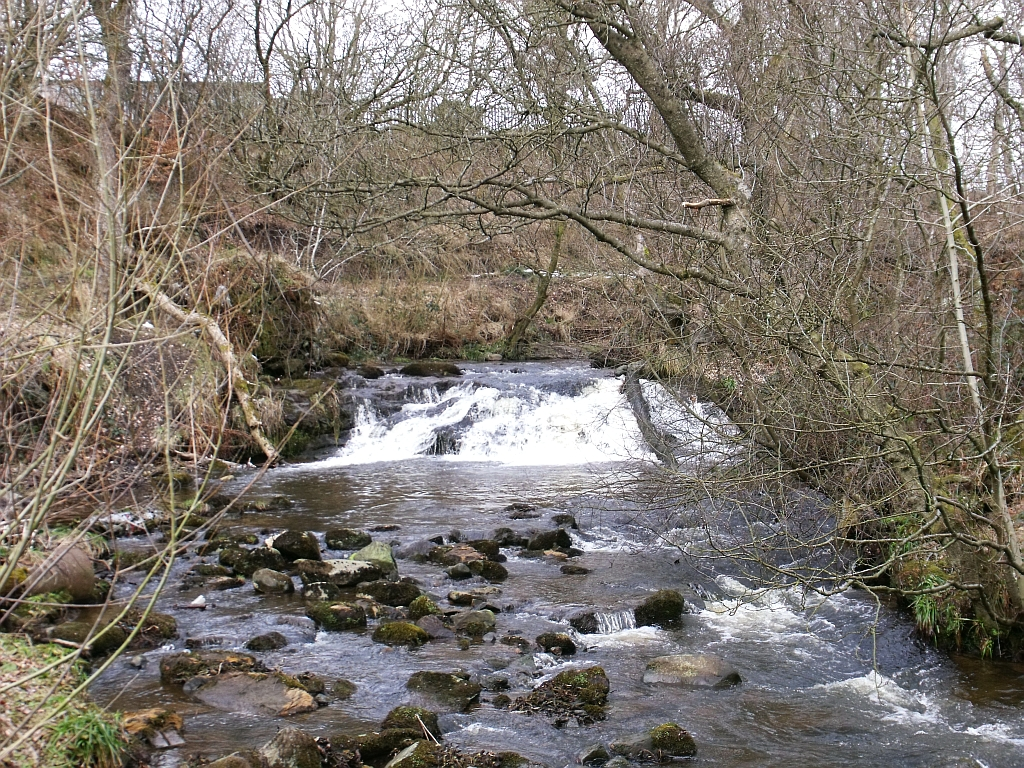
Old weir at Lenziemill

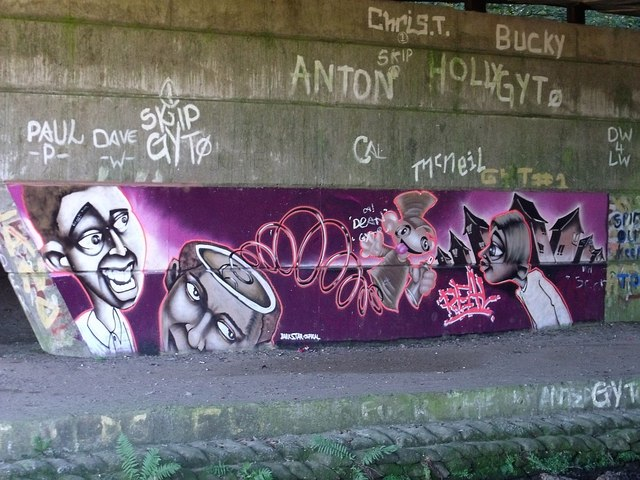
Artistic Urban Graffiti under the A73

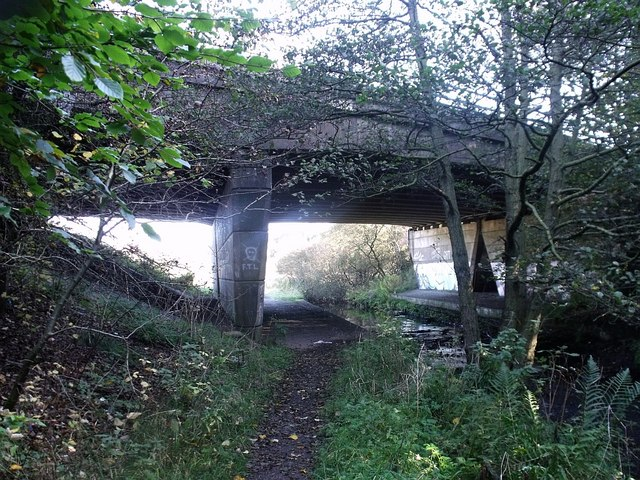
A73 Bridge - looking upriver on the right

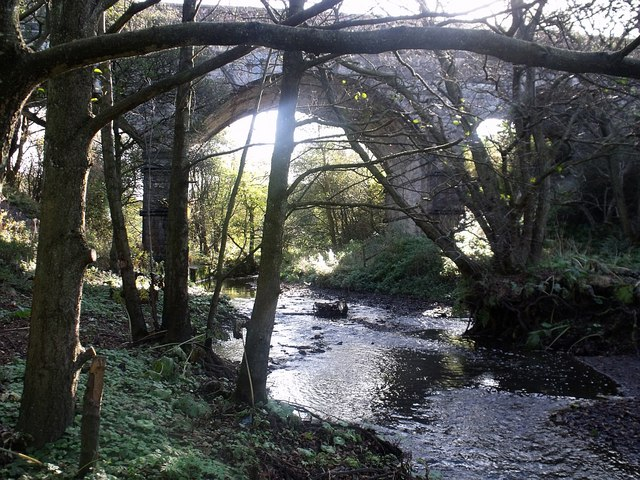
Railway bridge at Garngibboch near Greenfaulds

Some parts of the river have problems with shopping trolleys and old mattresses and the like just dumped in the river. Volunteers like some Luggiewatch members from Kirkintilloch sometimes give up their free time to help with this problem. Other structures are more poignant like the memorial at Kirkintilloch to a young man, Hazleton Robert Robson, who at the age of 17 drowned in the Luggie Water whilst attempting to save the life of a young child.

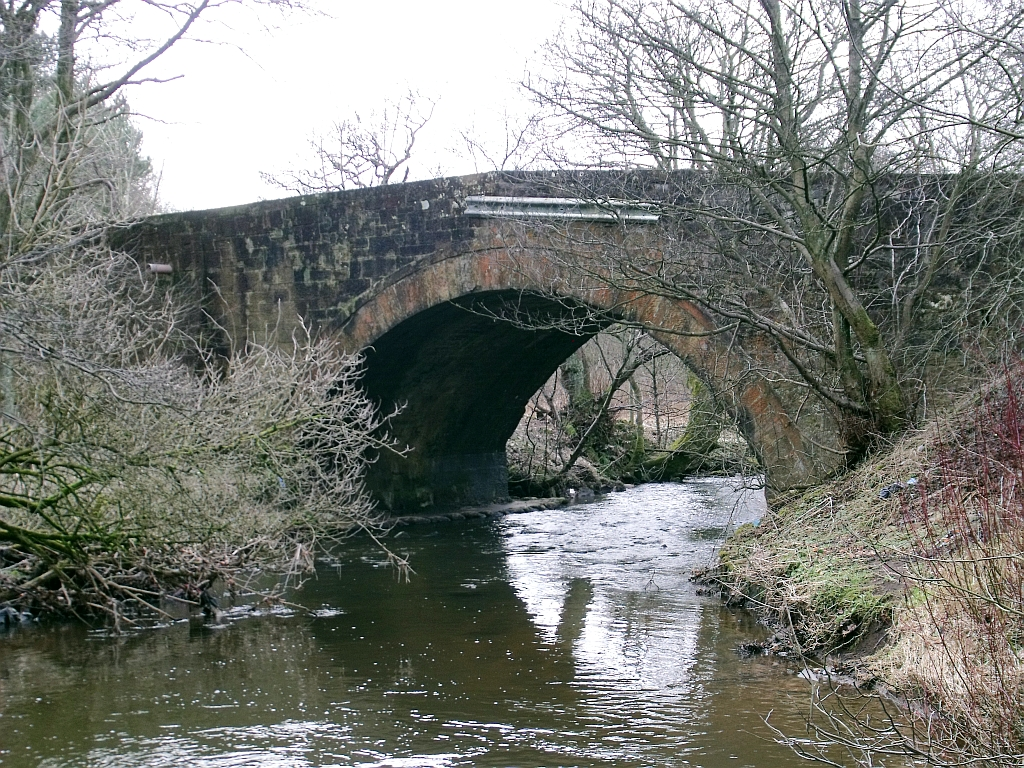
Garngibboch Road Bridge

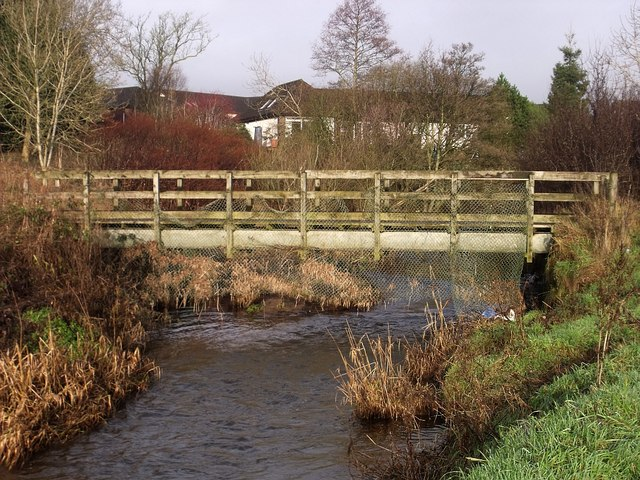
wooden footbridge near Summerfield Road, Dalshannon

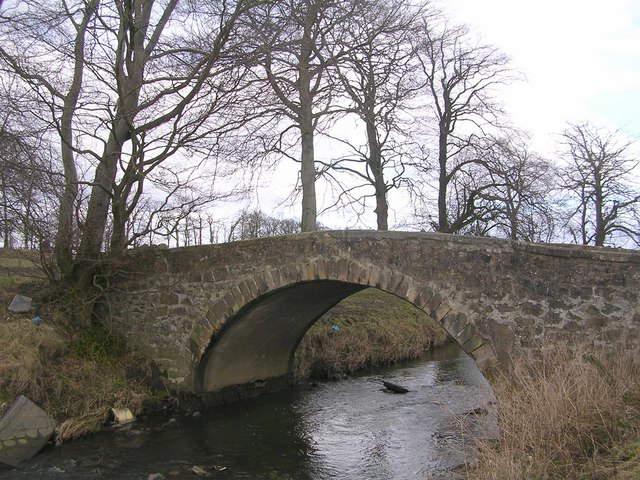
mattress by Bridge at Gartshore Road near Sauchenhall

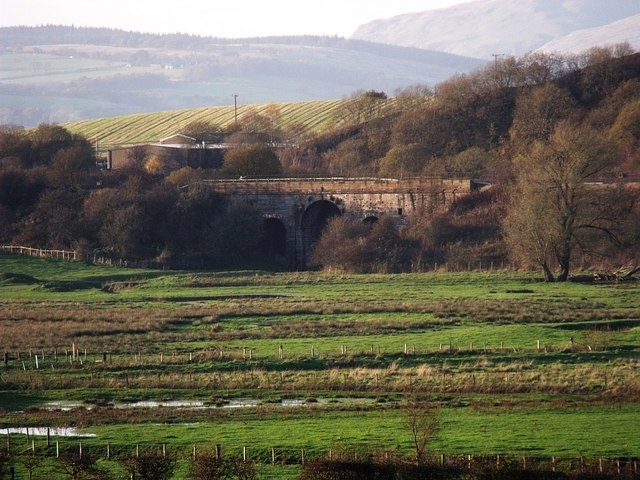
Railway viaduct at the Waterside Bing

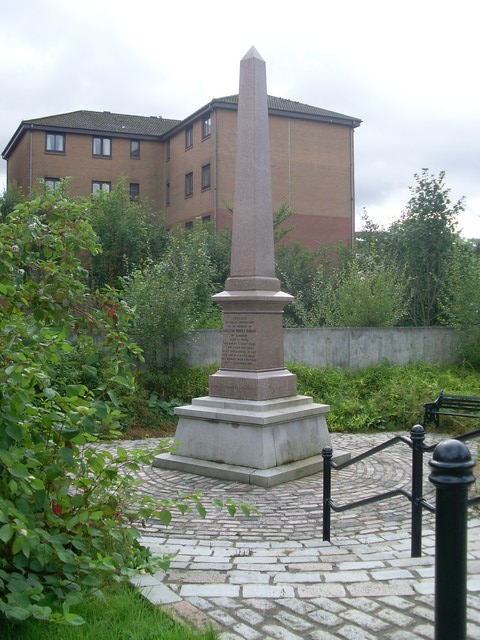
Memorial at Eastside, Kirkintilloch

== No Connection ==
There is another watercourse in the area of Coatbridge called the Luggie Burn, a tributary of the North Calder Water. Jane Lindsay from Cumbernauld, who was found murdered on nearby Fannyside Moor in 1880, had been known as "Luggie Jean" in life on account of a deformity which gave the impression of her having an extra ear; it was coincidence that she was killed near the stream of the same name.
