= Blairlinn =

Industrial estate in Cumbernauld, Scotland

Coordinates: 55°55′49″N 3°59′15″W

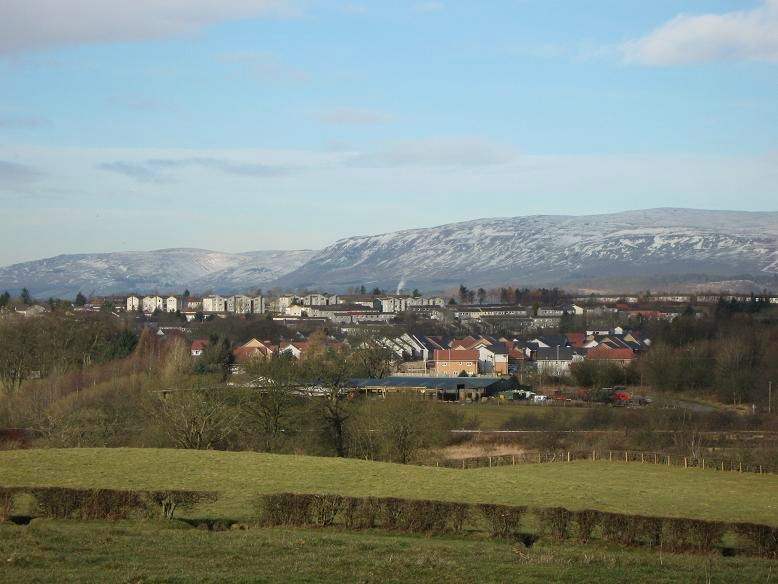
View from historic Wester Blairlinn Farm towards Condorrat and the Campsie Fells

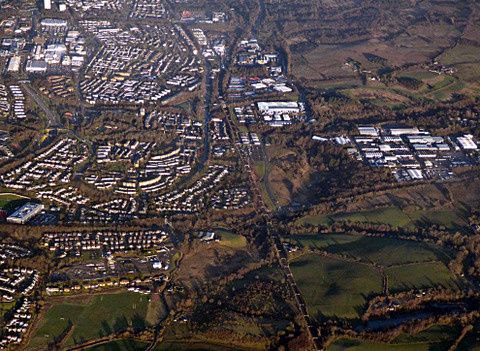
Lenziemill is to the right of the railway line with the park and ride at Greenfaulds Railway Station. Blairlinn is to the far right over the Luggie

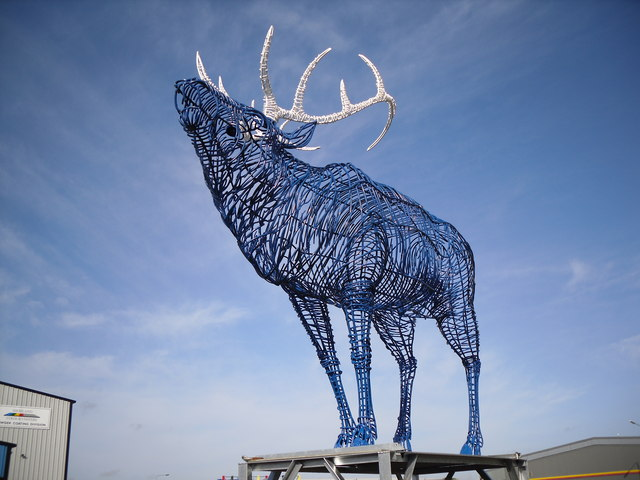
Stag – formerly at the entrance to Blairlinn Industrial Estate but now fenced in for its protection by the Highland Colour Coaters

Blairlinn is the site of one of Cumbernauld's several industrial estates built as satellite developments on the periphery of the Scottish town's residential areas.

== Toponymy ==
The etymology of the name is probably 'Pool, or mill-dam, plain’ (blàr linne).

== Modern Estate ==
The modern industrial estate is about a mile south of the town centre. It was opened as Blairlinn Industrial Estate by the Secretary of State for Scotland on Friday, 22 September 1961. In 1962 Telehoist was one of the first companies to set up there. Some of the early factories were about 22,000 square feet with room for enlargement.

Large companies using the estate include Farmfoods, Dreams, and Mackintosh. There are over 20 other companies in the complex.

North of the estate is a steep glen through Luggiebank Wood which is now a nature reserve managed by the Scottish Wildlife Trust.

== History ==
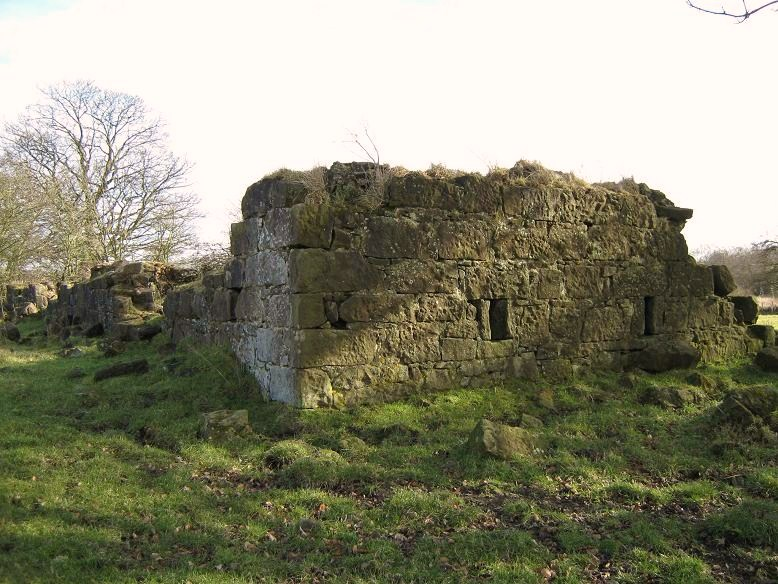
West Blairlinn Farm (ruin)

Before the building of the new town, there were three farmsteads known as Wester, Mid and Easter Blairlinn. All three were south of the Luggie Water with Wester Blairlinn near the east bank of the Shank Burn and Easter Blairlinn near the west bank of the Cameron Burn. Mid Blairlinn and Easter Blairlinn are reported to have had some coal within 900 feet of the surface. There seems to have been an old flax mill at Pettycastle, West Blairlinn. It is shown as a ruin on the first edition of the six inch ordnance survey map of Lanarkshire. Several other old maps show Blairlinn with various spellings including maps by Charles Ross, William Forrest, and William Roy.

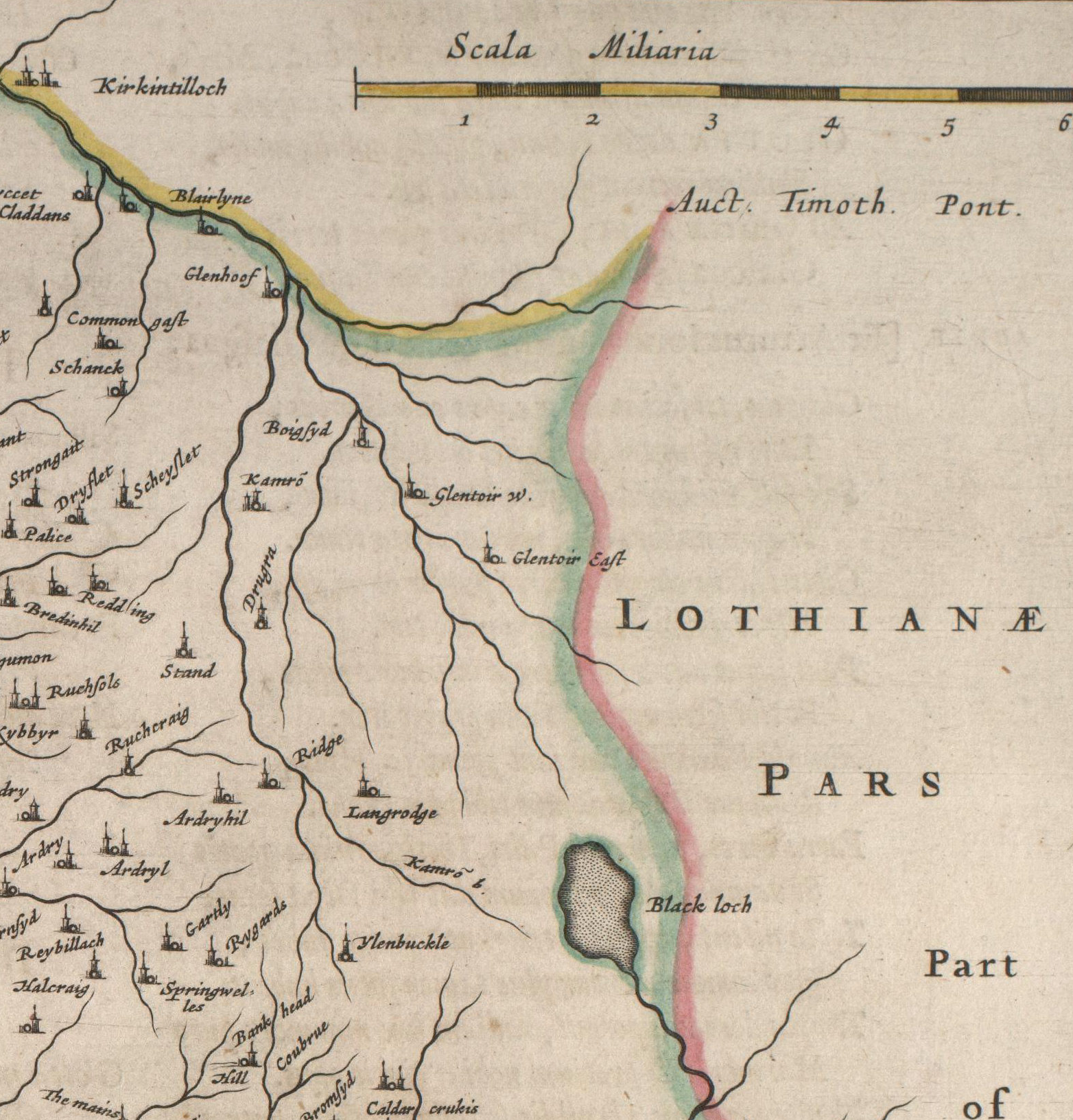
Blaeu's map based on Pont's original "Glasgow and the county of Lanark" map c.1596 depicting Blairlyne (Blairlinn) between the Schanck (Shank Burn) and Kamrõ (Cameron Burn)
