= Condorrat =

Area of Cumbernauld, Scotland

Coordinates: 55.936°N 4.019°W

Condorrat: Scottish Gaelic: Con Dobharait
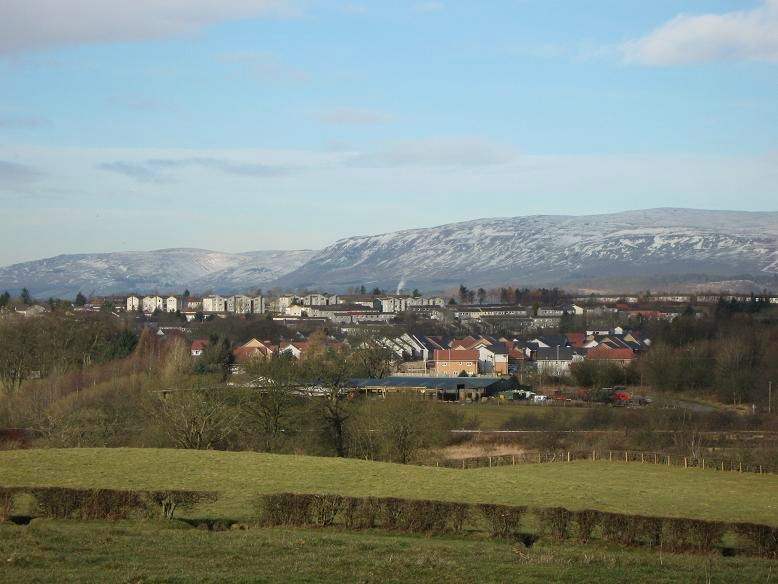
- View from historic Wester Blairlinn Farm towards Condorrat and the Campsie Fells

- Location within North Lanarkshire
- OS grid reference: NS739733
- Council area: North Lanarkshire
- Lieutenancy area: Dunbartonshire
- Country: Scotland
- Sovereign state: United Kingdom
- Post town: GLASGOW
- Postcode district: G67
- Dialling code: 01236
- Police: Scotland
- Fire: Scottish
- Ambulance: Scottish
- UK Parliament: Cumbernauld, Kilsyth and Kirkintilloch East (UK Parliament constituency)
- Scottish Parliament: Cumbernauld and Kilsyth

Condorrat is a former village in North Lanarkshire, Scotland. Like Luggiebank, Castlecary and Dullatur, it predates the new town of Cumbernauld, but unlike those Condorrat was officially included in the designated new town area. Since then it has officially been part of Cumbernauld although it retains some of its own distinctive character. Dalshannon Farm and cottages were located in the area west of the original town and farm, and north of the Luggie. So also was a corn mill called Wood Mill. Road signs show they are now in the western part of Condorrat towards Mollinsburn.

Condorrat now has many of its own facilities, including a health centre, three primary schools and a library.

== Governance ==
Up until 1975, Condorrat sat within Cumbernauld Burgh and Dunbartonshire County. Upon Local Government re-organisation in 1975 it found itself part of Cumbernauld & Kilsyth District Council and Strathclyde Regional Council. Finally, in 1995, it was placed within the boundaries of the newly created North Lanarkshire Council.

== History ==
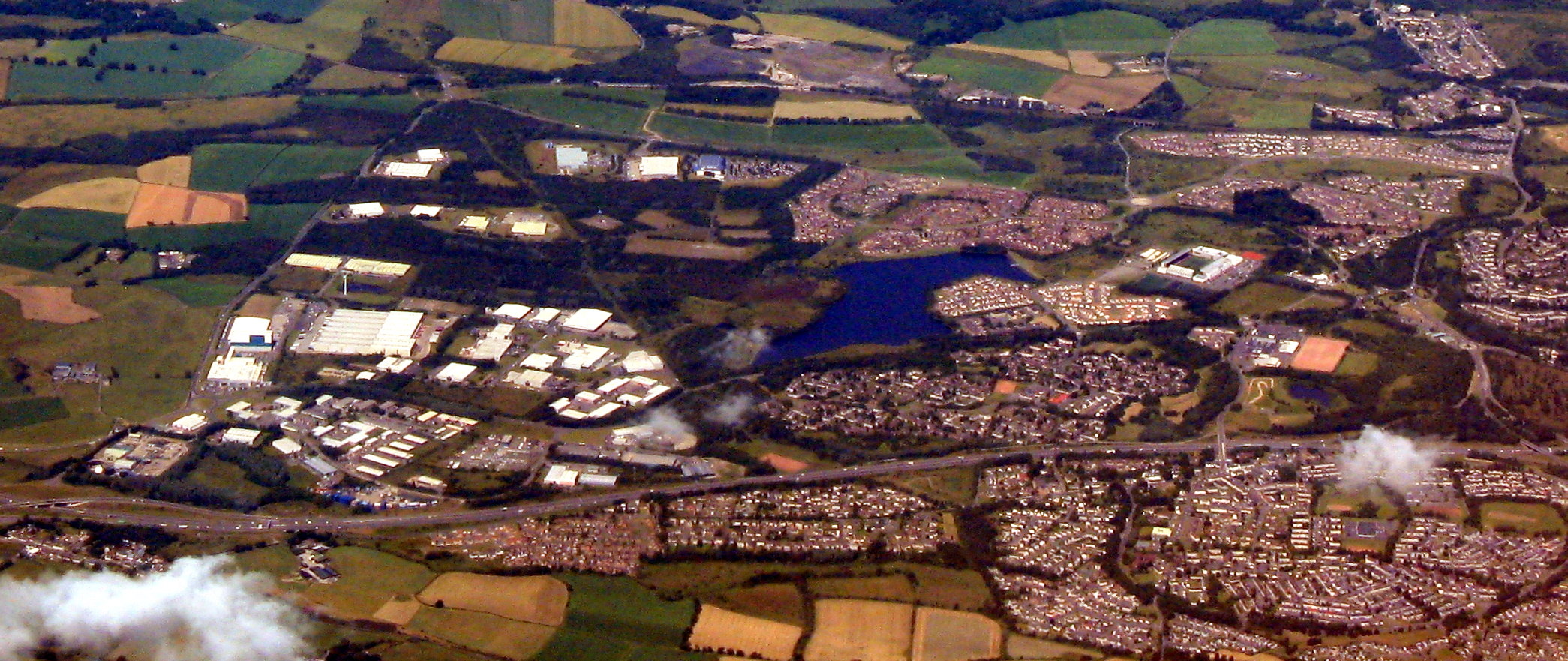
Condorrat (bottom right) and Dalshannon below the M80

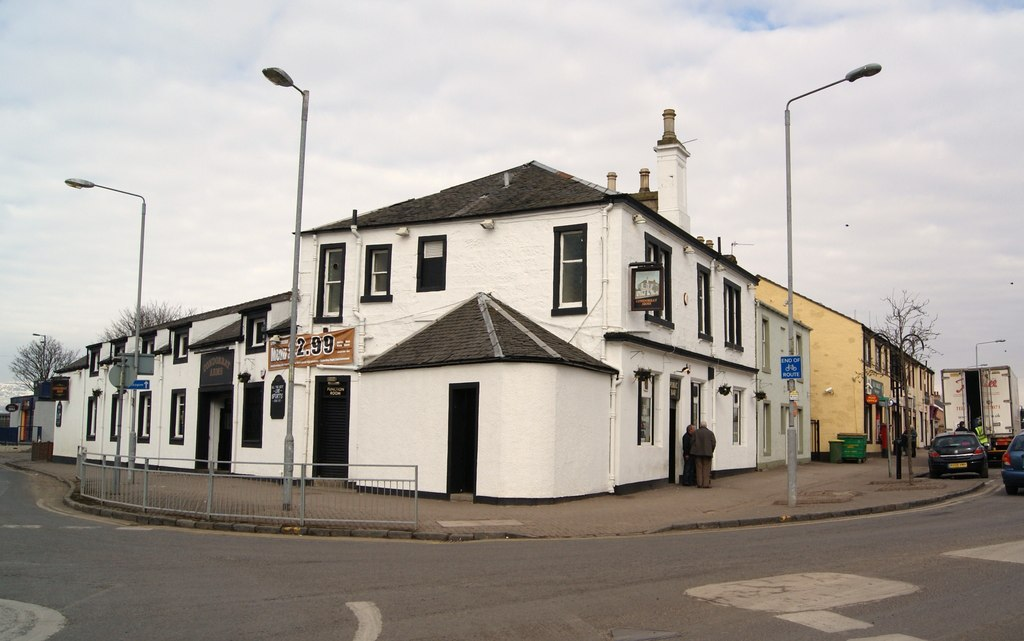
Condorrat Arms (now Broden's) and Main Road Shops

The name Condorrat is from the Gaelic "Comh Dobhair Alt" - The joint river place. The Luggie Water flows round the southern perimeter of Condorrat where older maps seem to show it was joined by the Moss Water. This is probably the meaning of the phrase. (In 1993 Broadwood Loch, a balancing lake, was created by damming the Moss Water and using a plastic waterproof membrane, and a 6 m wall to hold back the water. This was primarily to prevent flooding downstream but also for recreation).

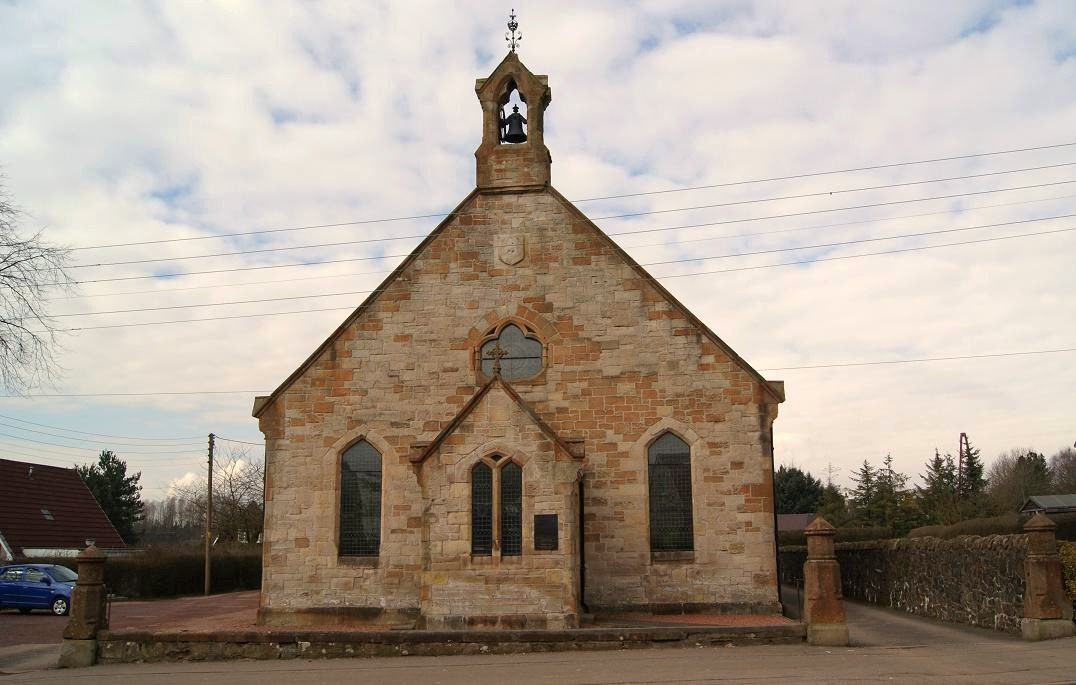
Condorrat Parish Church

The settlement pre-dates 1649, as Groome's Ordinance Gazetteer of Scotland states "The parish, containing also the village of Condorrat, was disjoined from Kirkintilloch in 1649, under the name of Easter Lenzie." The same publication also states that Condorrat is a quoad sacra parish in Cumbernauld parish, Dunbartonshire, 2 and 3/4 miles southwest of Cumbernauld Village and 6 miles north-northwest of Airdrie, under which, it has a post office. An Established church built here in 1875, contain 400 sittings, and cost, with a manse, £2,600. Pop (1891) 607 of q.s. parish, 1596."

Condorrat was a weaving community, and some of the early single-storey houses still exist in the row known as Braehead Cottages, now much modernised. At the west end of the town is Dalshannon Farm, which is a very good example of a long house of the 17th century. The longhouse has since been raised in height and a 2-storey block added to the north-west corner. The building is an Indian restaurant and bar.

Over the past few decades it has been subsumed by the new town of Cumbernauld. In fact Cumbernauld new town was built around older settlements at Condorrat and Cumbernauld Village.

== Notable people ==
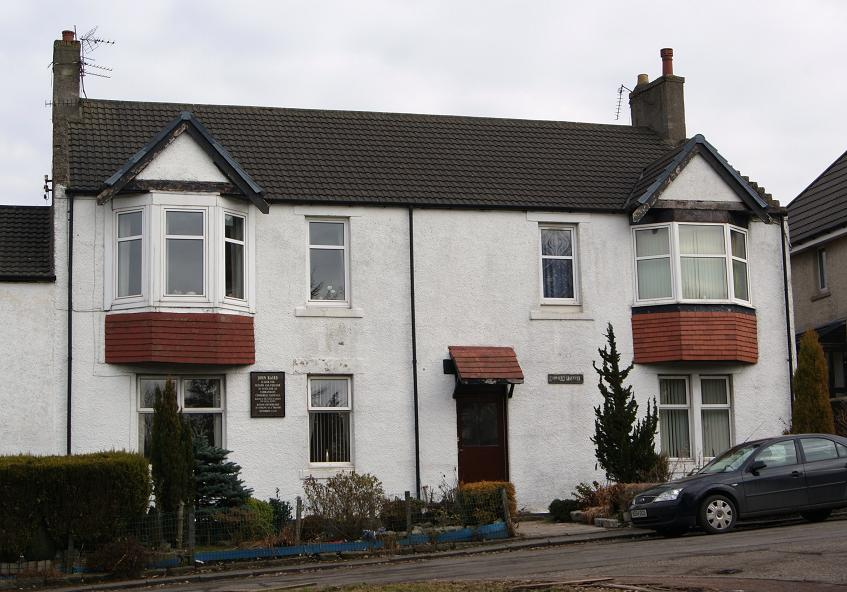
John Baird's House

Condorrat is the birthplace of the 19th century revolutionary John Baird, a leading participant and radical commander in the Radical War of 1820 who was subsequently executed. A plaque is mounted outside the house in which he was born (Airdrie Road). Eventually, on 10 August 1835 an absolute pardon was granted to Baird and to the four local weavers who had been convicted and sentenced to transportation to the penal colonies.

In 2011 a memorial wall was erected in the village commemorating three groups of local people: those who were executed or sentenced to transportation for participating in the Radical War, the six local men who were killed (alongside 41 others) in the Auchengeich mining disaster in 1959 and for all those local people who had lost their lives in conflict throughout the world.
