= Lenziemill =

Industrial estate in Cumbernauld, Scotland

Coordinates: 55°56′13″N 3°59′09″W

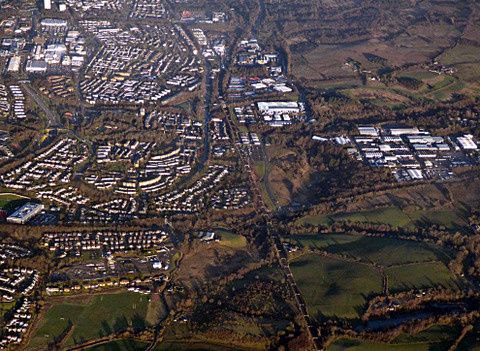
Lenziemill is to the right of the railway line with the park and ride at Greenfaulds Railway Station. Blairlinn is to the far right over the Luggie.

Lenziemill is the site one of Cumbernauld's several industrial estates, built as satellite developments on the periphery of the Scottish town's residential areas.

== Toponymy ==
The etymology of the name is uncertain but may distinguish the mill here in ancient Easter Lenzie from a nearby flax mill at Pettycastle in Blairlinn in the parish of Old Monklands.

== History ==
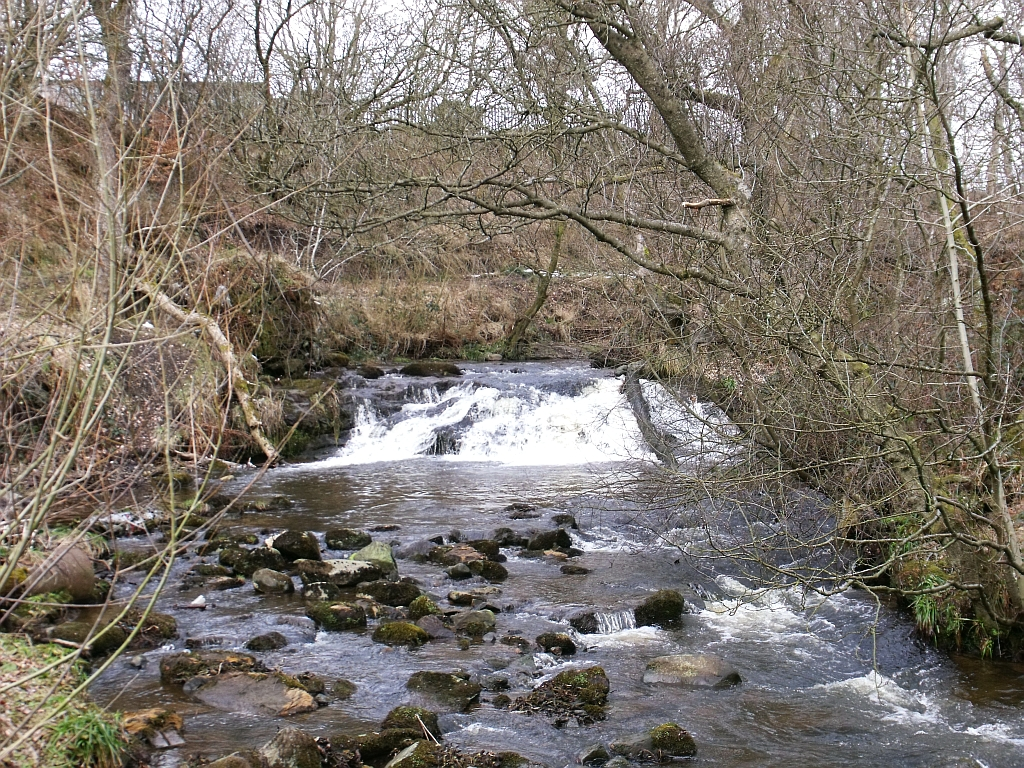
Old weir on the Luggie which powered the corn mill mapped at Linzey Mill

Several other old maps show Lenzie Mill with various spellings including maps by William Forrest, and John Thomson. There used to be a corn mill which was powered by water from the Luggie.

== Modern Estate ==
There are several roads on the estate, several branching from Lenziemill Road which is 12 miles from Glasgow and 30 miles from Edinburgh. Companies include Cube Glass Limited, R & S Plant Limited, Dow Waste Management, Elite Print Services, Suresafe Protection Limited, The Artificial Grass Company Scotland Ltd, Thermashield Windows & Maintenance Limited, and Bathroom And Tiles Direct Ltd.

Near of the estate is a steep glen through Luggiebank Wood which is now a nature reserve managed by the Scottish Wildlife Trust. Lenziemill is split into West and East by Jane's Brae.
