= Whitelees =

Area of Cumbernauld, Scotland

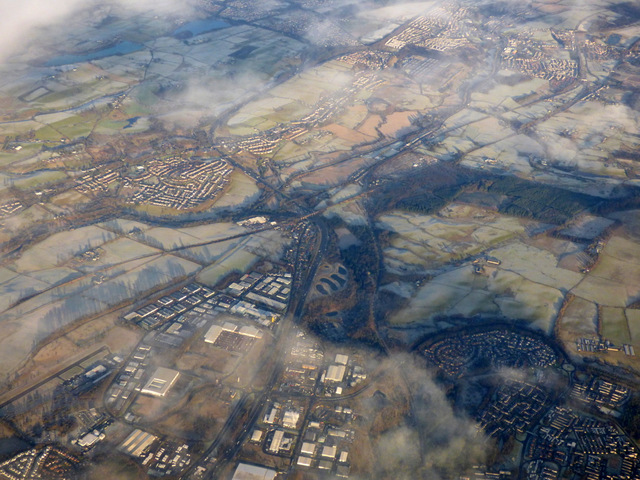
- Whitelees from the air. The canal crosses the picture bottom left to top right (west to east). The railway is just below it with the white roofs of the CMS buildings at Castlecary between them. The Red Burn (SUDS) ponds can be seen south of the Arches which are just visible. Cumbernauld's Wardpark can be seen being divided by the M80 as it heads north towards Stirling. At the bottom left the edge of Westerwood can be seen below Cumbernauld Airport. At the bottom, the small white T-shaped building is the Old Inns petrol station which separates Castlecary Road from the M80. The curve of Forest Road round Whitelees and Whitelees Roundabout, near Kilt Farm, which divides it from Abronhill are at the bottom right. North of Castlecary, Banknock can be seen on the left extending towards Longcroft and Dennyloanhead with Denny and Bonnybridge at the top right.
- OS grid reference: NS787766
- Council area: North Lanarkshire
- Lieutenancy area: Dunbartonshire
- Country: Scotland
- Sovereign state: United Kingdom
- Post town: GLASGOW
- Postcode district: G67
- Dialling code: 01236
- Police: Scotland
- Fire: Scottish
- Ambulance: Scottish
- UK Parliament: Cumbernauld, Kilsyth and Kirkintilloch East (UK Parliament constituency)
- Scottish Parliament: Cumbernauld and Kilsyth

Whitelees is an area of in the north-east of Cumbernauld, North Lanarkshire, Scotland. It is about a two and a quarter miles from Cumbernauld Town Centre. It lies between Abronhill and Wardpark South.

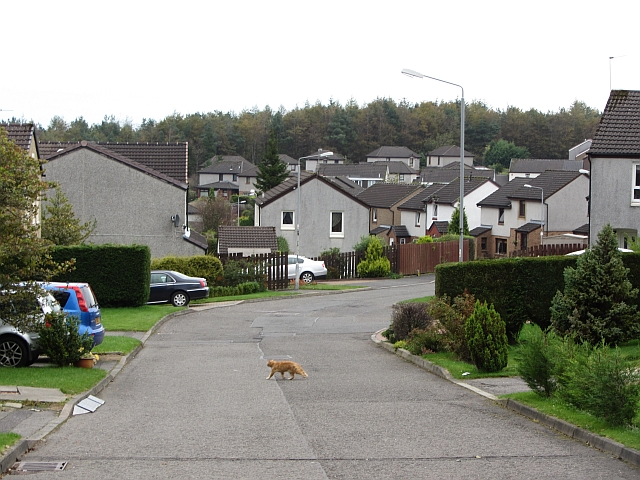
Birkenburn Road

In the history of the new town it was a distinct area from Abronhill. However in common with Ravenswood near Seafar the name of the larger, more signed area has tended to be used far more often. The line of demarcation is at the Whitelees Roundabout, south of which, Abronhill's roads take the names of trees. Houses in Whitelees tend to be in private hands making Whitelees blue on the SIMD map of Scotland. Whitelees is skirted by the Walton Burn whereas Abronhill is not although historically there was a North Whitelees and South Whitelees, the latter being in what is now thought of as Abronhill. Other old maps show Whitelees with various spellings including maps by Charles Ross and William Roy.

The area is probably best known for Whitelees Primary School which is a feeder school for Cumbernauld Academy.

== Toponymy ==
The etymology of the name is uncertain but may mean "a clearing in a wood".
