= Wardpark =

Industrial estate in Cumbernauld, Scotland

Coordinates: 55°58′21″N 3°57′56″W

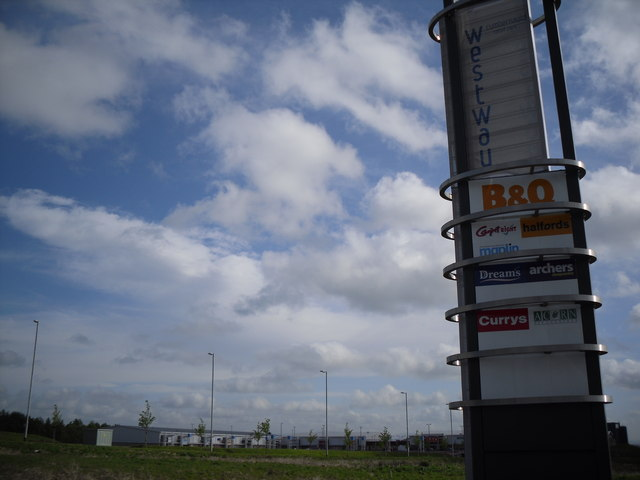
Westway Retail Park, Wardpark near Castlecary

Wardpark is an industrial estate in Cumbernauld, Scotland split by the M80 motorway. The former Burroughs factory, the first factory of Cumbernauld new town, was reoccupied by OKI but was demolished to make way for Westway Retail Park, OKI having been relocated to Westfield.

Warkpark is divided into three areas: Wardpark South, on the Abronhill side of the M80; Wardpark North on the Westerwood side; and Wardpark East which next to it and adjacent to Castlecary village. On the aerial photo the yellow building is part of the Wardpark Studios where the Outlander TV series is made. It is just north of the Westway Retail Park. This film company have plans to expand in 2018.

John G Russell Transport Limited bought one of the largest warehouses, at 5 Wardpark, early in 2018. Other businesses in Wardpark North include Teledyne Technologies, Aspen Solutions Ltd Corporate Insignia Limited, Thermaflow Ltd, Coilcraft Europe Limited, and Masonry Solutions Ltd.

Wardpark South accommodates: Markon Limited, Moulded Foams (Scotland) Ltd., Northwest Plant Limited

Wardpark East accommodates: Coronet Services Limited, Polyglass (GB) Limited,

Cumbernauld Airport is at the northern edge of Wardpark with views down the Strathkelvin valley. The country road to the north has been blocked to motor vehicles and crosses the Antonine Wall and the main Glasgow-Edinburgh railway line before leading to the Forth and Clyde canal.

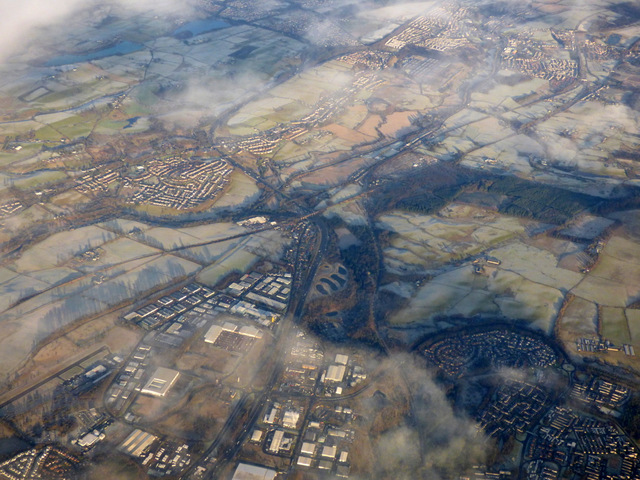
Wardpark from the air. The canal crosses the picture bottom left to top right (west to east). The railway is just below it with the white roof of the CMS buildings at Castlecary between them. The Red Burn (SUDS) ponds can be seen south of the Arches which are just visible. Cumbernauld's Wardpark can be seen being divided by the M80 as it heads north towards Stirling. At the bottom left the edge of Westerwood can be seen below Cumbernauld Airport. At the bottom, the small white T-shaped building is the Old Inns petrol station which separates Castlecary Road from the M80. The curve of Forest Road round Whitelees in Cumbernauld and Whitelees Roundabout which divides it from Abronhill are at the bottom right. North of Castlecary, Banknock can be seen on the left extending towards Longcroft and Dennyloanhead with Denny and Bonnybridge at the top right.

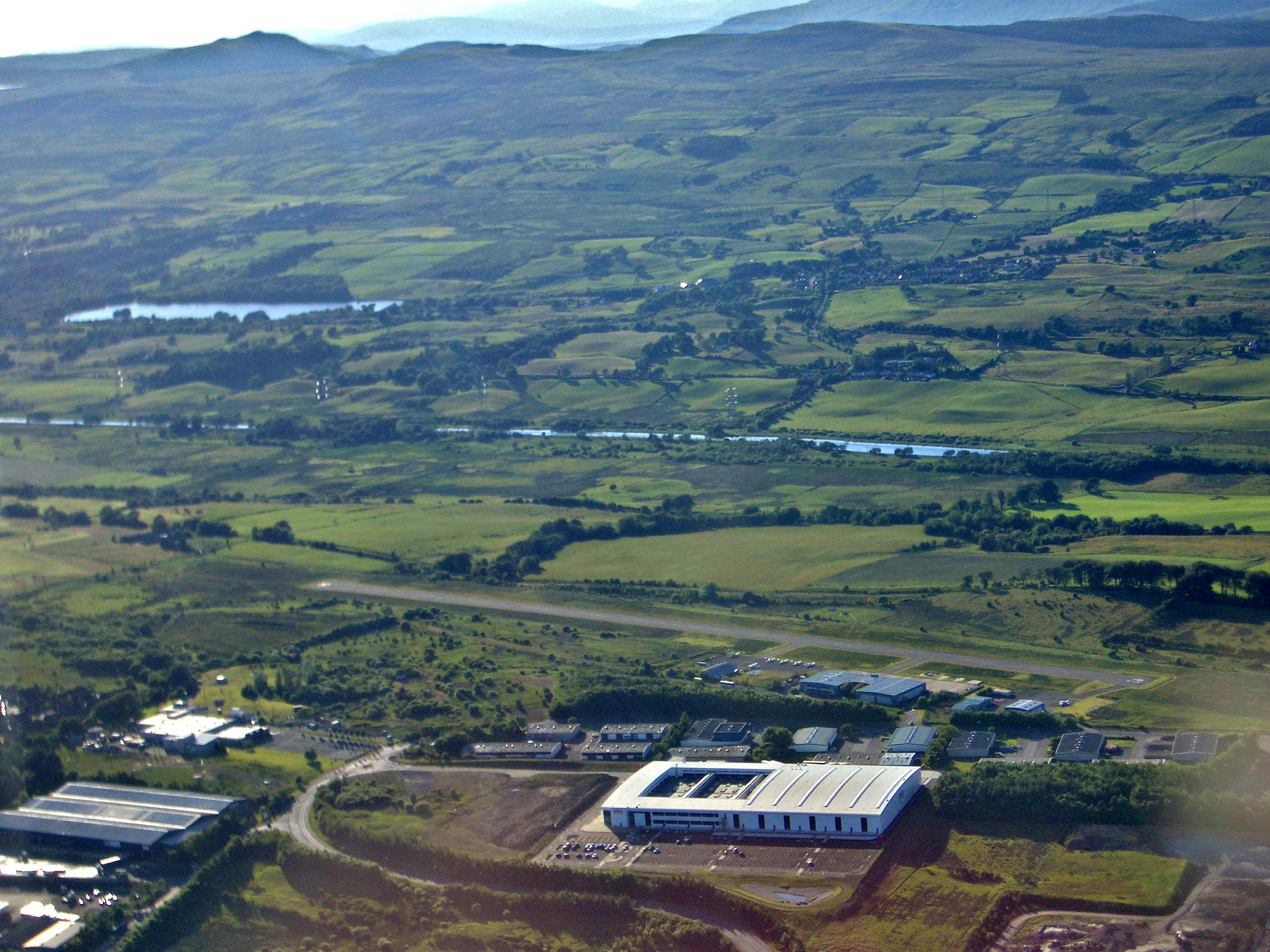
Bottom right to top left: Wardpark, Cumbernauld Airport, Arniebog Farm, Military Way (Antonine Wall), Westerwood Golf Course, the Forth and Clyde canal, Banton Loch (Townhead Reservoir), the Campsie Fells.

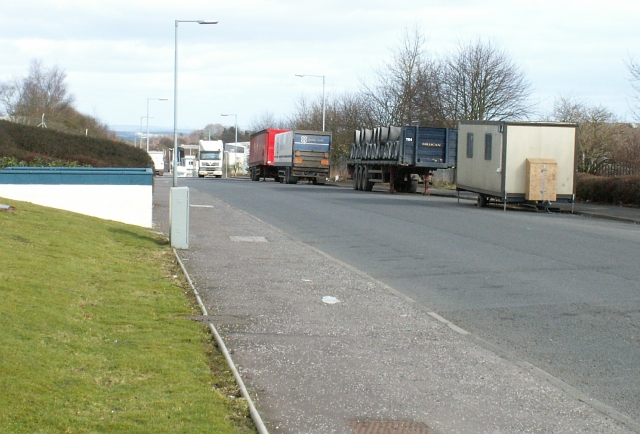
Wardpark industrial estate, Cumbernauld
