= Red Burn =

Stream in Cumbernauld, Falkirk, Scotland

Coordinates: 55.98330°N 3.94802°W

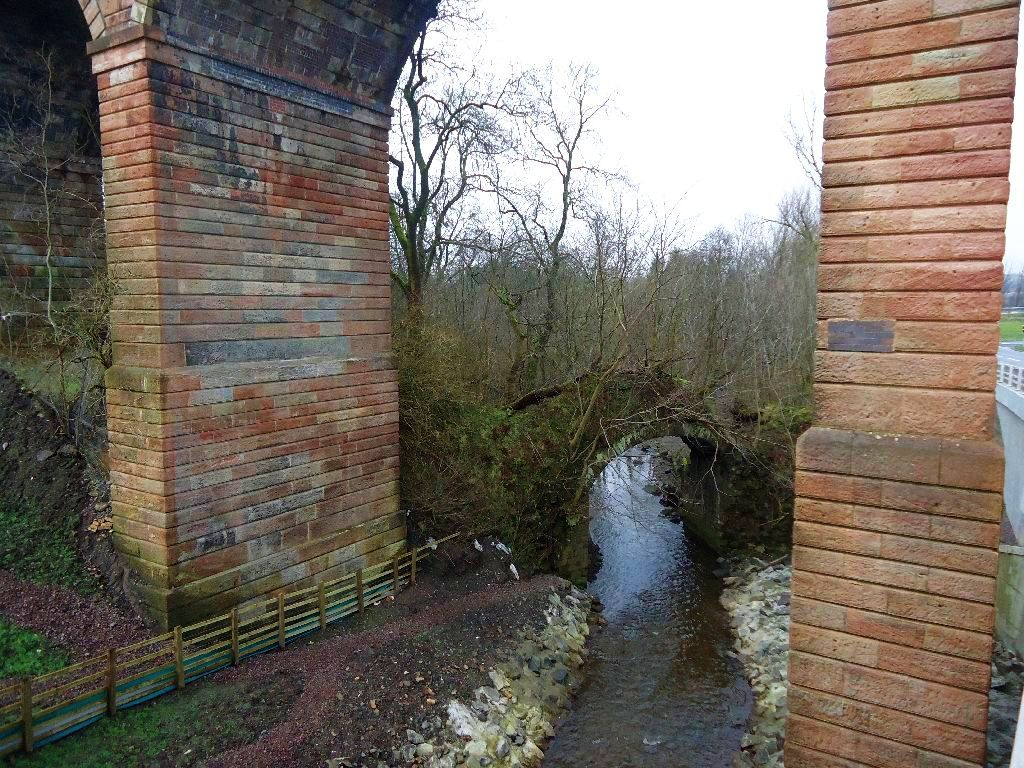
The Red Burn going through an arch of the Castlecary Viaduct

The Red Burn is one of two main streams which flow out of Cumbernauld. The Scottish New Town’s name derives from the Gaelic for "the meeting of the waters" and there is broad agreement that one of these waters is the Red Burn.

== Source and course of the river ==
The Red Burn's headwater begins as a rivulet on the west side of Fannyside Lochs known as the Glencryan Burn.

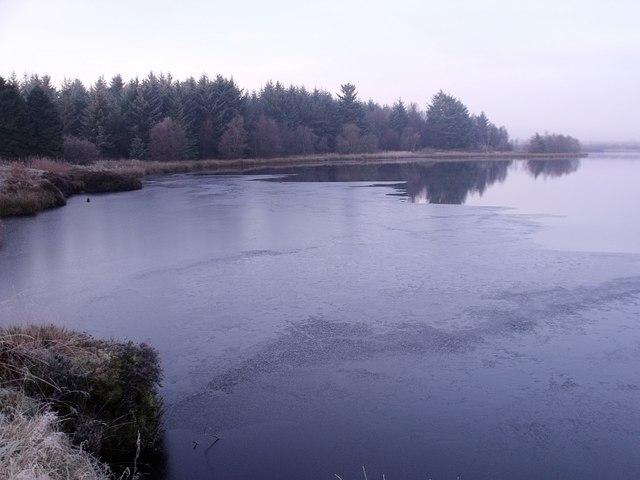
West Fannyside Loch

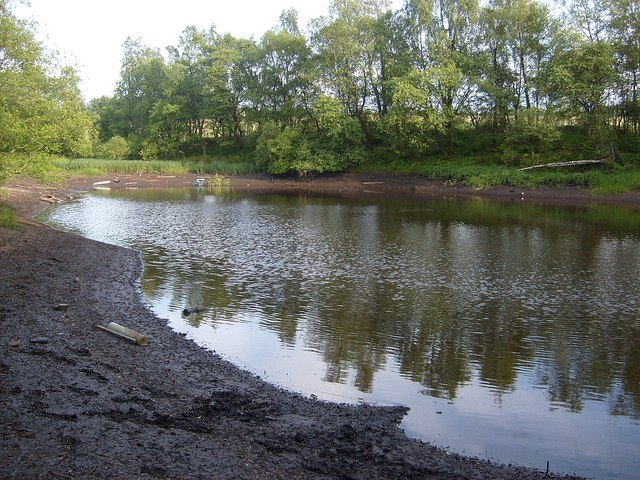
Glencryan Reservoir

It flows west through Palacerigg County Park and becomes a significant geographic feature where it fills the Glencryan Reservoir south of Forest Road in Cumbernauld. The name of the stream from its source until it enters the Vault Glen is the Glencryan Burn. It enters Cumbernauld behind Cumbernauld Academy (formerly Cumbernauld High). The river then runs under Forest Road and its name changes to The Red Burn on the other side. The river takes a sudden turn to the east and is joined by a few nameless rivulets which come down from both the steep sided banks, the left bank being Kildrum and the right hand being Abronhill. The Scottish Wildlife Trust owns the land around the river at this point with the exception of a sewage pipeline which runs through the Vault Glen. The Vault Glen has very steep sides with the stream some 25-30m below the brow of the hill and any rubbish dropped is difficult to remove although there have been some attempts to clean it up. The Red Burn crosses the railway under a large viaduct before its confluence with the Bog Stank just down river from the bridge over the path from the Park above.

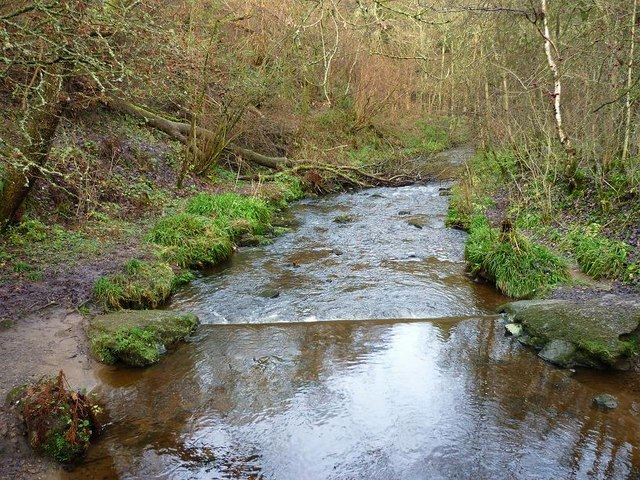
View from the Bridge over the Red Burn in the Vault Glen. A few metres downstream it meets the Bog Stank

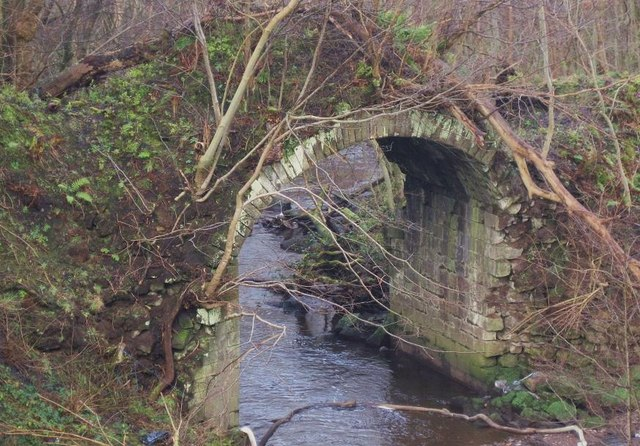
18th Century Bridge at Castlecary

After the confluence the Red Burn passes the dovecote and Broom Road, Abronhill before flowing back under the Forest Road Bridge heading towards Dunns Wood. From there the river passes through a sewage works. Work costing £3.8 million was completed on upgrading the water treatment system in 2013. Its purpose is to clean water from the Wardpark Estate before it joins the river. Scottish Water made a system of ponds which are designed to have the same effect as larger natural system. They contain the water then filter them and release the purified water slowly.

The system called Sustainable Urban Drainage System (SUDS), prevents flooding by absorbing water from short-term storm flashes and releases it over a longer period of time. Theoretically pollutants are extracted and cleaner water is subsequently released back into the river. Because of the catchment area's size six ponds were required. Beside the ponds, the £10.5million project constructed a £10.5 million pound extra treatment process. This provides a higher standard of waste water treatment, and should allow for expansion due to population growth. In 2018 Scottish Water was fined £17k for a discharge of raw sewage into the Red Burn in 2014.

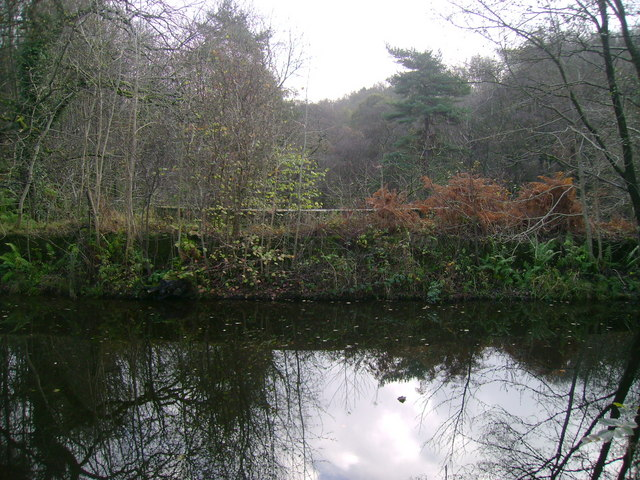
Forth and Clyde canal passing over the Red Burn on aqueduct

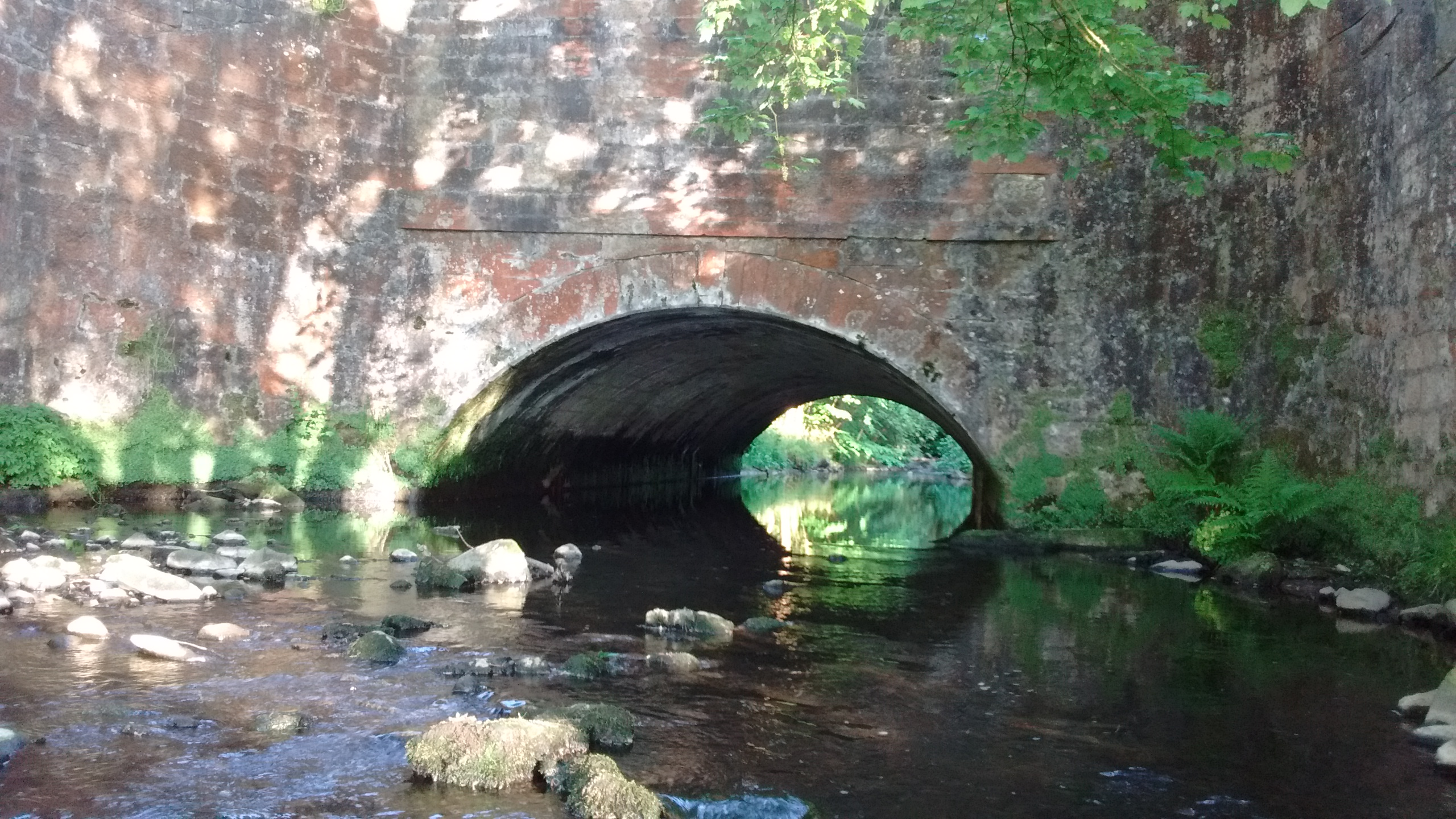
Red Burn passing under Forth and Clyde Canal

The only significant subsequent tributary of the Red Burn is the Walton Burn which flows round the east side of Abronhill. The river forms the border between Falkirk and North Lanarkshire councils at this point. The Red Burn then flows under the M80, the B816 and the 18th century Castlecary Viaduct carrying the railway track. This is close to the historic Castle Cary Castle.

After the Red Burn has crossed the road and the railway it is then crossed by the Forth and Clyde Canal on an aqueduct close to Bonny Water.

The Red Burn's confluence with the smaller Bonny Water occurs just north of the canal and the river is now called the Bonny Water until it reaches the River Carron downstream. The Carron itself enters the Firth of Forth at Grangemouth.

== Competing Theories for Cumbernauld's Name ==
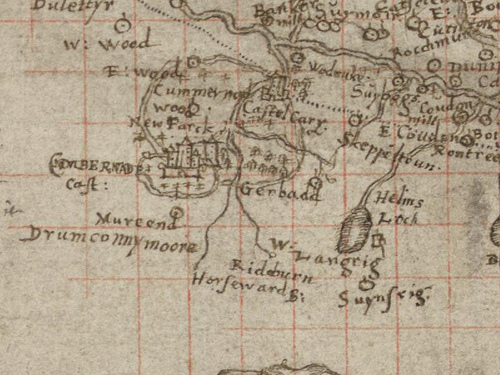
Pont's Map of the area around Cummernad Wood New Parck

Blaeu's map from 1654 based on Pont's original c.1596 "The East Central Lowlands (Stirling, Falkirk & Kilsyth) - Pont 32" map depicting Cumbernad Caſt., Dulettyr, W. Wood, Caſtel Cary, Ridburn and the mysterious Horſeward B.

Cumbernauld is the largest town in North Lanarkshire. Some people think the name Cumbernauld's Gaelic name Comar nan Allt meaning "the confluence of the waters" refers to the meeting of the Red Burn with the Bog Stank stream. This occurs in the Vault Glen down the hill but very close to the site of the Comyn’s Castle. In support of this argument the oldest maps of Cumbernauld still in existence show the “Rid Burn” joining three other streams. On the map they all seem to come together at one point although this bears little relation to the current watercourses. Probably the earliest map which shows the river is the 1596 Pont's Map but is much easier to pick out on Blaeu's coloured map which was derived from it. Another stream named as the Horseward Burn is mentioned and is shown to join with the Red Burn. What this refers to is not at all clear. It's entirely possible it refers to a stream whose source would have been the high moor near to where the southern edge of the Town Centre is sited. This then flowed east and then south thru Carbrain gully then east again before joining the Red Burn. This stream consequently would have been culverted over and drained via the new towns drainage systems during the towns construction and therefore no longer exists. These older maps are reminiscent of the modern Friends of the Glen map which is also a stylised representation of the Park. Pont's map does mention the Luggie but doesn't seem to associate this with Cumbernauld or its castle. In fact the Luggie is a considerable distance from Cumbernauld Village. The name Condorrat, formerly a separate village but now part of the town, has a Gaelic origin too: "Comh Dobhair Alt" - The joint river place. This name may be close in meaning to Cumbernauld's.

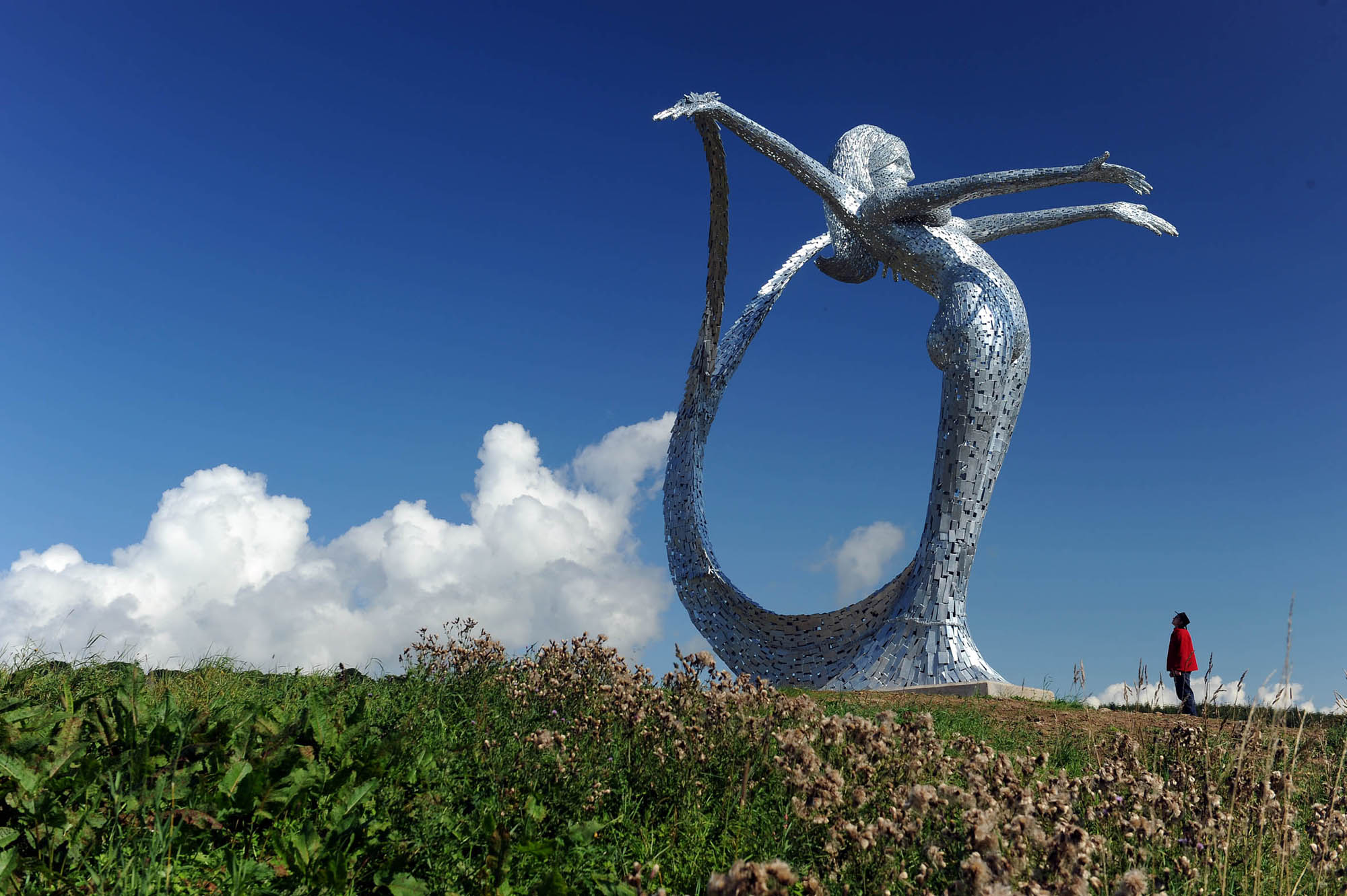
Andy Scott Arria Cumbernauld with a poem "Watershed" inscribed on its base.

The other competing theory is that the etymology of the name is to do with Cumbernauld being a Scottish watershed. In that case the waters referred to are the Red Burn and the Luggie Water even though they do not in fact meet. In other words from its high point in the Central Belt, The Luggie Water and the Red Burn flow either west to the River Clyde or east to the Firth of Forth so Cumbernauld is a watershed. Jim Carruth, poet laureate of Glasgow, has a poem called Watershed which is inscribed on the base of Andy Scott's Arria, The Angel of the 'Naud, statue which overlooks the A80 in Cumbernauld. This presupposes the etymology of the name is about Cumbernauld being a watershed. Hugo Millar, the respected local historian and author of two books about the town, espoused this view.

Peter Drummond gives an analysis of both viewpoints from historical and geographical perspectives. What can be said with confidence is that Cumbernauld is named after the Red Burn.

== Influence on Local Placenames ==
Three streets in Cumbernauld are named after the Red Burn and also use the older form of the name where Redburn is just one word. These are in the Abronhill part of the town. Similarly Redburn School takes its name from the stream.

== Roman History ==
The Antonine Wall named after the Roman Emperor Antoninus Pius, crosses the Red Burn at Castlecary and Roman remains have been found on both sides of the river. The wall, built by Urbicus's men is named on the Unesco World Heritage list as a Frontier for the Roman Empire. However the land has been considerably worked for the Forth and Clyde Canal, the Glasgow to Edinburgh railway and the A80 now M80 road system. Older maps show how the fort of Castle Cary was to the east of the river, as was the later Castle Cary Castle. There is also the site of a Roman camp to the west of the river near the modern Castlecary Hotel.

There is a gruesome story about how the Red Burn (sometimes called the Rid Burn or Redburn) was named. It involves the killing of Agricola's Roman soldiers whose bodies were dumped in the river at Castlecary making it run red.

== Other Cumbernauldian Watercourses ==
Contrary to Jon Ronson's insulting comments endorsed by Craig Ferguson on C.B.S.'s Late, Late Show, Cumbernauld does have at least two rivers: the Red Burn and the Luggie Water. There is also the Moss Water which was dammed to form Broadwood Loch.
