= Castlecary =

Village in North Lanarkshire, Scotland

Coordinates: 55.979°N 3.949°W

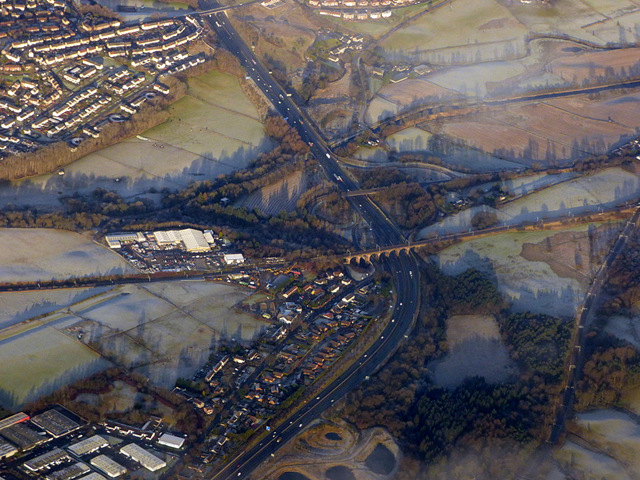
- Castlecary from the air

- Location within Scotland Castlecary (Scotland)
- OS grid reference: NS783779
- Civil parish: Cumbernauld
- Lieutenancy area: Dunbartonshire
- Country: Scotland
- Sovereign state: United Kingdom
- Post town: GLASGOW
- Postcode district: G68
- Dialling code: 01324
- Police: Scotland
- Fire: Scottish
- Ambulance: Scottish
- UK Parliament: Cumbernauld, Kilsyth and Kirkintilloch East
- Scottish Parliament: Cumbernauld and Kilsyth

Castlecary (/ˌkɑːsəlˈkɛəri/) is a small historic village in North Lanarkshire, Scotland, directly adjacent to the border with Falkirk. It has long been associated with infrastructure, being adjacent to a bridged river, a Roman fort and roads, a nationwide canal, a Victorian railway viaduct, and a modern motorway. Castlecary is close to the town of Cumbernauld; like Dullatur and Luggiebank, it was not originally part of the new town, but since incorporation into the North Lanarkshire Council area in 1995 it has been considered part of the town. Around 1725, the barony of Castlecary, with a population of just seventeen families, was disjoined from the parish of Falkirk, and annexed to Cumbernauld quoad sacra. Castlecary is also near Allandale which, though in the Falkirk council area, was built for Castlecary fireclay workers.

== Roman Heritage ==
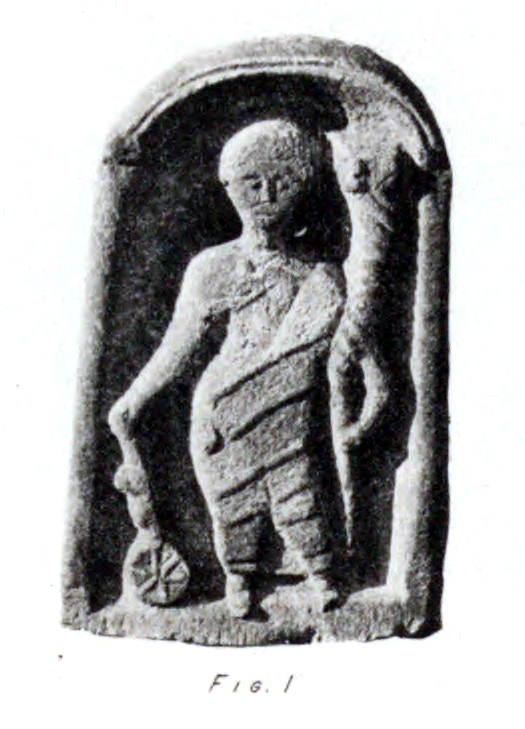
Statuette of the Roman god Fortuna, with gubernaculum (ship's rudder), Rota Fortunae (wheel of fortune) and cornucopia (horn of plenty) found near the altar at Castlecary in 1771.

Castlecary, like many other settlements in the area, is steeped in the Roman history of Scotland. The route of the Antonine Wall passes through the village. Around 80 AD, a Roman camp was built at Castlecary. It may have been during governor Agricola's fourth campaign season. Most Roman forts along the wall held garrisons of around 500 men. Larger forts like Castlecary and Birrens had a nominal cohort of 1000 men but probably sheltered women and children as well although the troops were not allowed to marry. There is likely too to have been large communities of civilians around the site. In 1769, workmen seeking materials for the Forth and Clyde Canal, found 8 apartments along with the remains of an L-shaped, hypocausted, bathhouse in the south-east section of the fort. Inside the walls other objects such as human bones, pottery shards and boars' tusks were discovered. Historically, the site was not handled with much respect to archaeology as even gunpowder was used at the fort to improve land for agriculture. It was, however, excavated sympathetically in 1902.

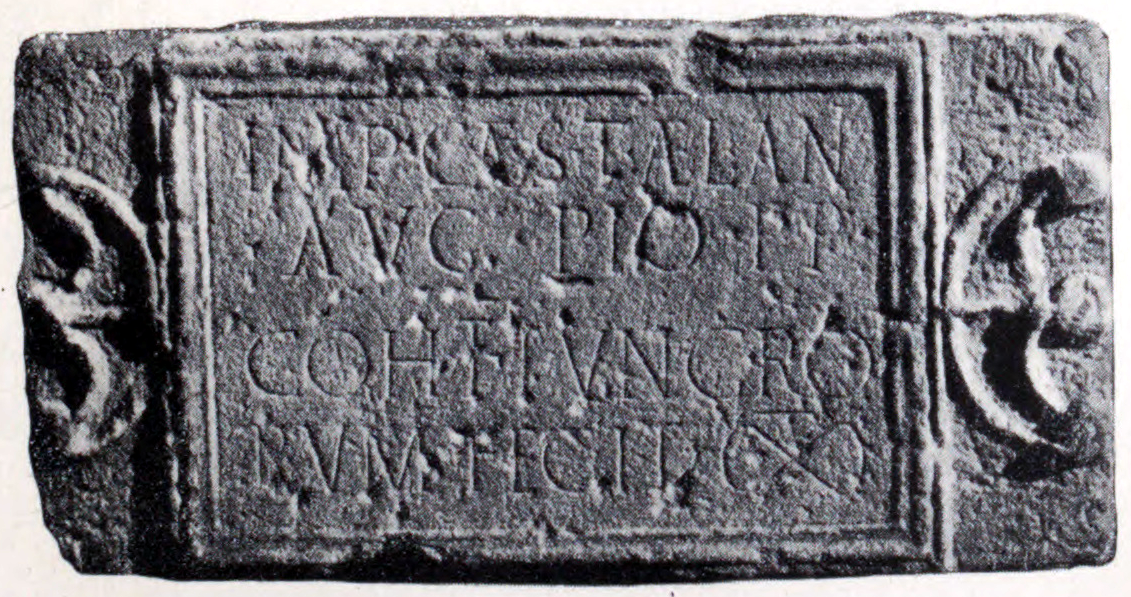
RIB 2155. Auxiliary tablet of the First Cohort of Tungrians. George MacDonald calls it no. 30 in the 2nd edition of his book The Roman Wall in Scotland.

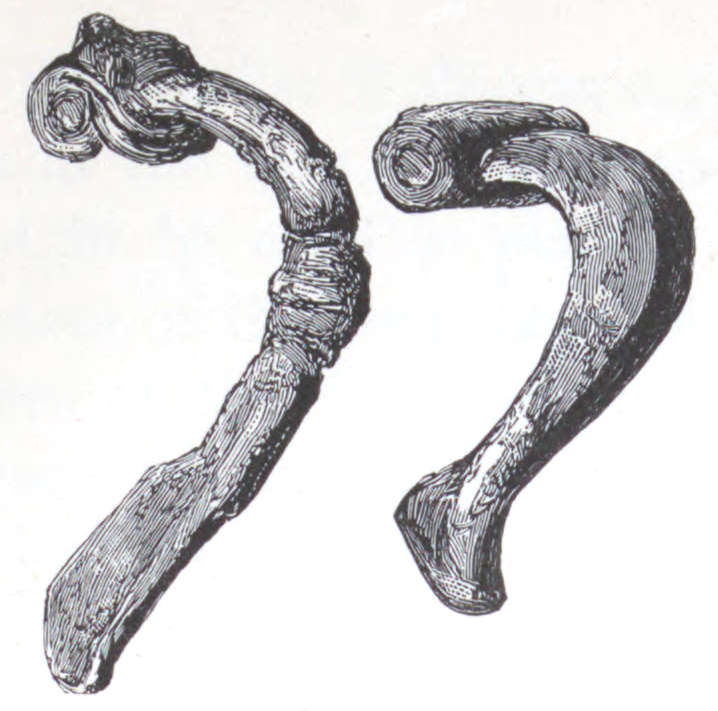
fibulae from Castlecary

Artefacts, found at Castlecary, such as the altar to the Roman god Fortuna can now be viewed at the Hunterian Museum in Glasgow. Eleven inscribed stoneworks have been recovered from the Castlecary fort. Nine of these were altars; six bear the names of Roman military units. A sandstone statuette of Fortuna, the Roman god of luck, fate, fortune (and even, in Fortuna Redux, safe-return) was found at Castlecary in 1771. Fortuna is depicted on around 1000 different Roman coins and looking at them leaves little doubt that it's Fortuna and not Mercury that is depicted. A Roman altar to Mercury by the Sixth Legion was found at Castlecary. George MacDonald calls it no. 36 in the 2nd edition of his book The Roman Wall in Scotland. It's a small altar; Macdonald says it's only about 20 by 10 inches. He regarded it as notable for showing that Italians and Britons were comrades in the Roman army. An altar to an unknown goddess was found while digging the canal. It is hard to read anything more than four letters.

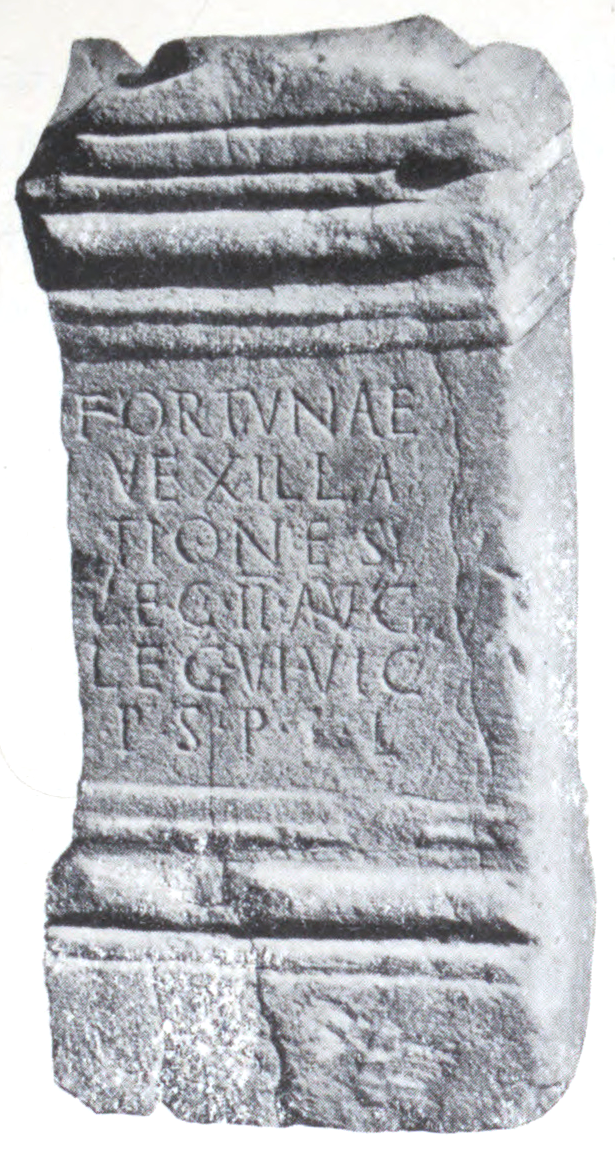
RIB 2146. Altar dedicated to Fortuna by the Second and Sixth Legions found by workmen on the Forth and Clyde Canal at Castlecary in 1769.

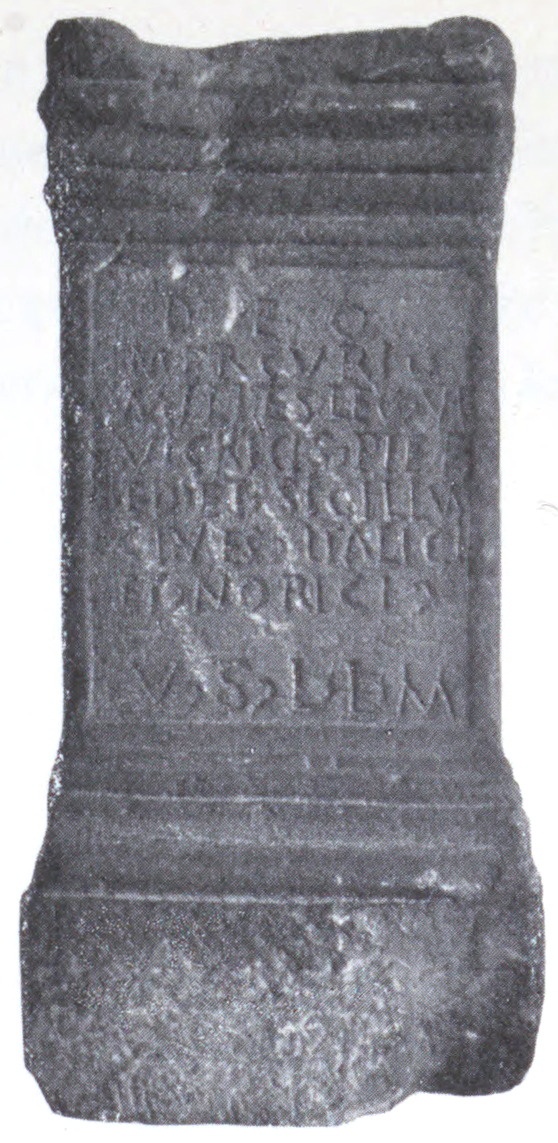
RIB 2148. Altar dedicated to Mercury by the Sixth Legion. Found between the fort and the Red Burn.

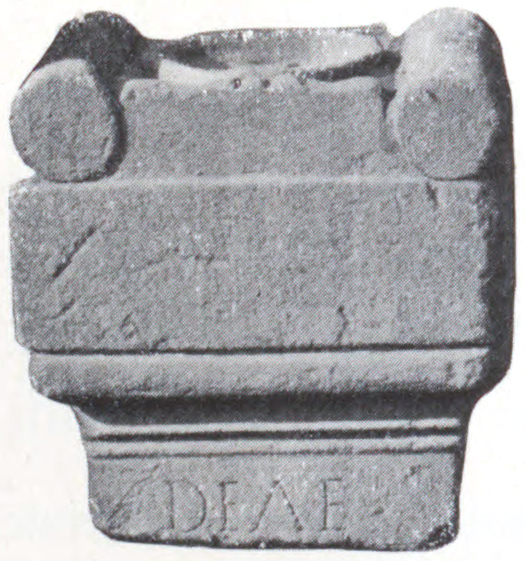
RIB 2150. Altar dedicated to a goddess.

A few coins and the remains of a Roman tuba were also recovered and well as a pair of small shoes suggesting there were children onsite. The National Scottish Museums also list a cornu mouthpiece, a glass cup fragment, an iron claw hammer, a wooden spatula and two sculpted stones. One stone identifies the 'sixth cohort, the century of Antonius Aratus'. In the 21st century a treasure trove of a lion's head was discovered at Castlecary. The site in relation to the Red Burn, the Forth and Clyde Canal, the road, and the former railway station can be seen on older maps. The canal crosses the Red Burn on an aqueduct, close to the Bonny Water just outside Castlecary. Just west of Castlecary, at Garnhall, two Roman temporary camps were discovered. A round enclosure and a possible watchtower were also found although these are not visible today. At Tollpark, remains one of the longest continuous stretches of the Wall. It is found between the forts at Castlecary and Westerwood. A kissing gate behind the hotel provides access to this section of the wall.

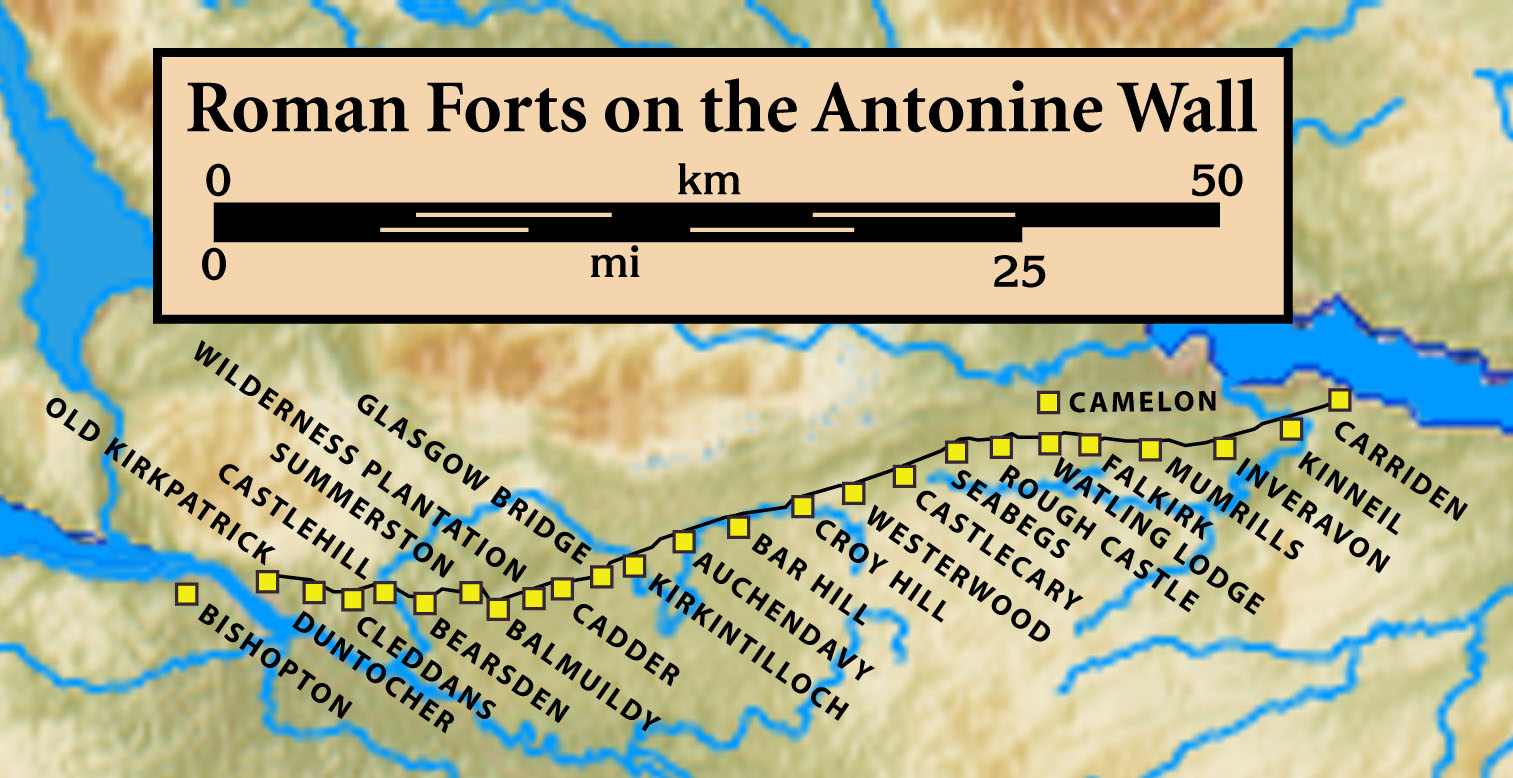
Forts and Fortlets associated with the Antonine Wall from west to east: Bishopton, Old Kilpatrick, Duntocher, Cleddans, Castlehill, Bearsden, Summerston, Balmuildy, Wilderness Plantation, Cadder, Glasgow Bridge, Kirkintilloch, Auchendavy, Bar Hill, Croy Hill, Westerwood, Castlecary, Seabegs, Rough Castle, Camelon, Watling Lodge, Falkirk, Mumrills, Inveravon, Kinneil, Carriden

Some antiquarians posited that Castlecary was Ptolemy's Coria Damniorum although such assertions lack evidence. The Damnonii or Damnii themselves are only mentioned by Ptolemy.

== Fireclay Brickworks ==
There were two fireclay brickworks in Castlecary: Castlecary Fireclay Company Limited, known as Weir's Castlecary, established during the late 19th century by Alexander Weir, which closed in 1968; and Stein's Castlecary Works established by John G Stein which continued until the 1980s. The two companies were over the road from each other. Stein's brickworks in Allandale opened in 1899 and provided local employment for many years. The site is now derelict and awaiting redevelopment. Allandale village was built for the Castlecary brickworkers and John Stein's business grew to be the 2nd largest fireclay brick manufacturer in the world. Some early footage of the 1932 Castlecary gala day survives shot by the Stein family. Other 19th century employers include a quarry and a sawmill.

== Railway Station and Memorial Garden ==
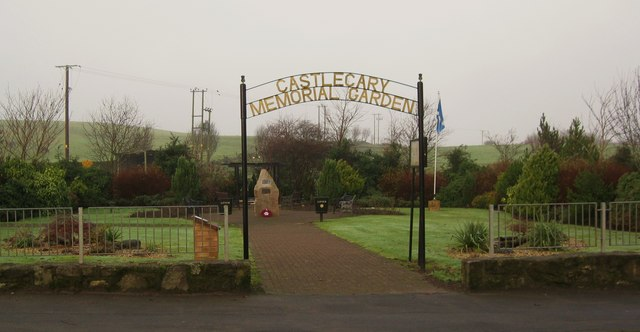
Castlecary Memorial Garden - built to commemorate two local children who died when, in 1958, a mineshaft suddenly opened up in their swing park.

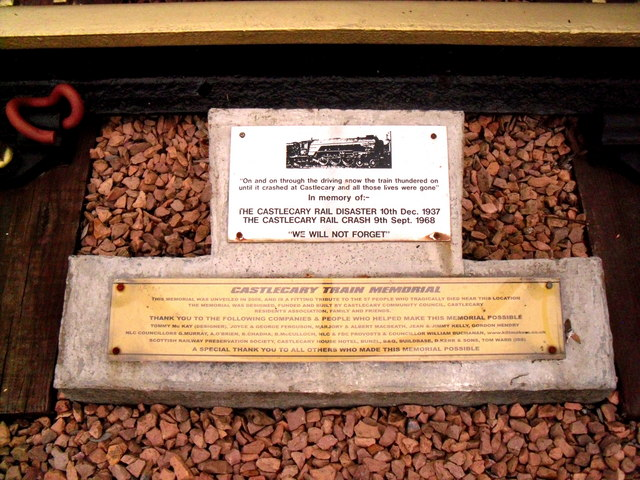
Plaques, Castlecary Train Memorial, Castlecary Memorial Garden

One suggested use of the former brickworks has been the construction of a new "park and ride" railway station, which was to be called Allandale. It had been previously suggested that the station be called Castlecary, but representations were made to the scheme's sponsors not to call it this given the existence of a Castle Cary station in Somerset and the potential for confusion between the two.

Previously a Castlecary railway station existed but it closed in 1967. It was the site of a major accident, the Castlecary Rail Disaster on 10 December 1937, when two trains collided with one another. The accident cost the lives of 35 people, with a further 179 injured. A memorial was installed in the memorial garden in the village on 30 August 2008. The Castlecary Rail Crash of 9 September 1968 is also commemorated there.

== Today's village ==
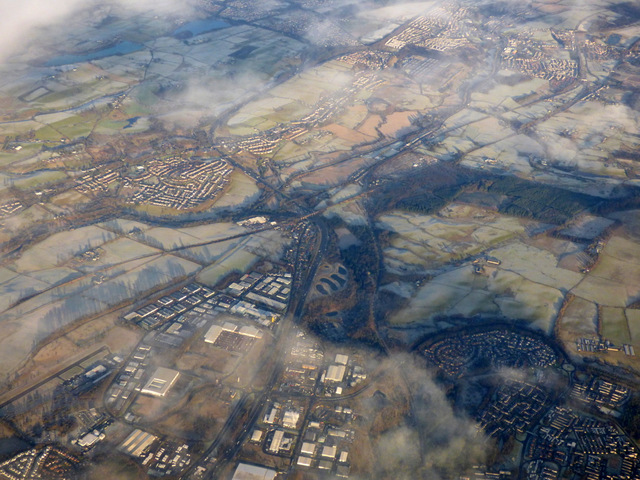
Castlecary from the air. The canal crosses the picture bottom left to top right (west to east). The railway is just below it with the white roof of the CMS buildings at Castlecary between them. The Red Burn (SUDS) ponds can be seen south of the Arches which are just visible. Cumbernauld's Wardpark can be seen being divided by the M80 as it heads north towards Stirling. At the bottom left the edge of Westerwood can be seen below Cumbernauld Airport. At the bottom, the small white T-shaped building is the Old Inns petrol station which separates Castlecary Road from the M80. The curve of Forest Road round Whitelees in Cumbernauld and Whitelees Roundabout which divides it from Abronhill are at the bottom right. North of Castlecary, Banknock can be seen on the left extending towards Longcroft and Dennyloanhead with Denny and Bonnybridge at the top right.

There is little beyond housing in the village today. The Castlecary House Hotel is a well-known business in the village and was up for sale in 2016. The hotel is in a central location, sited to the west of the M80 motorway and south of the canal. The fort and the castle are east of the M80 which bisects the village from much of its history. A major employer in the area is CMS Windows which is based in Castlecary and employs over 250 people nationally.

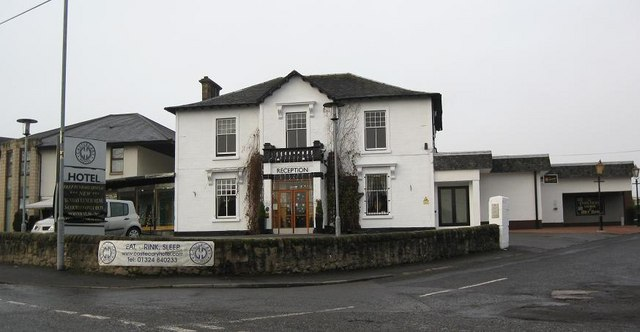
The Castlecary House Hotel

Castlecary commonly lends its name to a viaduct which crosses the M80, although its official name is the "Castlecary, Red Burn, Railway Viaduct" or Red Burn Viaduct. The landmark, known by many as the "Castlecary Arches", was built for the Edinburgh and Glasgow Railway, which opened in 1842. Before the A80 opened, the road went under a single arch.

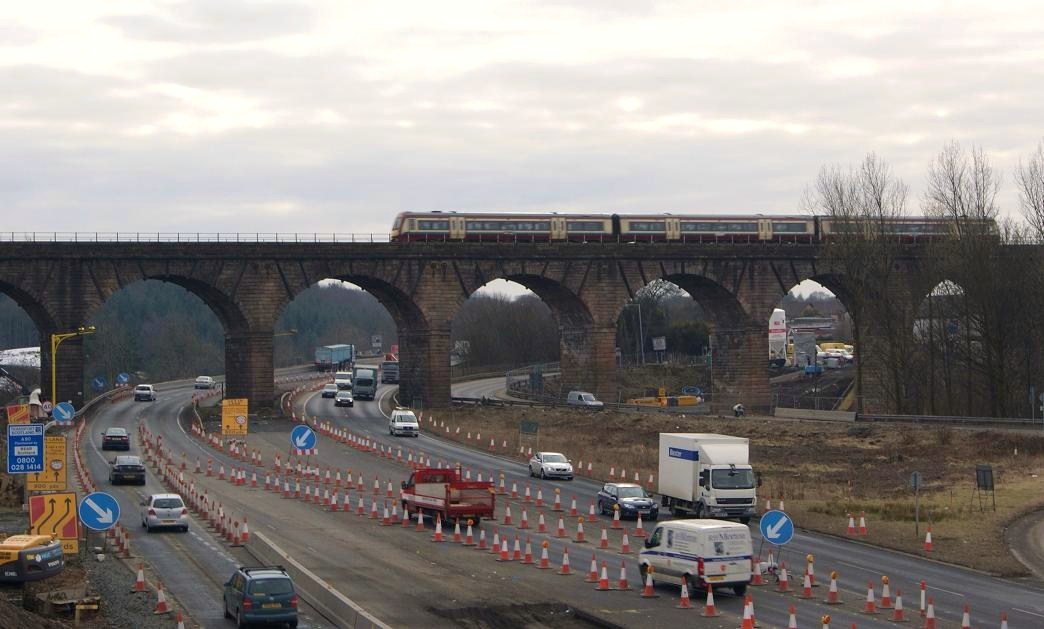
Castlecary Arches

Along with the adjacent Forth and Clyde Canal and the Bonny Water, the viaduct acts as a physical representation of Castlecary's status as an isogloss, as it is around here that there is a distinct change from the West Central Scots accent spoken around Cumbernauld (many of the town's residents having strong links to Glasgow) to the East Central Scots spoken in nearby Bonnybridge and Denny. Around 15 miles (24 km) to the south-east, Harthill is another location alongside a motorway perceived to denote a shift between dialects as well as local authorities.

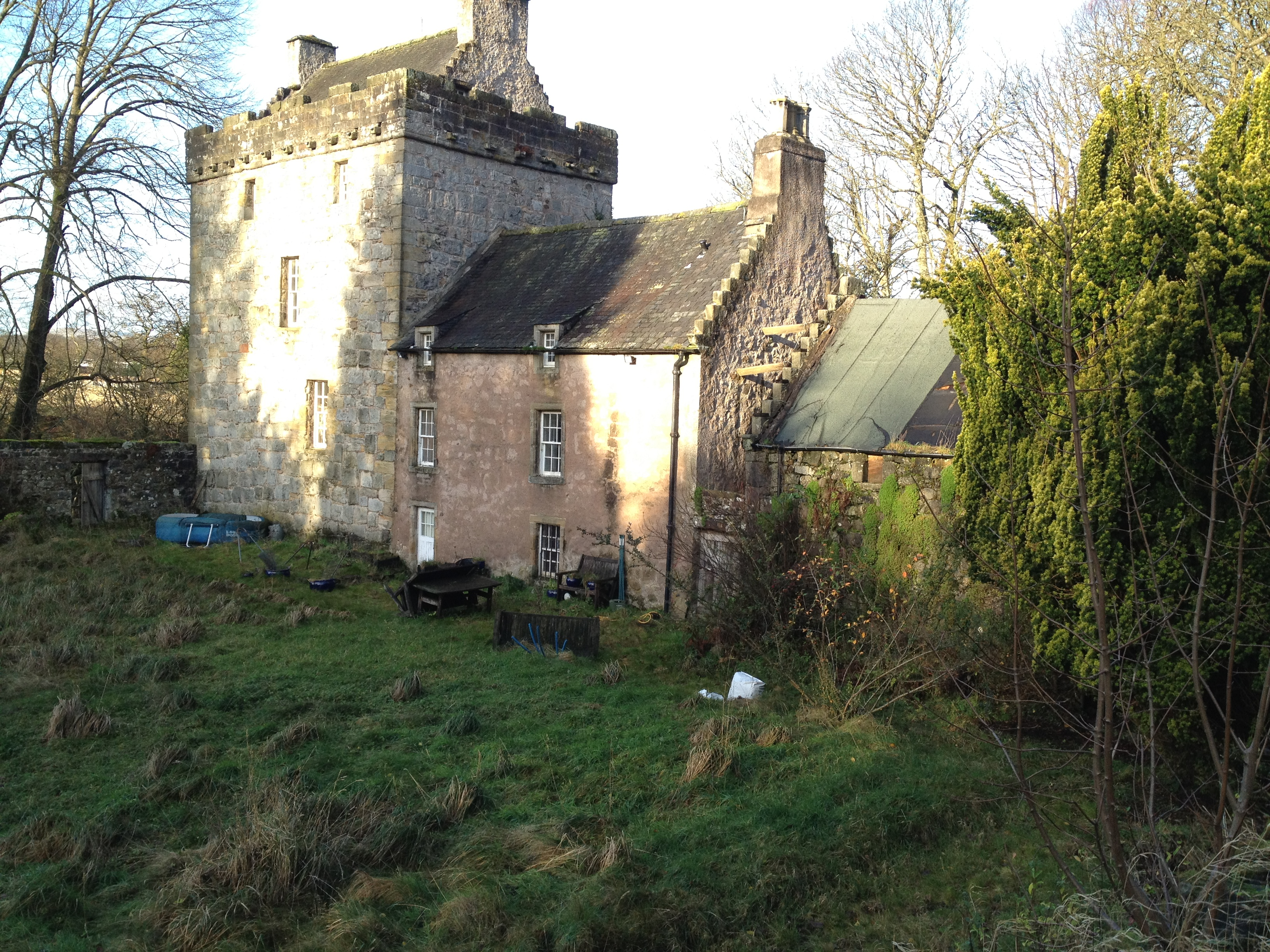
Castlecary Castle

Castlecary Primary School shut sometime between 1973 and 1976. Extracts from a 2nd world war log book from the school survive and are available. A new play park for children opened in June 2018.

Castle Cary Castle, on the opposite side of the M80, is where Lizzie Baillie, in her love, is supposed to have jumped from a window.
