= Abronhill High School =

Coordinates: 55°57′33″N 3°57′11″W

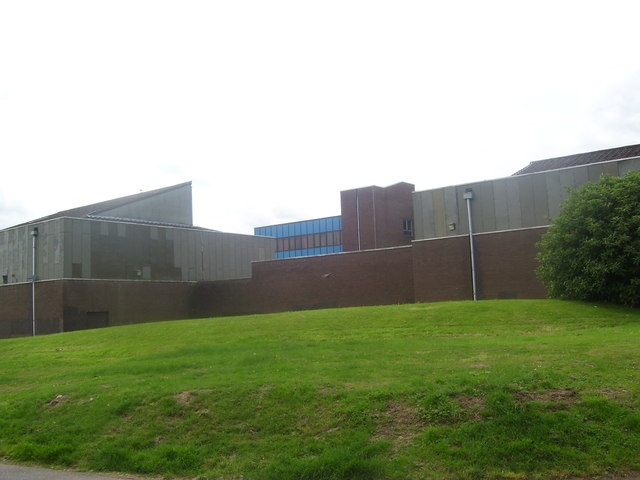
- Abronhill High School
- Abronhill, Cumbernauld; Scotland

Information
- Type: Non-Denominational
- Established: 1978
- Closed: 2014
- Local authority: North Lanarkshire Council
- Enrollment: 430

Abronhill High School was a non-denominational, comprehensive, secondary school in Abronhill, a suburb of the Scottish new town of Cumbernauld. The school roll was 473 pupils in January 2009. The school was the setting of the 1981 Scottish film Gregory's Girl. Abronhill High School was located near Abronhill Shopping Centre. It closed in June 2014.

The school was used by director Bill Forsyth for the external and internal location scenes of his 1981 coming-of-age romantic comedy film Gregory's Girl.

== History ==
The school was opened on 22 November 1978 by a local councillor, Martin Green. Abronhill High School was the third non-denominational high school to open in the Cumbernauld area. It was built for a capacity of around 1000 students although in years before its closure the school roll was only around 500. In 2007 pupils at the school piloted a mountain biking scheme that was developed with Forestry Commission Scotland. On 1 September 2008, pupils at Abronhill High were the first in Scotland to receive the HPV vaccine at their school.

== Closure ==
In September 2012 North Lanarkshire Council (NLC) informed parents that it wished to close Abronhill High from August 2013 and transfer pupils to Cumbernauld High. NLC's learning and leisure services committee approved the merger of these schools, saying that they anticipated this would address a falling school roll and be part of £1.3 million of savings. It was subsequently delayed until 2014 following a consultation. The plan was criticised for damaging pupils' education. This did not stop NLC from going forward with the closure, and on 27 June 2014, the school was closed. Demolition commenced on 18 November 2014.

== Redevelopment ==
After demolition the site remained vacant for almost a decade. The initial council plan to sell the land to a housing developer stalled due to local and political opposition. In June 2020, NLC announced the area would not be sold for housing instead it proposed a new strategy where the former Abronhill school "will be assessed as a potential site for a future town and community hub, incorporating primary school provision and improved community facilities".
