= Kildrum =

Area of Cumbernauld, Scotland

Coordinates: 55°57′11″N 3°58′17″W

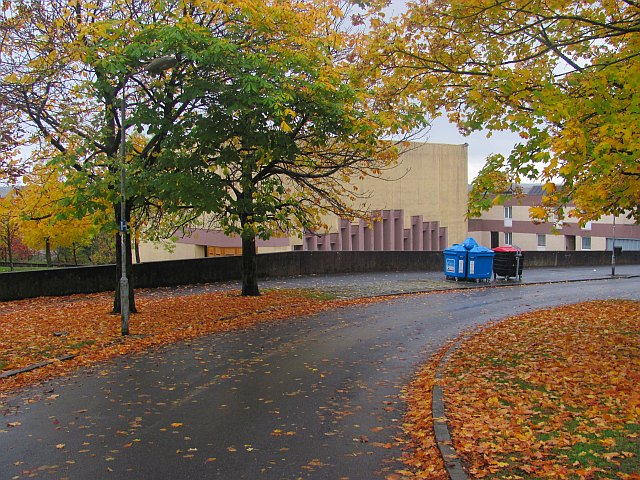
Autumn colours outside Sacred Heart Church, Kildrum

Kildrum was the first area to be constructed in Cumbernauld new town, North Lanarkshire, Scotland. It provided housing for the workers at the Burroughs factory at Old Inns, the first factory in Cumbernauld New Town.

The main road is in the shape of an arc with residential streets leading from it. Inside the arc are ex-corporation houses and there is better quality, mostly private, housing on the outside. The street names of Kildrum are taken from places associated with Robert Burns.

Facilities include Cumbernauld Academy, Kildrum primary school, Kildrum family learning centre, Redburn ASN School, health centre/dentist, YMCA, three shops, chemist, two churches/chapels, Salvation Army and the new Cumbernauld theatre ( Red Lantern Theatre)

Kildrum's history did not begin with the new town since as far back as 1 October 1310 Robert the Bruce wrote to Edward II of England from Kildrum trying, unsuccessfully, to establish peace between Scotland and England. There was also a farm about which some records exist. The Town Centre and Carbrain lie to the west of Kildrum. To the north is Seafar, to the east Cumbernauld Park and to the south Cumbernauld Glen.

== Streets and their facilities ==
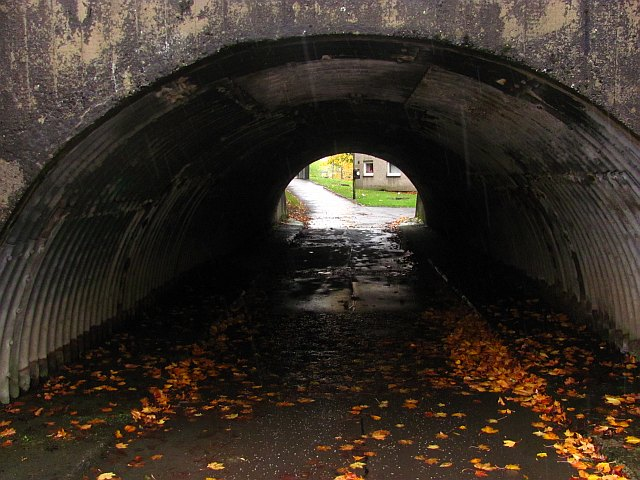
Underpass with a view into Kildrum

Kildrum Road - main road
Tarbolton Road
Kyle Road - Sacred Heart Church
Campsie View
Afton Road - shop and YMCA
Braehead Road - shop -
Park Way
Castle Way
Meadow View
Ainslie Road
Forest View
Glen View
Burn View
Maclehose Road
Glencairn Road
Moss Knowe
Lamerton Road
Clouden Road - Salvation Army
Lochlea Road - Kildrum Health Centre and Dentist
Mossgiel Road
Ellisland Road - Kildrum Primary School
Doon Side
Corbiston Way - shop
Kenmore Road - Red lantern theatre and Kildrum Parish Church nearby
Alloway court

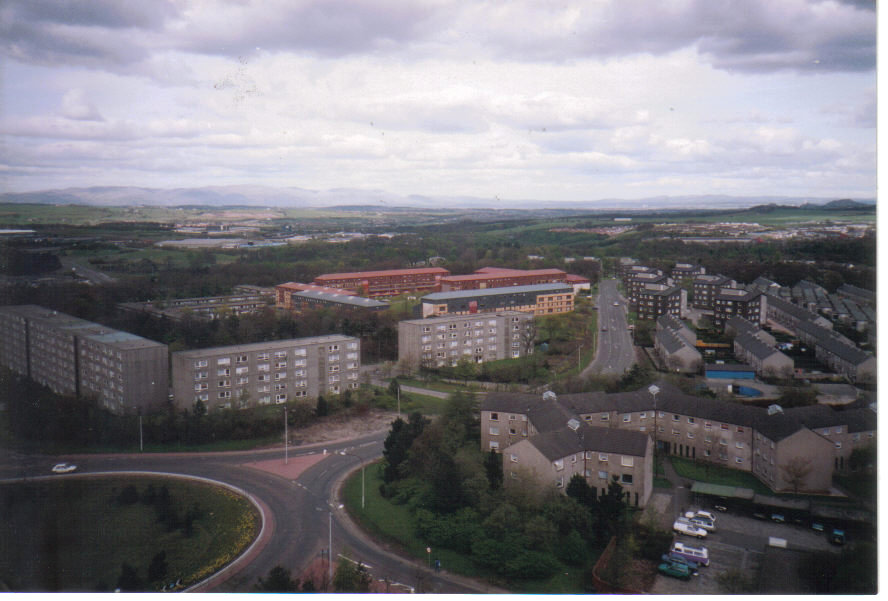
View from the top of Stuart House in 1992, looking north-east over Kildrum
