= Carbrain =

Neighbourhood in North Lanarkshire, Scotland

Coordinates: 55°56′45″N 3°58′55″W

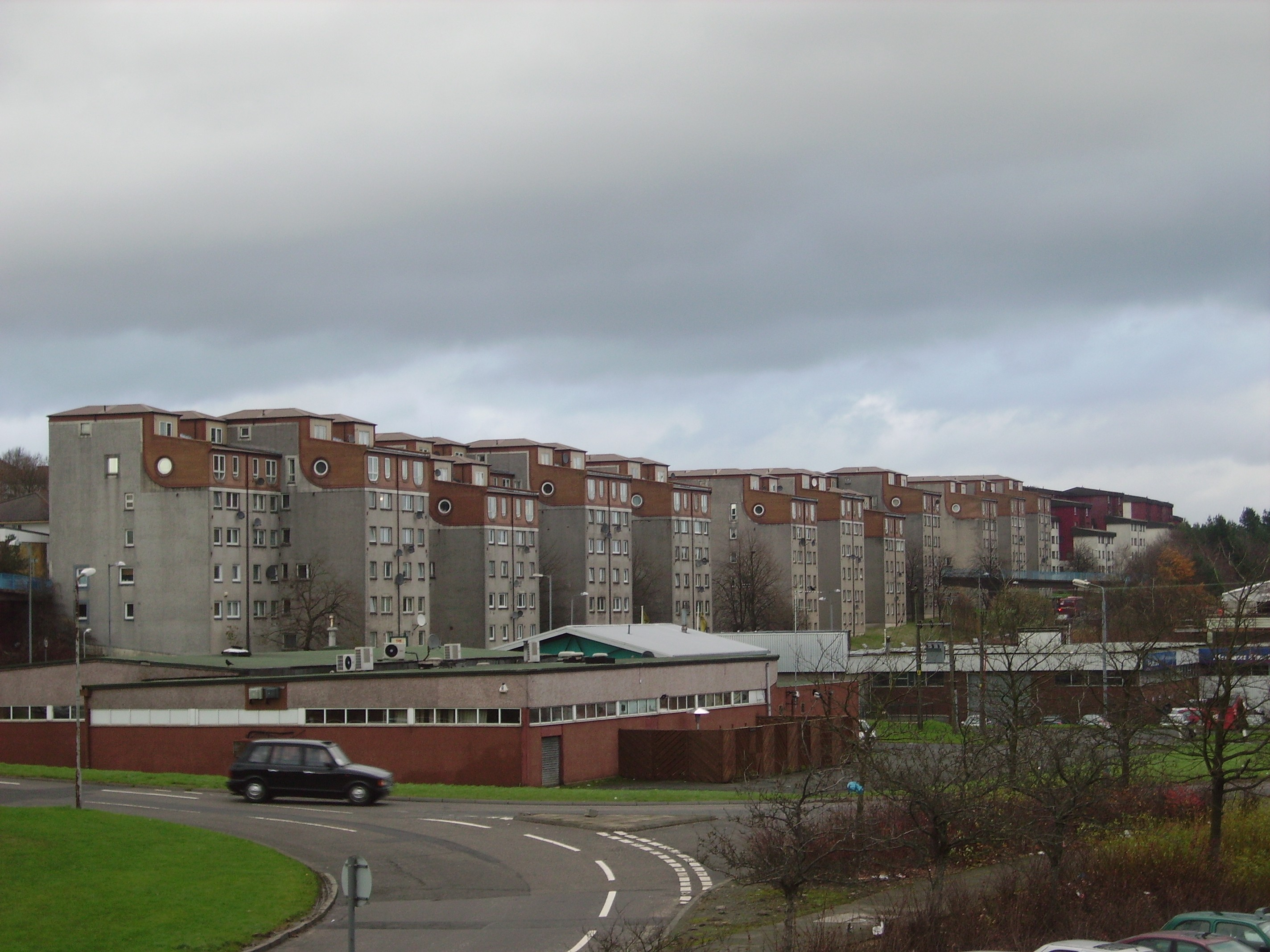
- South Carbrain's Greenrigg Road flats viewed from Cumbernauld railway station
- Council area: North Lanarkshire
- Lieutenancy area: Dunbartonshire
- Country: Scotland
- Sovereign state: United Kingdom
- Post town: GLASGOW
- Postcode district: G67
- Dialling code: 01236
- Police: Scotland
- Fire: Scottish
- Ambulance: Scottish
- UK Parliament: Cumbernauld, Kilsyth and Kirkintilloch East (UK Parliament constituency)
- Scottish Parliament: Cumbernauld and Kilsyth

Carbrain /kar 'bren/ is a neighbourhood in Cumbernauld, North Lanarkshire in Scotland. It gets a brief mention on William Roy's eighteenth century map of the Scottish Lowlands. In the nineteenth century it was no more than a farm steading. An early map shows just a few buildings existed in 1864. By the start of the First World War it had not grown significantly, although there was a school near the railway station. It was sometimes spelled Carbrane. Even in 1956 Carbrain was mostly farmland with a small burn flowing through it. The map seems to show this flowing possibly down the Gully and eventually feeding the Red Burn in the Vault Glen. This burn isn't named so can't be identified with the Horseward Burn from historic maps.

Derek Lyddon and James Latimer designed much of the housing in the 1960s. Construction of Cumbernauld began in 1963, and most areas of Carbrain were inhabited by the early 1970s. For the first several years, Carbrain was considered to be highly desirable as an escape from poor housing in the Glasgow area. As newer developments have been constructed in the Cumbernauld area, Carbrain has fallen into disrepair despite periods of renovation. For example, over £70 million was spent building new houses around Beechwood Court watched over by Andy Scott's artwork Vitruvian Girl. Most recently there have been proposals to renovate Millcroft Road.

Carbrain contains ten residential areas (Carbrain 1, 2, 3 & 4, 5, 6, 9, 11, 12, 13, 14), four churches (Carbrain Baptist Church, Cumbernauld Free Church, Cumbernauld United Reformed Church and St. Joseph's), two pubs (The Twa Corbies and The Jack Snipe), several local shops located throughout the site, along with a number of community buildings like the Red Cross Centre. Carbrain is supposed to have the Town Centre as its focus, so there was thought to be no need for serious scale entertainment or grocery shops.

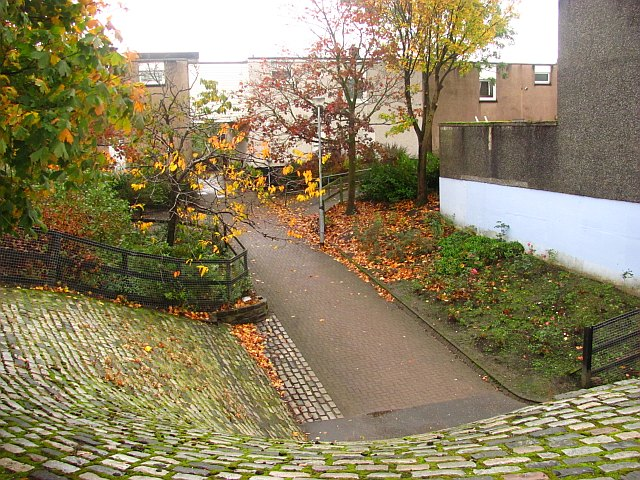
Underpasses between Glenhove and Torbrex Roads

Carbrain was split into two sections: North and South. North Carbrain, which was built first, included Glenhove Road, Torbrex Road, Stonylee Road, Craigieburn Road, Beechwood Road and Glenacre Road. North Carbrain is within five minutes walking distance from the Town Centre, health centre and sports centre. South Carbrain includes Millcroft Road, Greenrigg Road, Kilbowie Road, Broomlands Road, and Sandyknowes, some of which are a five-minute walk from the train station. The town centre is approximately a ten-minute walk from South Carbrain.

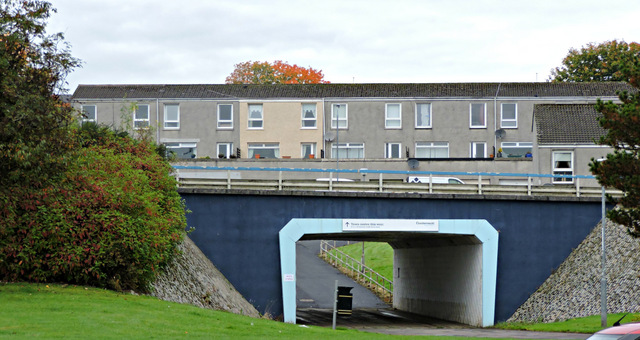
View from Train Station to South Carbrain

Carbrain was designed around pedestrians and, as such, has paths intertwining among its many streets. It is possible to get from one part of Carbrain to another using only footpaths. It was also designed so that pedestrians never had to walk alongside or cross a road.

Hillcrest was never part of Carbrain although Carbrain Temporary School became, the now demolished, Hillcrest Primary in 1971. For that reason there is a community council for "Carbrain and Hillcrest" rather than just Carbrain.

There were three primary schools within this area. Most children who lived in these areas would have attended Langlands Primary, St Joseph's Primary or Carbrain Primary (which celebrated its 50th birthday in 2016). These primaries were feeder schools for Cumbernauld High School, Greenfaulds High School or Our Lady's High School. St Margaret of Scotland Primary replaced St Joseph's Primary during a period of reorganisation.

Carbrain Boys Club is a voluntary football club who are organising a festival in June 2017.

== On film and TV ==
1. In Peter Mullan's 1998 film Orphans some of the scenes were shot in Torbrex Road and other sites in North Carbrain.
2. Craig Ferguson returns to Cumbernauld High School and his old haunts in Torbrex Road. (Craig Ferguson 5/16/12A Late Late Show in Scotland).

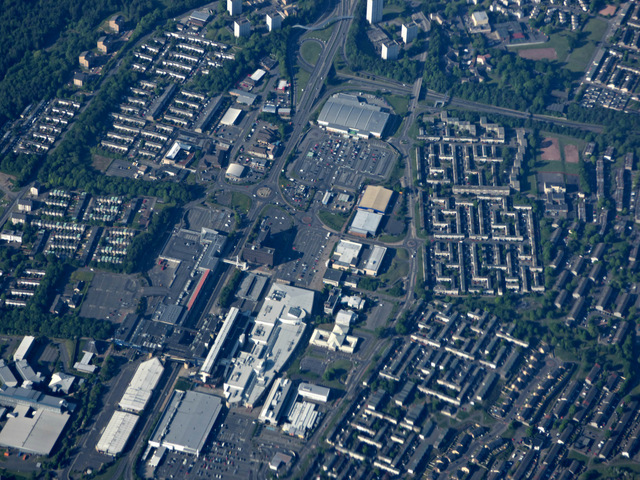
Cumbernauld town centre with South Carbrain to the right from the air
