= Abronhill =

Area of Cumbernauld, Scotland

Coordinates: 55.963°N 3.947°W

Abronhill: Scottish Gaelic: Cnoc Abraim
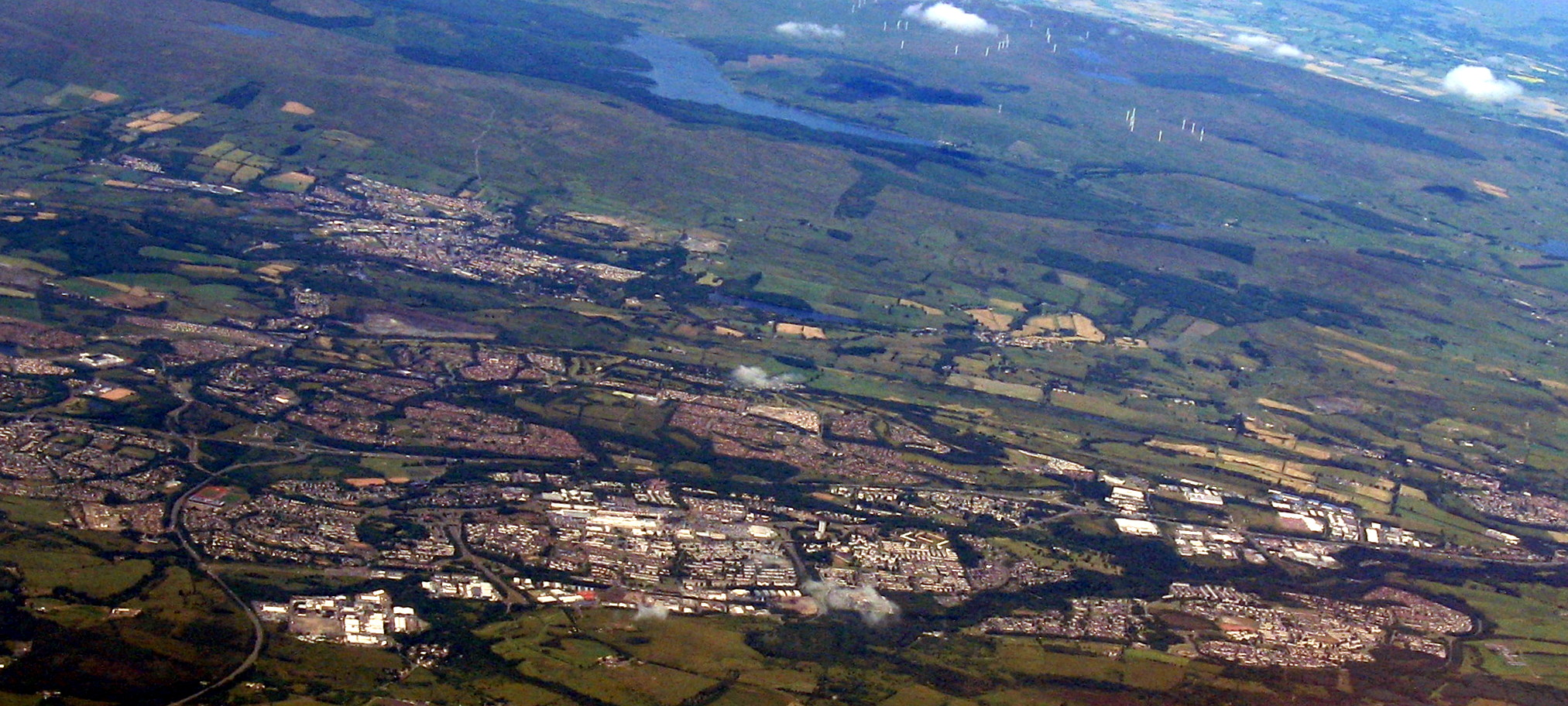
- Abronhill and Whitelees in Cumbernauld

- Location within North Lanarkshire
- OS grid reference: NS785762
- Council area: North Lanarkshire
- Lieutenancy area: Dunbartonshire
- Country: Scotland
- Sovereign state: United Kingdom
- Post town: GLASGOW
- Postcode district: G67
- Dialling code: 01236
- Police: Scotland
- Fire: Scottish
- Ambulance: Scottish
- UK Parliament: Cumbernauld and Kirkintilloch
- Scottish Parliament: Cumbernauld and Kilsyth

Abronhill (/eɪˈbrɒnhɪl/) is an area in the north-east of Cumbernauld, North Lanarkshire, Scotland. It extends one to two miles (two to three kilometres) from Cumbernauld Town Centre. Abronhill was planned with its own shopping centre and has three primary schools, along with several churches. Abronhill has 41 streets. Abronhill, and particularly the (now-demolished) Abronhill High School, (shut down in 2014 with secondary pupils now attending Cumbernauld Academy), were used extensively as the filming location for Bill Forsyth's 1981 film Gregory's Girl and its sequel Gregory's Two Girls.

All of the roads in the older part of Abronhill were named after trees, for example Cedar Road, and Oak Road. This is in contrast to other parts of the New Town where historic local placenames or famous Scots or their art were incorporated into the street names.

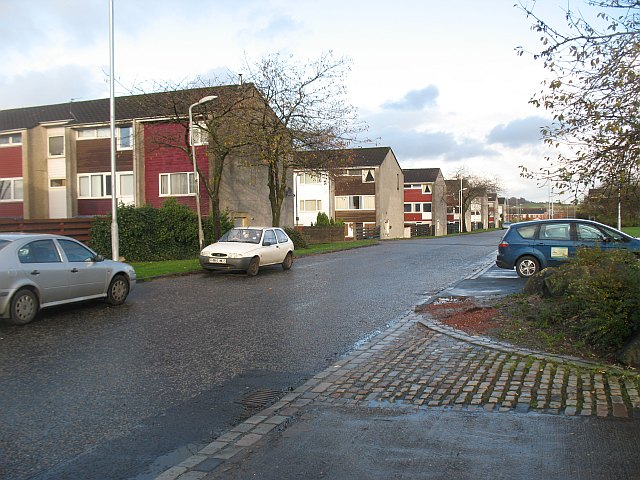
Pine Road, Abronhill

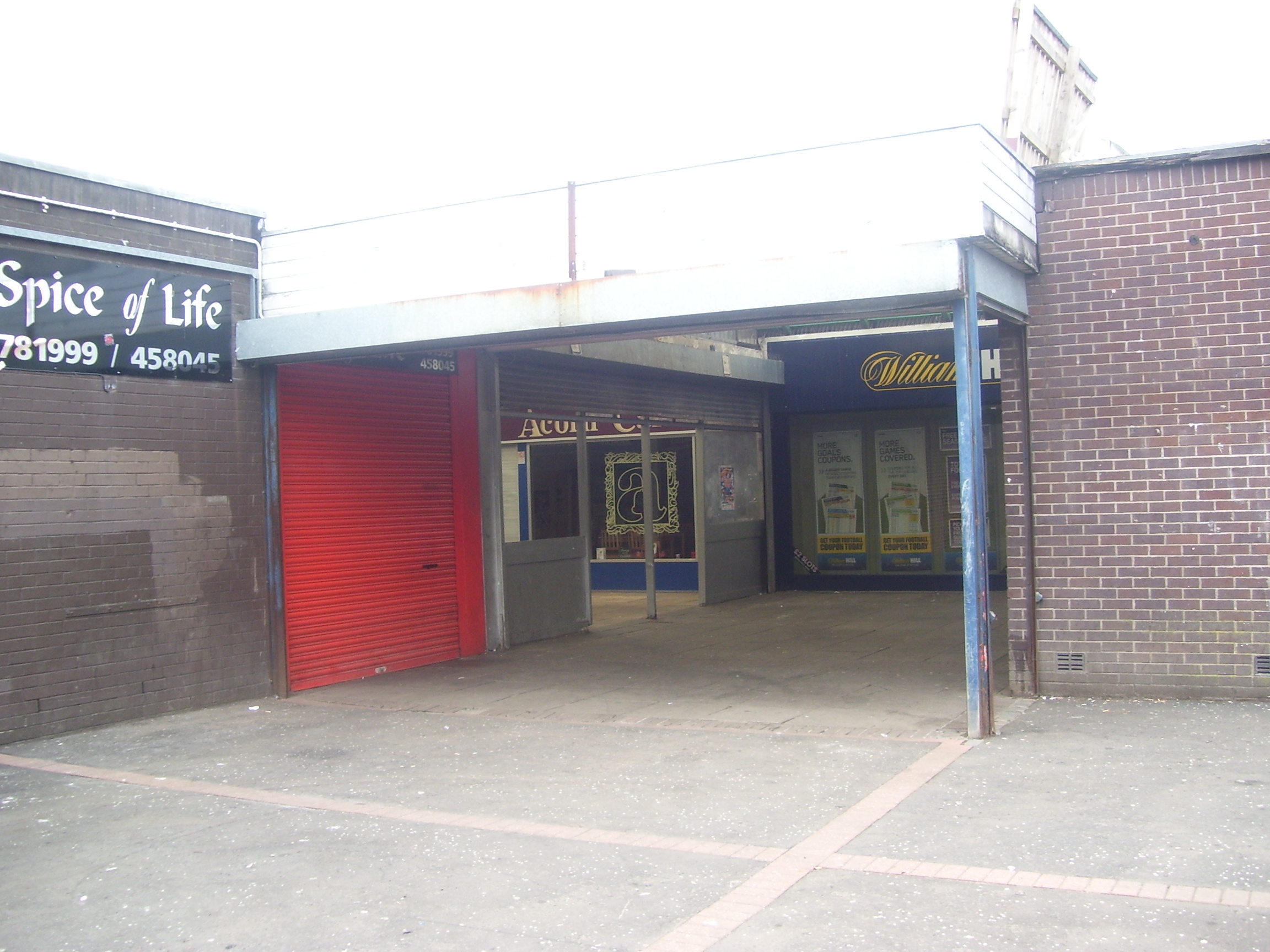
Abronhill Shopping Mall

Abronhill, along with Condorrat and The Village, is one of the parts of Cumbernauld with buildings which pre-date the New Town although Abronhill was very small even compared to those modest settlements. Condorrat, the Village, Arns (near Abronhill see an old map) and Garbethill all had schools in the 19th century.

The area around modern Abronhill is still mainly farmland and woodland, although there is a new housing estate with 600 homes due to be built to the north of Forest Rd . Palacerigg Country Park and Fannyside Lochs are nearby. There is also a small shopping centre, but this is falling into disrepair which has upset some of the residents. Abronhill has expanded in recent years with the development of Whitelees, which boasts its own primary school and housing estate, and Cherry Avenue which is built on the site of the former Glenhead primary school. This school was originally St.Lucy's RC Primary School, however, falling roll at the nearby non-denominational Glenhead Primary School, saw the two schools swap locations.

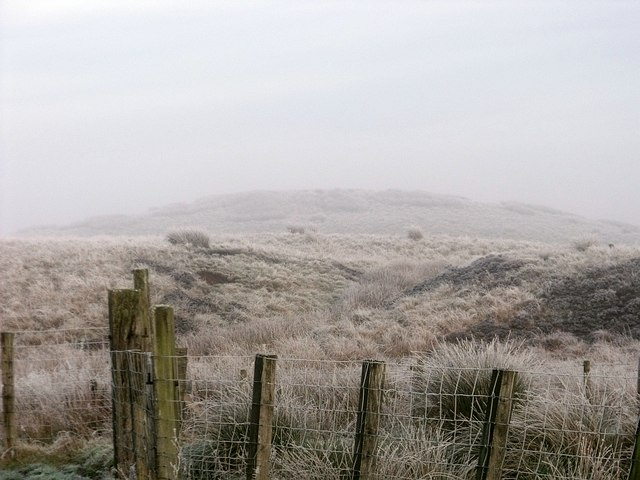
Herd's Hill, West Fannyside, named after Covenanting lookout man

The name Abronhill comes from the 17th century, during the Wars of the Three Kingdoms, when the area was named Abraham the Hebrew's Hill by the Covenanters. The name gradually changed to Abram's Hill and then to Abronhill. There was a period in Scotland when it was a capital offense to preach at unauthorized religious assemblies so the Covenanters chose meeting places like this hilltop with an eye on escape. Ringleaders caught at these banned meetings would face the boot, or thumbscrews, or worse during the period known as The Killing Time. The death penalty was imposed on those who refused to swear an oath deliberately designed offend their conscience. Field executions were authorized so there were no lengthy trials. Locally covenanters were also reported to have met at Herd's Hill on Fannyside to worship without the king's restrictions. At least two local farmers had all their property confiscated at trials they did not attend.

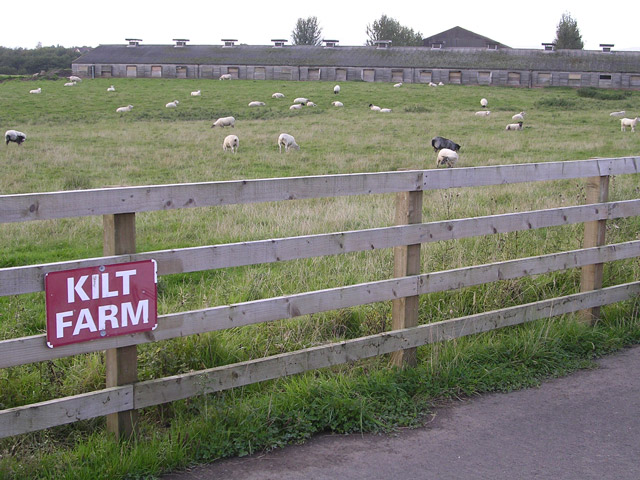
Kilt Farm, near the Walton Burn, Abronhill

Until the New Town's development, the land that is now Abronhill was occupied by farms such as Whitelees, Glenhead, Low Abronhill and High Abronhill. These farms had developed from the Fleming estate; the Flemings were the ruling family in the area, living at Cumbernauld Castle. They acquired the estate after Robert the Bruce murdered the previous laird, Red Comyn. The four original Abronhill cottages were from before the new town arrived. They were built for the workers of the nearby farms, and are situated on the old Slamannan Road which ran from Wardpark through the Glen and all the way to Slamannan. The site can still be found close to Cumbernauld Glen on what's now known as Broom Road. Nearby is the Dovecote (Doocot in Scots), a 16th-century historical site of interest, which was part of the original Flemming's estate. This received a grant to be renovated from North Lanarkshire's Environmental Key Fund via the Scottish Wildlife Trust. Other local industry which pre-dates the new town includes weaving and mining. Entrances to old mines can be seen at the Glen and other places around the area.

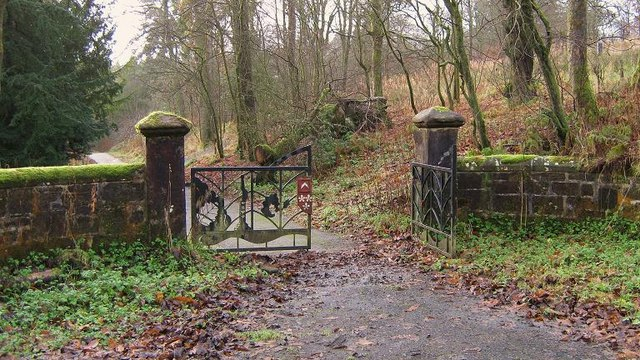
Entering the Glen from Broom Rd, Abronhill near the Dovecote

To the west of Abronhill and separating it from Kildrum is a deep geographical divide called the Vault Glen. Through the Vault Glen runs a river, a pipeline which carries sewage and the railway line. The river, initially called the Glencryan Burn, starts from Fannyside Lochs and runs through Glencryan Reservoir and down to Forest Road, the main road to Abronhill. The river then runs under the road and its name changes to The Red Burn on the other side, behind Cumbernauld Academy. (On older maps the river was sometimes still called Glencryan Burn for part of its way through the Vault Glen). There are four footbridges connecting Abronhill with the rest of the town: one on either side of Cumbernauld Academy, one close to Abronhill Primary School and one at Broom Road. This Red Burn is the one from which Cumbernauld's Gaelic name is derived. There is a gruesome story about how the Red Burn (or Redburn) itself was named. It involves the killing of Roman soldiers whose bodies were dumped in the river at Castlecary making it run red.

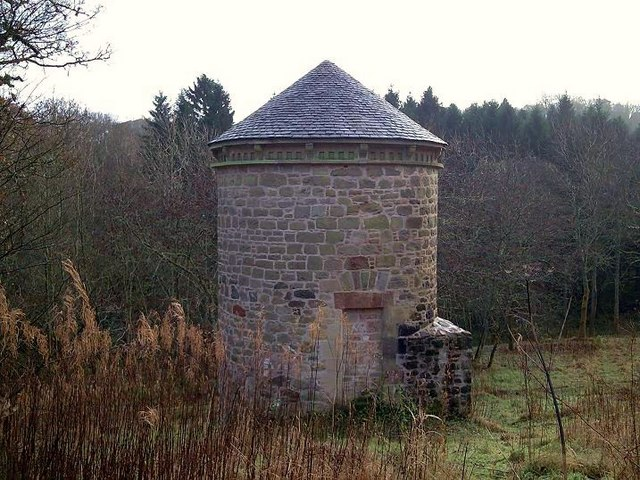
Dovecote (pronounced Doo'cot), Vault Glen near Broom Rd.
