= Cumbernauld Academy =

Location
- South Kildrum Ring Road; Cumbernauld, North Lanarkshire, G67 2UF; Scotland; 55°56′54″N 3°58′09″W

Information
- Type: Secondary school
- Motto: Virtute Ac Labore (Latin: 'Virtue through Hard Work')
- Established: 2014
- Status: Open
- Local authority: North Lanarkshire
- Head Teacher: Mark Cairns
- Staff: 60.2 FTE
- Gender: Coeducational
- Age: 11 to 18
- Enrolment: c 900
- Houses: Islay; Arran; Skye
- Colours: Black, Purple, Blue
- Website: https://blogs.glowscotland.org.uk/nl/CAcad/

Cumbernauld Academy (formerly Cumbernauld High School) is a comprehensive secondary school in Cumbernauld, Scotland. The original Cumbernauld High School was designed by Scottish architects Gratton & McLean and it opened in 1964 as a non-denominational, co-educational, secondary school. In 2013, North Lanarkshire Council announced the amalgamation of Cumbernauld High with Abronhill High to become Cumbernauld Academy in a new building to be built on existing CHS grounds.

== Overview ==
Cumbernauld Academy is a non-denominational, secondary school in Cumbernauld. It replaced Cumbernauld High School (CHS), as an entity, in 2013. A new school was subsequently built on the substantial grounds of CHS and has a capacity of around 1100 pupils. There are three houses in the school; all are named after Scottish islands: Arran, Islay and Skye.

Built at a cost of £37 million it includes the new Cumbernauld Theatre; it was officially opened on Friday 16 August 2019. The campus replaced the old Cumbernauld High School which is now demolished. The school was built under the project delivery method by Scotland Hub South West and Morrison Construction.

The crest Contains the letters "C" and "A" which stand for "Cumbernauld Academy." It also has the letters "MMXIV" which is the Roman numeral for 2014, the year the school was established.

In July 2022, Cumbernauld Academy received the Gold award from LGBT Youth Scotland. This made it the second school in North Lanarkshire to do so.

=== The Catholic Truth ===
After Cumbernauld Academy won an LGBT Silver award from LGBT Youth Scotland, an ultra-conservative site called Catholic Truth wrote to the head teacher, Mark Cairns, claiming students were being brainwashed.

The letter said: “Given the fact that “safe spaces” are being provided in Catholic schools for LGBT pupils afraid of bullying because of their “orientation”, would you let me know if you are providing “safe spaces” for Catholic pupils and, indeed, others who may find themselves bullied for having reservations about or not approving of same-sex relationships?

“And would you please also advise which materials are in use to explain the specific health risks of homosexual activity?”

In response, a spokesperson from LGBT Youth Scotland said: “Research is showing that 71% of LGBT young people experiencing bullying on the ground of being LGBT and 9% of LGBT leaving education as result.

“We are not aware of research which shows that a high number of people who do not agree with same-sex relationships are being bullied within schools. Indeed it is wrong to assume that Catholic pupils are not supportive of same-sex relationships.”

“The rest of the letter implies that by taking steps to be LGBT inclusive schools will encourage people to be LGBT. Sexual orientation and transgender identity are an intrinsic part of people's identities and lives. No one can encourage it or promote it.”

=== Kindness Lockers ===
Cumbernauld Academy has Kindess Lockers to help struggling pupils in a discreet way. There are 5 Kindness Lockers in the school. Students at Cumbernauld Academy can pick up a key and take something out if they need it while more fortunate pupils can put something in. Some things offered in the lockers are food (instant noodles, beans, cans of soup, etc.), toiletries (body washes, deodorants, toothpaste, etc.), or clothes (tights, socks, hats, gloves, etc.).

== History ==
Cumbernauld High School (CHS) was the first comprehensive secondary school in the then 'New Town' of Cumbernauld. It was designed by Scottish architects Gratton & McLean and it opened in 1964. It is a non-denominational, co-educational, secondary school. In 2013, North Lanarkshire Council announced amalgamation of Cumbernauld High with Abronhill High to become Cumbernauld Academy in a new building to be built on existing CHS grounds. Subsequently, a new build, Cumbernauld Academy was opened in 2019 and CHS subsequently demolished.

Cumbernauld High School opened in 1964 and covered the Scottish education system's stages S1 to S6. It had the capacity for around 1100 pupils. However, it reached a peak of around 1600 pupils in 1972. Latterly, before amalgamation with Abronhill High School in 2013, the roll was around 600. The school drew students from Cumbernauld and the surrounding area including Cumbernauld Village, Kildrum, Abronhill, Carbrain, Seafar, Castlecary, Westerwood, Dullatur, Craigmarloch, Carrickstone Vale, whitelees and Airdrie. Its associated feeder primary schools are Carbrain primary, Cumbernauld primary, Kildrum primary and Ravenswood primary.

The school was situated in a large area to the south of the Kildrum Ring Road. It was bordered on the east and backs onto extensive woodland. The predominantly brick-built structure formed around the Robert Burns building which consisted of three tower blocks and houses most of the classrooms. These blocks were latterly now known as A, B and C Blocks. In the past these were referred to as Boys, Girls and Senior Blocks respectively, with each having its own dining room. The James Watt building housed the technical workshops and classrooms. The David Livingstone building housed the science labs, art and home economics classrooms. There were also extensive playing fields and indoor sports facilities, including a swimming pool.

Built in the early 1960s, it was designed to accommodate the needs of the rapidly swelling population of Cumbernauld and was a large school with places for over 1000 pupils. As the Cumbernauld Development Corporation's first secondary school, it was finished to an exceptionally high standard for the era, with teak and mahogany used widely throughout.

Pupils attended from the surrounding villages including Luggiebank and Castlecary and after the closure of Twechar Primary School's Junior Secondary Department in 1966, pupils were sent to Cumbernauld High School until the new Kirkintilloch High School opened in 1972.

== Notable former pupils ==
- Craig Ferguson, comedian, host of The Late Late Show with Craig Ferguson
- Jimmy McCulloch, musician, member of Paul McCartney and Wings
- Isobel Buchanan, opera singer
- Lynn Ferguson, comedian
- Gregg McClymont, former Member of Parliament, Cumbernauld, Kilsyth and Kirkintilloch East
- Mark McGhee, Scottish footballer.
- Gordon MacDonald, Member of the Scottish Parliament, Edinburgh Pentlands
- Bristow Muldoon, former Member of the Scottish Parliament
- Scott Meenagh, Paralympic athlete.

== Notable former teachers ==
- Margaret Ewing, MP East Dunbartonshire 1974–9, MP Moray 1987–2001, MSP Moray 1999-2005
- Liz Lochhead, poet and dramatist
