= Castle Cary Castle =

15th-century tower house in Scotland

Coordinates: 55°58′31″N 3°56′45″W

- Castlecary, North Lanarkshire, Scotland
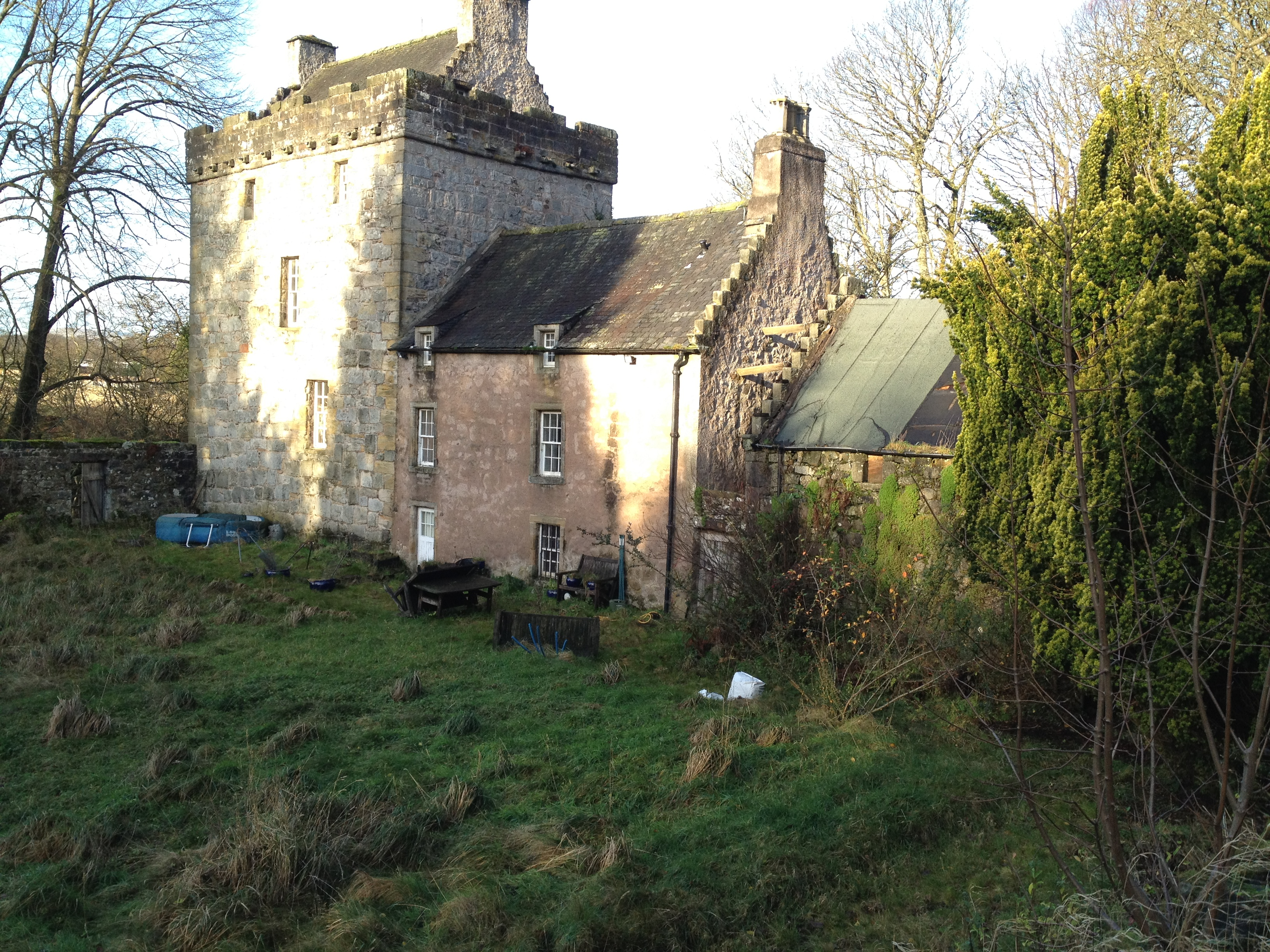
- Castle Cary Castle, south façade

Site information
- Type: Tower house
- Owner: Private
- Open to the public: No
- Condition: Partially preserved

Location

Site history
- Built: 15th century

Castle Cary Castle (sometimes called Castlecary Castle) is a fifteenth-century tower house near Castlecary, about 6 miles (10 km) from Falkirk in Scotland. It is less than 3 miles from Cumbernauld Village. It is located near to the site of one of the principal Roman forts of the Antonine Wall.

== History ==
The earliest known record of Castlecary may be from 1304 when a writ was sent from St Andrews to the sheriff of Stirling by King Edward I. It reportedly contained orders for the sheriff to bring all of the forces under his command to 'Chastel Kary'. There are some Latin texts of unknown date which state that Grahames Dyke "goes directly to the Forrest of Commernald, and there is a great Fort and great building called Castle Kæney."

The tower, about 12 metres (40 ft) high, is thought have been built by Henry Livingstone of Myddillbynning being completed by 1480. Mary Queen of Scots is reported to have visited the castle with Mary Livingston and each to have planted a yew tree there. For the 16th and the early part of the 17th centuries it belonged to the Livingstones of Dunipace, and was then acquired by the Baillies. In 1730, the castle passed to Thomas Dunbar of Fingask, through his marriage to Bethia Baillie.

The castle was burned by a party of Jacobites during the 1715 rebellion. Later it was restored and today the site is a private residence with no public access. The antiquary Alexander Baillie was probably born in Castle Cary Castle, and it was from this castle that his sister, Lizzie, eloped with Donald Graham, a Highland farmer, by leaping into his plaid (Belted plaid). The castle later became the property of the Marquess of Zetland.

== Description ==
The castle originated as a rectangular tower with a lower wing, forming an L-shape, and was built from in the late 15th century, incorporating stone from the nearby Antonine fort. The antiquarian Hugo B. Millar, who lived there, claimed there were many such 'broached' stones all over the castle, and in other walls about the garden. The original wing was destroyed, then during the 17th century, a wing was added to the east of the tower; it bears the date 1679. This was two storeys high, and had an attic, as well as a turnpike stair. Both the main tower and the extension have a pitched roof and crow-stepped gables, and the original tower has a restored parapet which is crenellated. There is a machicolated projection at the east end of the north wall, at parapet level, although its defensive value would have been limited, as it was not placed above the entrance. It is, however, more likely that this feature is a Garderobe.

A turnpike stair leads from the north entrance to the parapet, where there is a cap-house from which the attic may be entered. There is a barrel-vaulted cellar on the ground floor. Traces of 18th century wall painting may be seen in the Hall, which also has the bases and moulded jambs of the fireplace. An iron grille, part of the original defences of the door, is preserved within.

Beneath the 17th-century extension, there is a 7.5-metre-wide (25 ft) ditch which was filled in for the construction of the wing. It may have been contemporary with the 1485 structure.

== In art ==
A painting featuring Castlecary Castle by George Gibson is displayed in Callendar House in Falkirk.

There is a tradition that Lizzie of Castlecary jumped out a third-storey castle window to abscond with her lover Donald Graham. Lizzie's father, a 'noted antiquarian' strongly disapproved of her suitor. There are a couple versions of a song recorded about this one by Hugh Baird who states that the story is sometimes confused with that of Mary of Castlecary. Baird's whole book is about Castlecary.
