= Westerwood =

Area of Cumbernauld, Scotland

Coordinates: 55.9672°N 3.9897°W

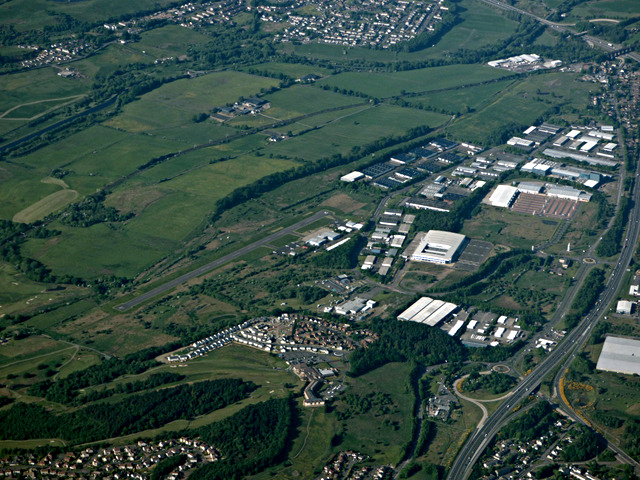
Westerwood between Carrickstone and Wardpark North close to Cumbernauld Airport

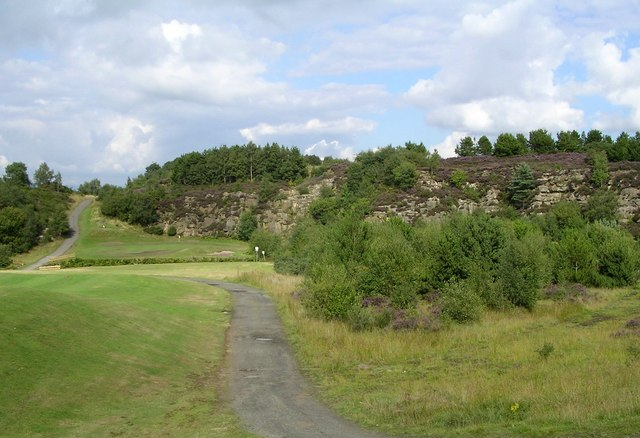
Westerwood Golf Course

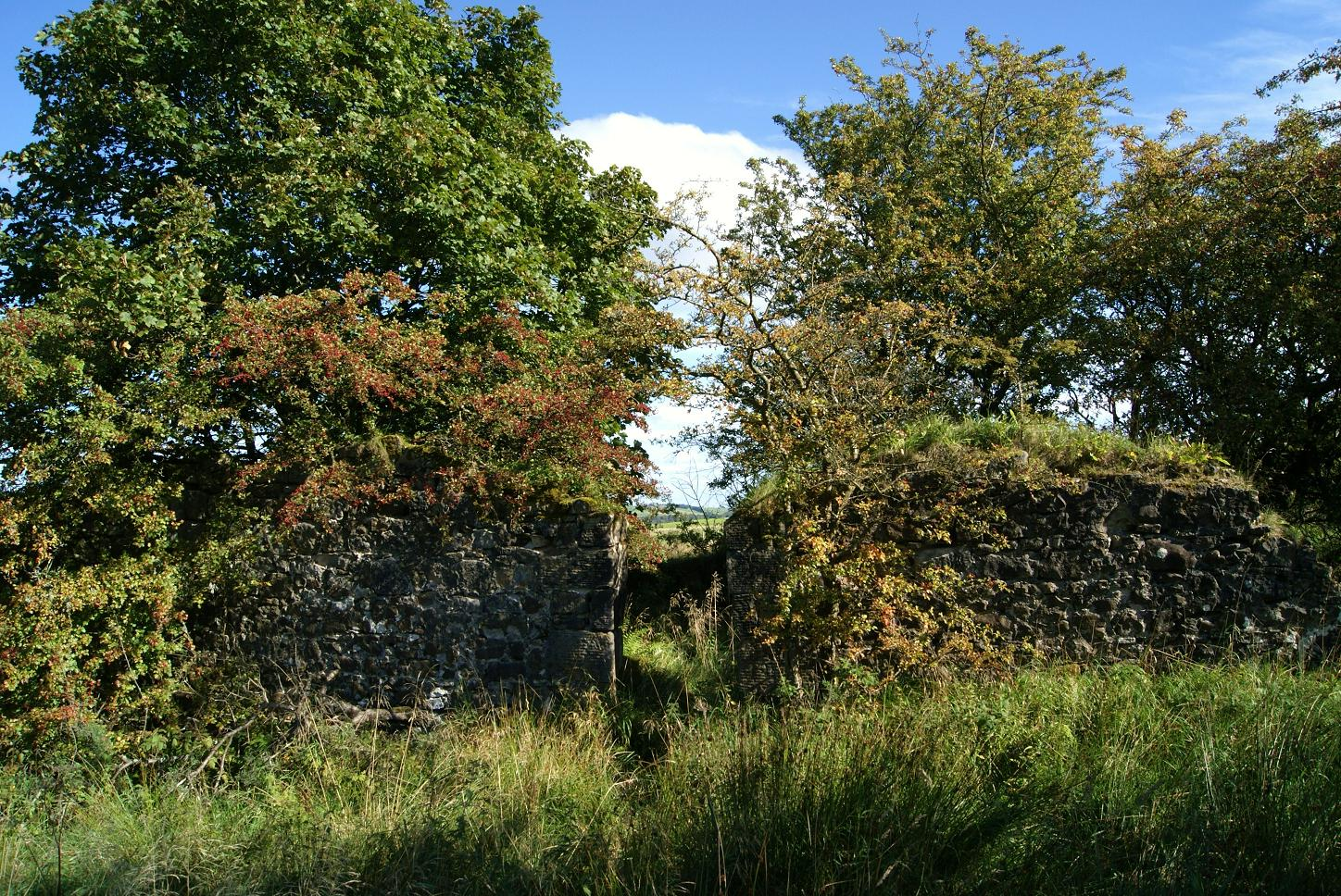
ruin of Arniebog Farmhouse

Westerwood is an area in the north-east of Cumbernauld in North Lanarkshire, Scotland. Historically it was the site of a Roman Fort of which a video reconstruction has been produced. In the past two decades, new housing developments have been built around the Westerwood Hotel and Golf Course. The golf course, which was designed by Seve Ballesteros and Dave Thomas, is located on the north side of the town, close to Cumbernauld Airport. Westerwood Community Council was set up for local residents and a committee has been appointed. Neighbouring villages which are outside of Cumbernauld include Dullatur to the north-west and Castlecary to the east.

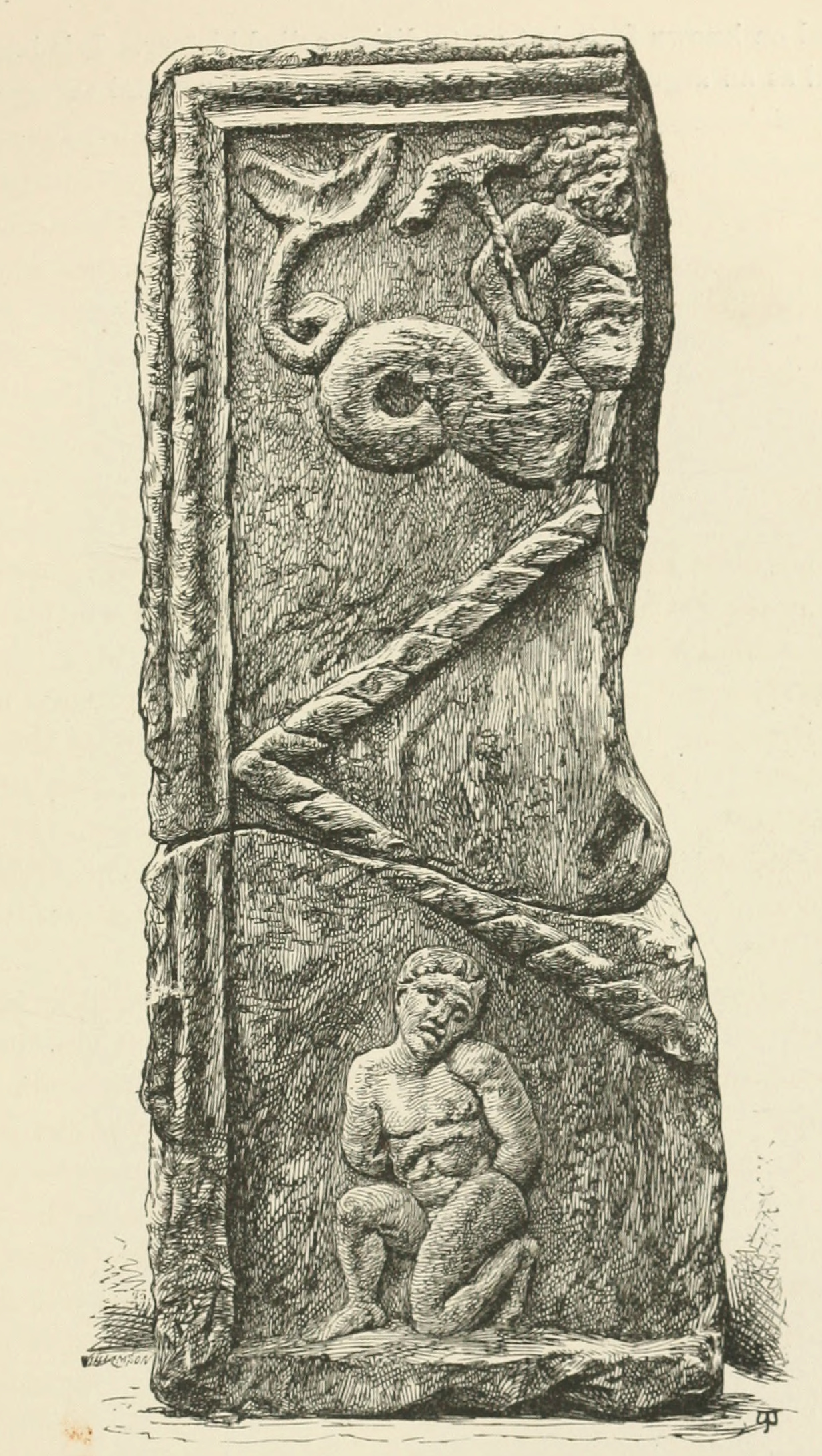
Uncredited artist's sketch of distance slab found at Arniebog Farm, Westerwood, Cumbernauld. Miss Christian Maclagan attempted to buy it and produced a sketch of it in ink. It has been scanned and a video produced.

== Roman Heritage ==
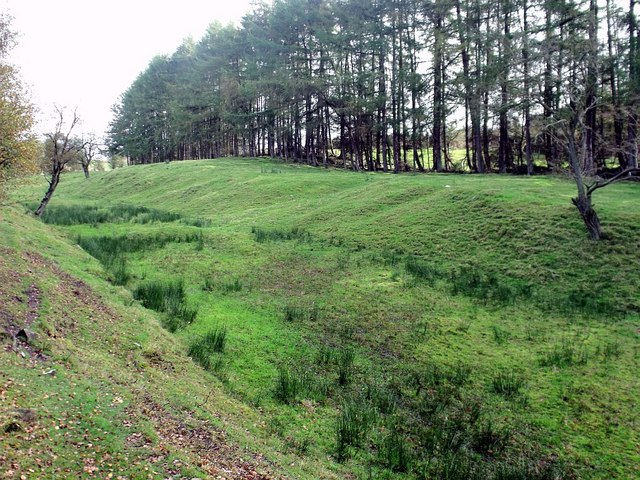
Antonine Wall near Westerwood

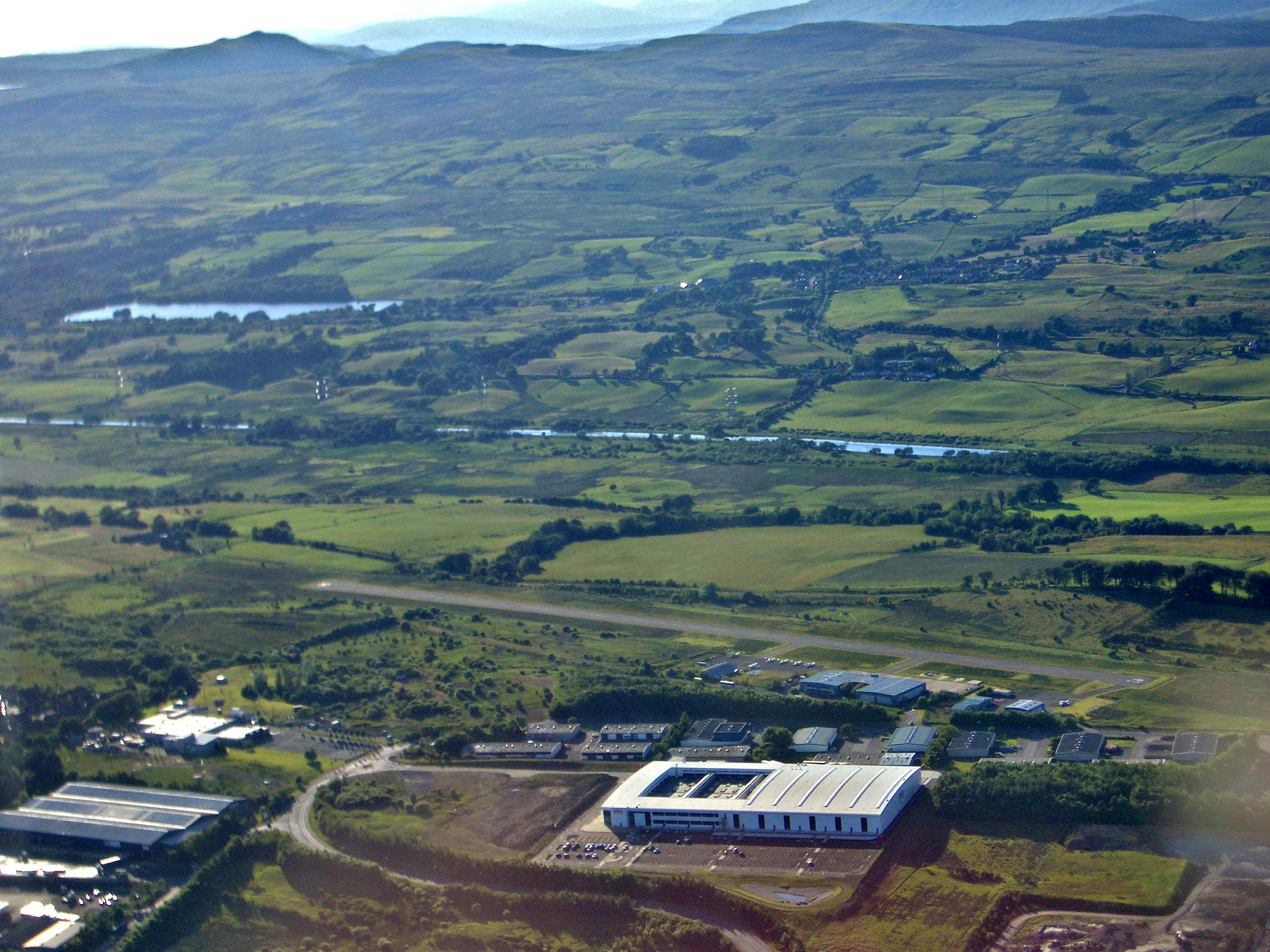
Bottom right to top left: Wardpark, Cumbernauld Airport, Arniebog Farm, Military Way (Antonine Wall), Westerwood Golf Course, the Forth and Clyde canal, Banton Loch (Townhead Reservoir), the Campsie Fells.

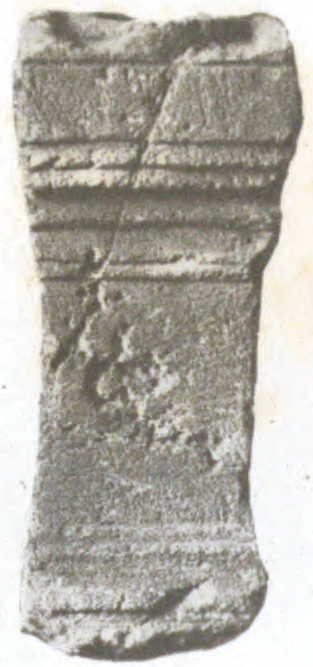
Uninscribed altar from Arniebog Farm, Westerwood, Cumbernauld

Historically, Westerwood is the site of a Roman Fort on the Antonine Wall. Its neighbouring forts were Croy Hill to the west and Castlecary to the east. At Tollpark, is one of the best preserved continuous sections of the whole Wall, between the forts of Castlecary and Westerwood. There may have been a signal tower at Garnhall from where both Westerwood and Castlecary forts are likely to have been visible. A kissing gate behind Castlecary Hotel provides access to this section of the wall to the east. Parking for the section of the wall to the west can be found at Dullatur or Croy. Many Roman forts along the wall held garrisons of around 500 men. Larger forts like Castlecary and Birrens had a nominal cohort of 1000 men but probably sheltered women and children as well although the troops were not allowed to marry. There is also likely to have been large communities of civilians around the site. Westerwood was excavated in 1932 by Sir George Macdonald who wrote about it. It was also excavated in 1974 and 1985-8. Finds near Westerwood include a distance slab depicting a sea-deity and a naked, tied, captive and an uninscribed altar which were found at Arniebog. The slab can now be viewed at the Hunterian Museum, Glasgow. Other artefacts include a diamond patterned stone and a grey, buff jar. A religious stone showed a relief of an engorged phallus over the inscription EX VOTO "the result of a vow". It was found in 1725 but has since been lost. It had a second inscription: NVX "the night". Also a centurion called Verecundus, and his wife, dedicated an altar to Silvanus and the Sky which was recovered at Westerwood. Pottery found at Westerwood is unlike any other pottery found on the Antonine Wall. It has been suggested that the course pottery was made locally by a single potter at Westerwood.

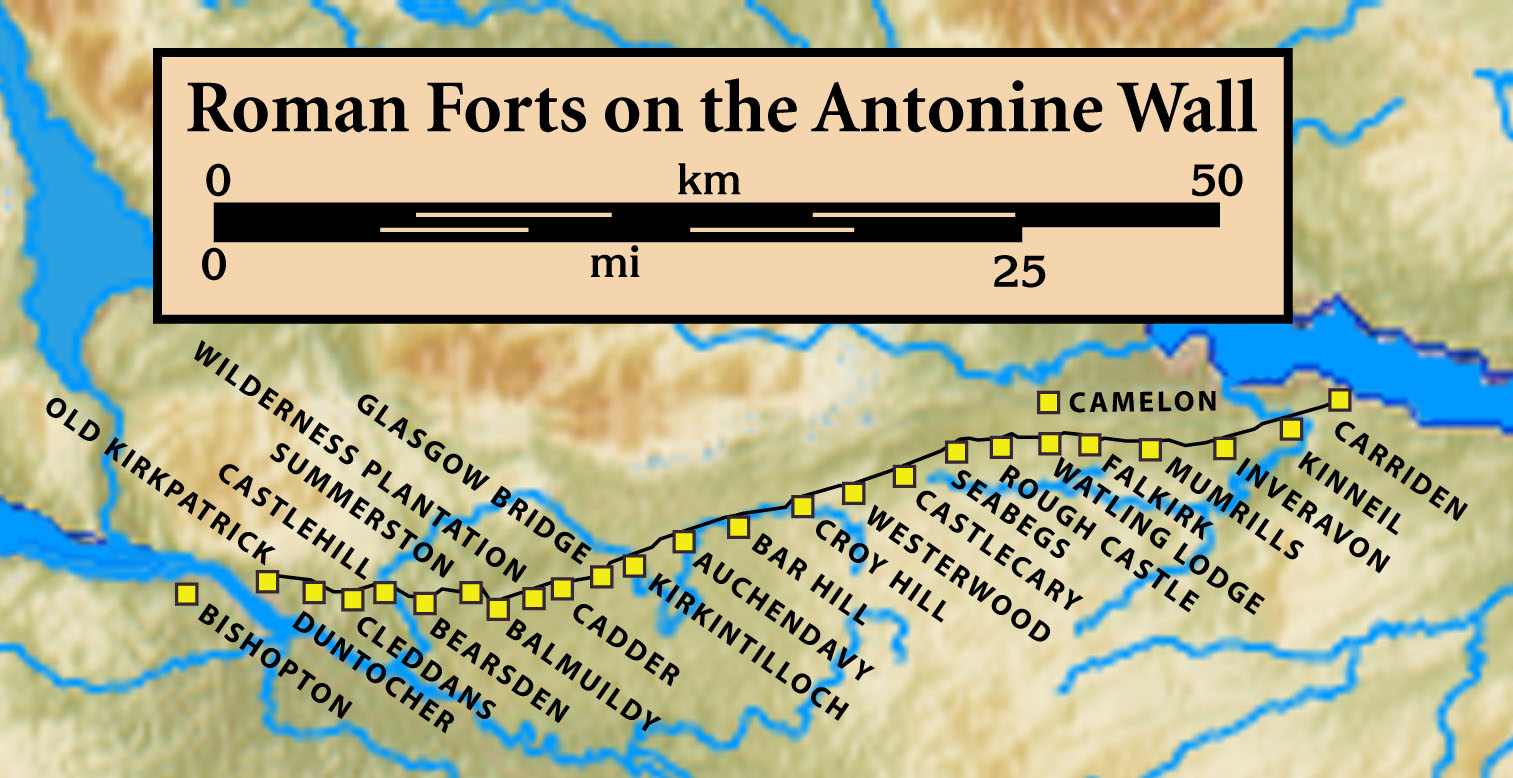
Forts and Fortlets associated with the Antonine Wall from west to east: Bishopton, Old Kilpatrick, Duntocher, Cleddans, Castlehill, Bearsden, Summerston, Balmuildy, Wilderness Plantation, Cadder, Glasgow Bridge, Kirkintilloch, Auchendavy, Bar Hill, Croy Hill, Westerwood, Castlecary, Seabegs, Rough Castle, Camelon, Watling Lodge, Falkirk, Mumrills, Inveravon, Kinneil, Carriden
