= Cumbernauld Airport =

Airport in Scotland

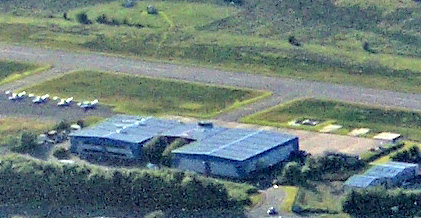
- IATA: none; ICAO: EGPG

Summary
- Airport type: Private
- Operator: Cumbernauld Airport Ltd
- Location: Cumbernauld, North Lanarkshire, Scotland
- Elevation AMSL: 348 ft / 106 m
- Coordinates: 55°58′29″N 003°58′32″W
- Website: www.cumbernauldairport.org

Map
- Location in North Lanarkshire

Runways
| Direction | Length | | Surface |
| Direction | m | ft | Surface |
|---|---|---|---|
| 07/25 | 819 | 2,687 | Asphalt |
- Sources: UK AIP at NATS

Cumbernauld Airport (ICAO: EGPG, FAA LID: CBN) is a general aviation airport located 13 miles (21 km) northeast of Glasgow at Cumbernauld in North Lanarkshire, Scotland. It serves as an important reliever airport for Glasgow Airport and Edinburgh Airport.

Users of Cumbernauld include primarily the training of fixed wing and rotary wing pilots; it also boasts a helicopter charter company and a light aircraft charter operation along with aircraft maintenance facility.

Cumbernauld Aerodrome has a CAA Ordinary Licence (Number P827) that allows flights for the public transport of passengers or for flying instruction as authorised by the licensee (Cormack Aircraft Services Limited).

== History ==
The new airport was opened by the Cumbernauld Development Corporation in the late 1980s. Before the new airport was constructed there was a grass strip in use on the same site. During the early years of the airport's new incarnation there was even an airshow, the highlight being a display by the Red Arrows and a mock dogfight between a Supermarine Spitfire and a German Messerschmitt Bf 109 fighter.

== Operators ==
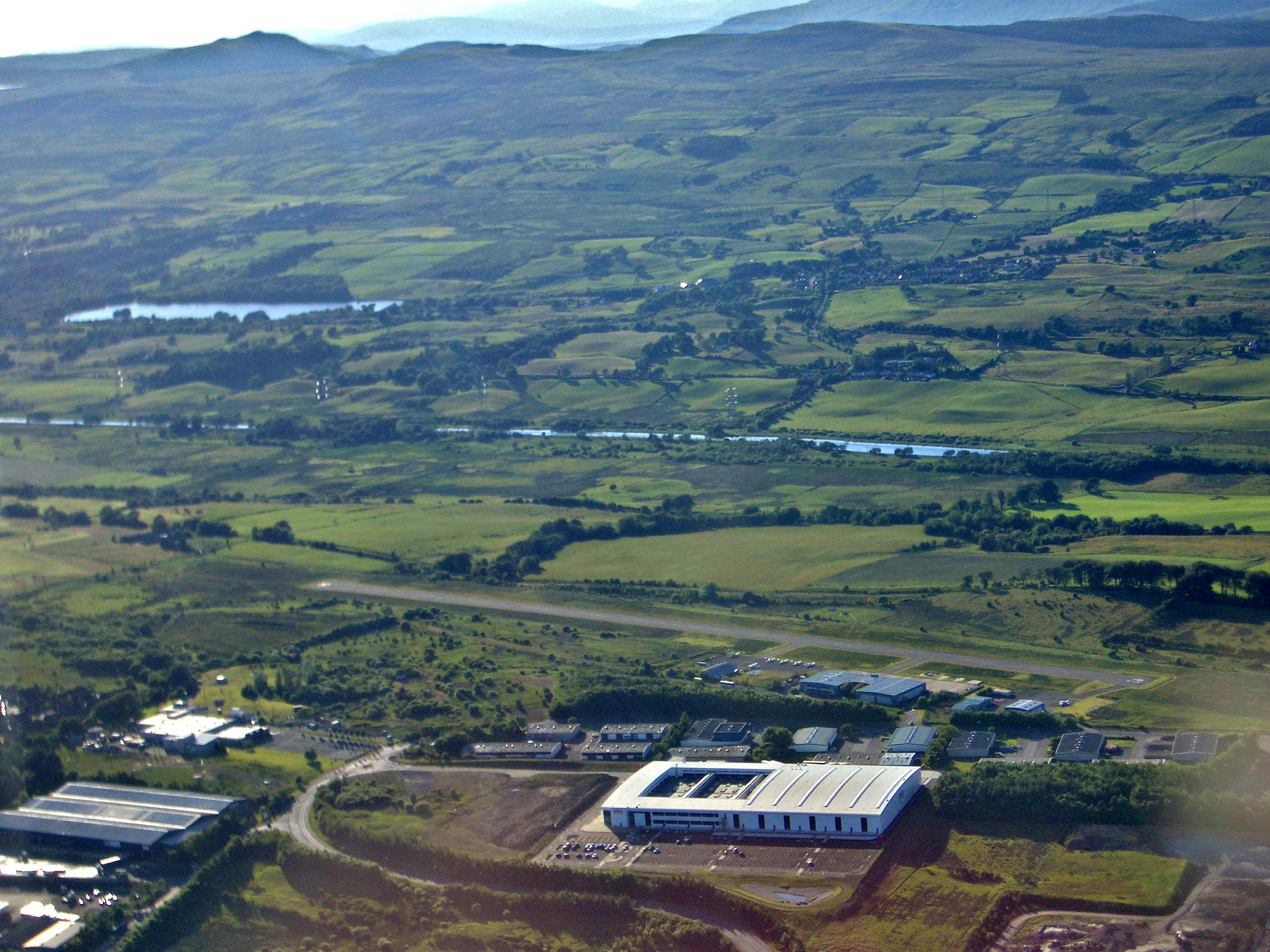
Cumbernauld airport runway strip can be seen around one-third of the way up, with the Campsie Fells in the background.

Training organisations: Phoenix Flight Training, Border Air Training,

Other Operators: PDG Helicopters (helicopter charters) and Hebridean Air Services (twin engine Britten-Norman Islander charter).

Maintenance Organisation: Cormack Islander Aircraft (Islander Aircraft Limited).

Also located on the airfield is the active West of Scotland strut of the Light Aircraft Association (formerly the Popular Flying Association).
