= Greenfaulds High School =

Location
- Auchenkilns Road; Cumbernauld, North Lanarkshire, G67 4AQ; Scotland; 55.9367°N 4.00735°W

Information
- Type: Secondary school
- Motto: Tak Tyme in Tyme
- Established: 1971
- Head Teacher: James Vaughn-Sharp
- Gender: Coeducational
- Age: 11 to 18
- Enrolment: 1450 (max capacity)
- Houses: Bruce; Wallace; Ness; Skye; Thistle; Lewis; Lomond
- Colours: Blue, white, yellow
- Website: blogs.glowscotland.org.uk/nl/ghshome

Greenfaulds High School is a mixed, non-denominational six-year comprehensive secondary school. The original building was opened in 1971, while the new building was first opened to the public on 29 September 2016, and the old building has now been demolished. Greenfaulds is situated in the west of Cumbernauld and provides a service to the Greenfaulds, Ravenswood, Condorrat, Westfield, Eastfield, Balloch, Craigmarloch areas and parts of Seafar. The Head Teacher is James Vaugh-Sharp. The current school building has a maximum capacity of 1,450 pupils, making it the largest school in the Lanarskhire area and one of the largest in Scotland. Greenfaulds has six associated primary schools, which are Baird Memorial, Condorrat, Eastfield, Ravenswood, Westfield, and Woodlands.

== Facilities ==
=== Subjects ===
The school teaches a wide variety of subjects, most of which are taught through first and second year. Some subjects are only taught as National 5 or Higher and above. Subjects include:

- English
- Performing Arts (Art, Music, Drama)
- Social Subjects (History, Modern Studies, Geography)
- Technical (Graphics, Design and Manufacturing, Woodworking)
- Modern Languages (French, Spanish, German, Scots Gaelic)
- Sciences (Biology, Chemistry, Psychology (16+), Environmental Science, Physics, )
- Health and Wellbeing (Home Economics, Physical Education, Personal Development)
- Computing (Computing Science, Accounting, Business Management, Admin & IT )

== New School Building ==
The new school building was opened to the public in September 2016, and the original building has been demolished. The total cost of the project, which includes the new building, as well as the sport facilities was an estimated £31.2 million. Although the building does not have a pool, it is equipped with sports facilities such as a tennis court, grass pitch, and running track. The running track contains other sport events such as long jump, javelin and discus. The sporting facilities were completed August 2017, in time for the new school year 2017–2018.

== Royal visit ==
- Greenfaulds High School had a visit from HLM Queen Elizabeth II in June 2019.
