= Ravenswood =

Ravenswood may refer to:

== Film, TV and literature ==
- Ravenswood/Hrefnesholt, the name of a Swedish forest in Beowulf, the setting of a battle between Geats and Swedes
- Ravenswood (film), working title for an Australian thriller, starring Stephen Moyer, Travis Fimmel, and Teresa Palmer, released as Restraint (2008)
- Ravenswood (TV series), a spin-off of Pretty Little Liars
- Ravenswood: The Steelworkers' Victory and the Revival of American Labor, a book by Kate Bronfenbrenner and Tom Juravich
- Ravenswood Castle, a fictional setting in the Scottish Lowlands, featured in Sir Walter Scott's 1819 classic, The Bride of Lammermoor

== Places ==
=== Australia ===
- Ravenswood, Queensland, a town
  - Ravenswood Mining Landscape and Chinese Settlement Area, a heritage-listed area within the town
- Ravenswood, Tasmania, suburb of Launceston, Tasmania
- Ravenswood, Victoria, a locality near Bendigo
- Ravenswood, Western Australia, a town
- Ravenswood (house), a heritage-listed house in Melbourne, Victoria

=== New Zealand ===
- Ravenswood, New Zealand, a development in Canterbury.
- Ravenswood Road, a road in St Clair, a suburb of Dunedin, New Zealand

=== United Kingdom ===
- Ravenswood, Cumbernauld, the largest town in North Lanarkshire, Scotland
- Ravenswood, Ipswich, a district within the town of Ipswich, Suffolk, England
- Ravenswood, Berkshire (alias Bigshot), an estate in Wokingham Without, Berkshire, England

=== United States ===
(by state)

- Ravenswood (Livermore, California), listed on the NRHP in California
- The Ravenswood, Hollywood, California, a 1930s landmark apartment building, longtime home of Mae West
- Ravenswood Winery in Sonoma County, California
- The former Ravenswood High School (East Palo Alto), operated 1958-1976
- Ravenswood, Chicago
  - Ravenswood Line, former name of the Brown Line of the Chicago "L" system
  - Ravenswood station, a Chicago Metra railroad station
- Ravenswood (Indianapolis), Indiana, a neighborhood along the White River
- Ravenswood Place, 19th century plantation in Concordia Parish, Louisiana; belonged to the parents of the Duchess of Manchester
- Ravenswood, Louisiana, an unincorporated community in Pointe Coupee Parish, Louisiana
- Ravenswood (Bunceton, Missouri), listed on the NRHP in Missouri
- Ravenswood, Queens, in Queens, New York
- Ravenswood (Brentwood, Tennessee), listed on the NRHP in Tennessee
- Ravenswood, West Virginia
- Ravenswood Generating Station, including "Big Allis", in Queens, New York
  - Ravenswood Nuclear Power Plant an unbuilt proposal for a nuclear power plant at Ravenswood

== Schools ==
- Ravenswood School (disambiguation), several schools

== Prizes ==
- Ravenswood Australian Women's Art Prize, a group of art prizes

== See also ==
- Ravenwood (disambiguation)
- Ravenswood Historic District (disambiguation)
