= St Maurice's High School =

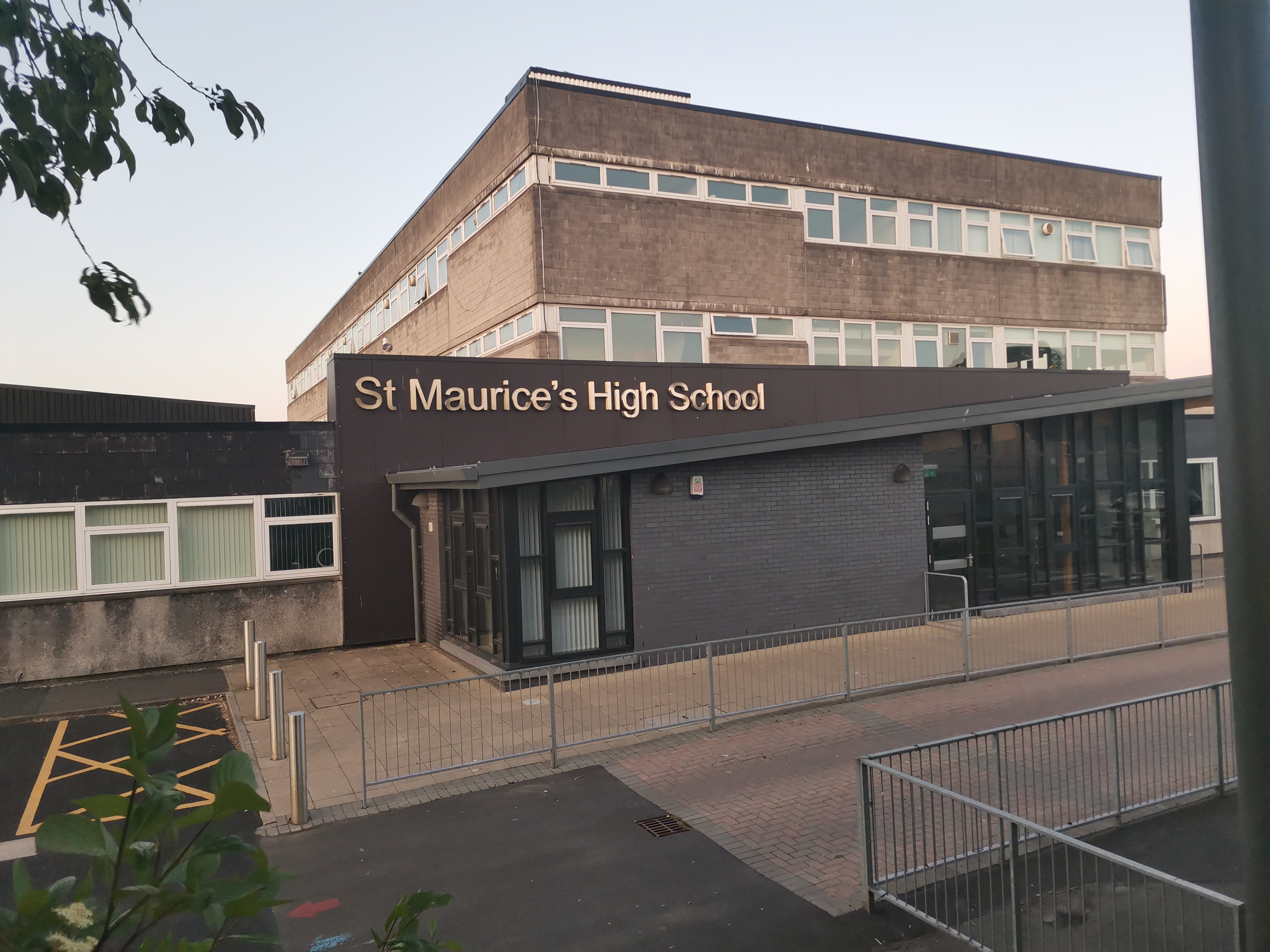

Location
- North Road; Cumbernauld, North Lanarkshire, G68 9AG; Scotland; 55°56′31″N 4°01′55″W

Information
- Type: Secondary school
- Motto: Ad Deum (Latin: 'To god')
- Established: 1975
- Status: Open
- Local authority: North Lanarkshire
- Head Teacher: Laura Moreland
- Gender: Coeducational
- Age: 11 to 18
- Enrolment: 915
- Houses: A; B; C; D; E; F
- Colours: Green, Purple, Black, Blue
- Website: https://blogs.glowscotland.org.uk/nl/stmauriceswebsite/

St Maurice's High School is a Roman Catholic High School in the new town of Cumbernauld, Scotland. The catchment area serves the west side of Cumbernauld, Condorrat, Eastfield, Croy, Kilsyth and Moodiesburn. They also have young people from Glasgow, Chryston, Muirhead, Balloch, Abronhill, Carrickstone and Westerwood where parents have chosen to send their children to St Maurice's rather than other schools.

St. Maurice's has four associated primary schools: Holy Cross Primary, St. Helen's Primary, St. Patrick's Primary and St. Michael's Primary.

The students are grouped into five houses for assemblies, registration classes, school award ceremonies and sports days. These are named Benedict, John Paul, Boniface Km7, Innocent and Francis after previous popes.

== History ==
The name of St Maurice was chosen since he is the patron saint of the town of Bron in France, the 'twin-town' of Cumbernauld. The building was opened in 1975 and extended in 1981 to cope with the rising number of pupils. Most of the extension was destroyed in a malicious fire in 2003, but was subsequently refurbished. In 2018–2019, the school went under further refurbishment with the entrance of the school being completely rebuilt to improve the appearance of the front of the school. The school also had a complete overhaul of their fire safety system through the addition of new alarms and fire doors.

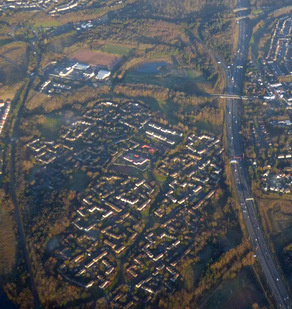
Aerial view of St. Maurice's High School (upper left) and adjacent pond beyond the Westfield neighbourhood

== Notable former pupils ==
- Jon Fratelli (b. 1970) - singer and lead vocalist and guitarist of the Fratellis
- Steve Kean (b. 1967) - footballer Swansea City A.F.C., football manager
- Mark Griffin (b. 1985) - Scottish Labour politician, Member of the Scottish Parliament (MSP) for the Central Scotland (2011 - )
- Darren Barr (b. 1985) - footballer, Falkirk F.C., Heart of Midlothian F.C.
- Jordan Daly (b. 1995) - LGBT rights and anti-bullying campaigner, co-founder of Time for Inclusive Education charity, Young Scot of the Year recipient.
