= Ravenswood School =

Ravenswood School or Ravens Wood School may refer to:

== Australia ==
- Ravenswood School for Girls, in Sydney
- Ravenswood Heights Primary School, in Ravenswood, Tasmania
- Ravenswood School and Residence, a heritage-listed house and school in Ravenswood, Queensland

== United Kingdom ==
- Ravens Wood School in Bromley, England
- Ravenswood School, Nailsea, England
- Ravenswood Primary School, Heaton, Newcastle upon Tyne
- Ravenswood Primary, Ravenswood, Cumbernauld, North Lanarkshire
- Ravenswood Community Primary School, Ipswich, Suffolk
- Ravenswood Prep School, Stoodleigh, Devon, closed in 1991
- Ravenswood School, Derbyshire, 2012–14, a defunct independent school

== United States ==
- Ravenswood High School (East Palo Alto)
- Old Ravenswood School, in Ravenswood, Jackson County, West Virginia
- Ravenswood Grade School, in Ravenswood, Jackson County, West Virginia
- Ravenswood Middle School, in Ravenswood, Jackson County, West Virginia
- Ravenswood High School (West Virginia), in Ravenswood, Jackson County, West Virginia

== See also ==
- Ravenswood City School District, Palo Alto
- Ravenswood (disambiguation)
