= Balloch, Cumbernauld =

Area of Cumbernauld, North Lanarkshire, Scotland

Coordinates: 55°57′0″N 4°1′22″W

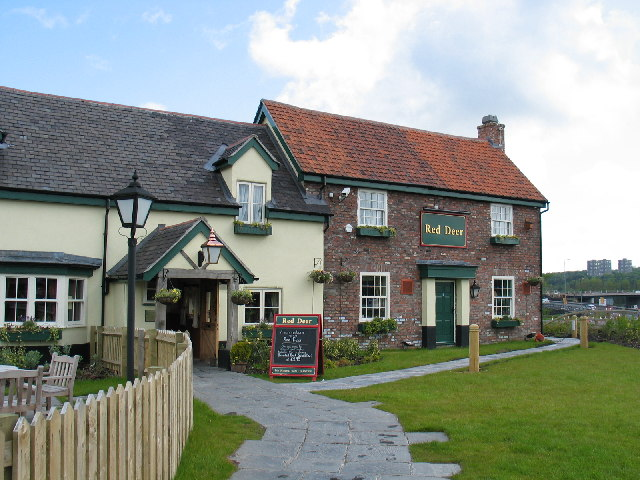
Red Deer Innkeepers Lodge with former Seafar flats in the background

Balloch (/ˈbɑːləx/, Scottish Gaelic: Bealach) is an area of Cumbernauld, Scotland, located north of the M80 motorway and west of Cumbernauld Town Centre. Nearby neighbourhoods include Smithstone, Westfield and Craigmarloch.

== History ==
Balloch's name comes from a farm on the Cumbernauld Estate of the Fleming family. It is a derivative of Scottish Gaelic bealach, meaning a pass among hills or mountains. The area it now occupies used to be covered by Balloch Farm on the west side (located at the site of the Forge Community Centre at Ben Lawers Drive) and Eastfield Holdings on the east side (some of the buildings of which still exist). Balloch is a mainly residential area of privately owned homes, although a number of council-owned houses were built when the area was first established in the 1970s, which are also now largely privately owned – this neighbourhood is commonly referred to locally as Eastfield while the private housing, containing a large number of detached bungalows and villas, is known as Balloch, even though the former council estate is near the old farm and the private housing is closer to Eastfield Cemetery.

Balloch was developed to accommodate growing numbers of people who wished to reside in a commuter town such as Cumbernauld with easy access to Glasgow – in addition to the motorway, Croy railway station is around 1 mile (1.6 km) to the north.

The National Cycle Route 75, which runs between Edinburgh and Glasgow, passes by Balloch.

== Sport ==
=== Football ===
Balloch shares a youth football team with Eastfield called Balloch Eastfield, which runs teams at most age groups. Balloch Eastfield F.C. also run various fundraisers through the year, which allows them to make charitable contributions on a regular basis. Balloch Eastfield FC was founded in 1986, and is in a strong position to continue for a good number of years.

The local amateur team Eastfield AFC was founded in 2002; they reached the final of the Scottish Amateur Cup in 2019. Players have included the former captain of Botswana and the brothers Tyler and Dale Fulton, whose father Steve is involved in coaching the squad.

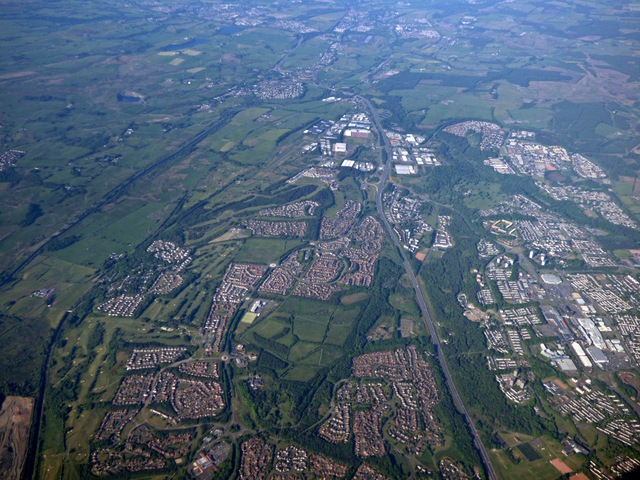
The bottom of the image shows Balloch from the air between Eastfield Road and the M80. The Forth and Clyde canal is to the left with the Edinburgh and Glasgow Railway between it and Cumbernauld Town Centre to the right. Further north is Carrickstone, beyond which the M80 divides Wardpark in two.
