= Carrickstone =

Area of Cumbernauld, Scotland

Coordinates: 55°57′47″N 3°59′37″W

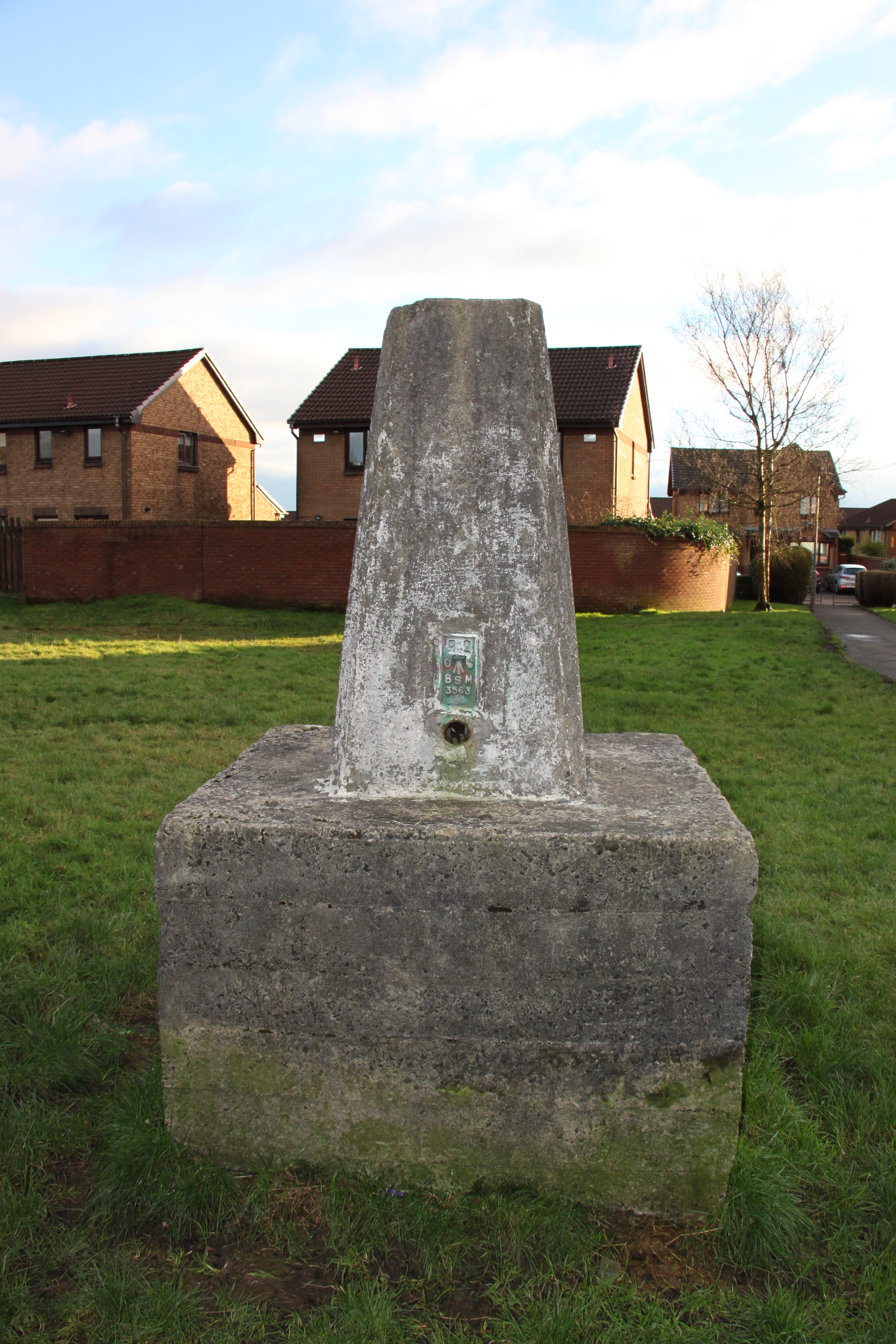
View of the trig point at Carrickstone

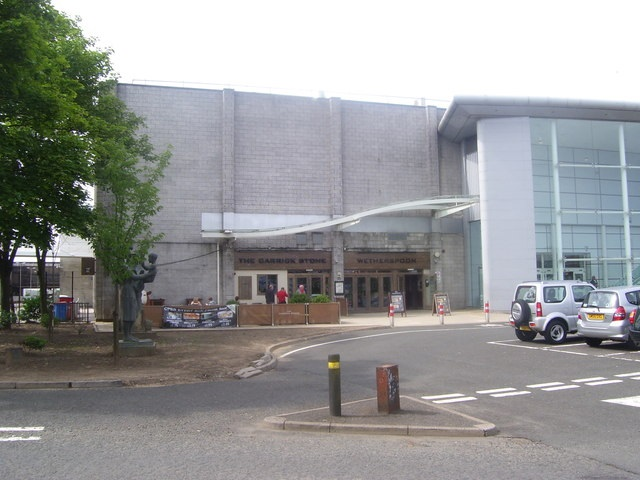
The Carrick Stone - Cumbernauld Town Centre

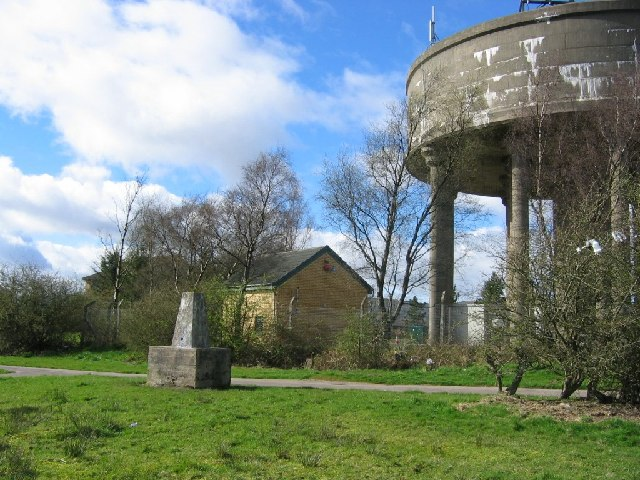
Carrickstone water tower

Carrickstone is an area of Cumbernauld, Scotland. It is on the north of the M80 and west of Cumbernauld Town Centre. The area it now occupies used to be covered by Carrickstone farm with the 25 inch Ordnance Survey map showing it between an ancient "standing stone" and The Village.

== Toponymy ==
"Carrick" is likely a corruption of the Celtic word for a stone, making the name a tautology. The historical origin of Carrickstone's name is uncertain although it is now undoubtedly tied to the Roman altar.

== History ==
Carrickstone is named after the only Roman altar still in the open air in Scotland. John Watson in the New Statistical Account of Scotland described the stone long before the modern settlement took shape. The stone has also been linked with Robert Bruce, being the place where he reportedly set up his standard on his way to Bannockburn. There is some evidence that coffins were laid on top of the stone on their way to the cemetery in Kirkintilloch and that the stone has been somewhat worn away. Several old documents show Carrickstone including maps by Charles Ross, and William Roy.

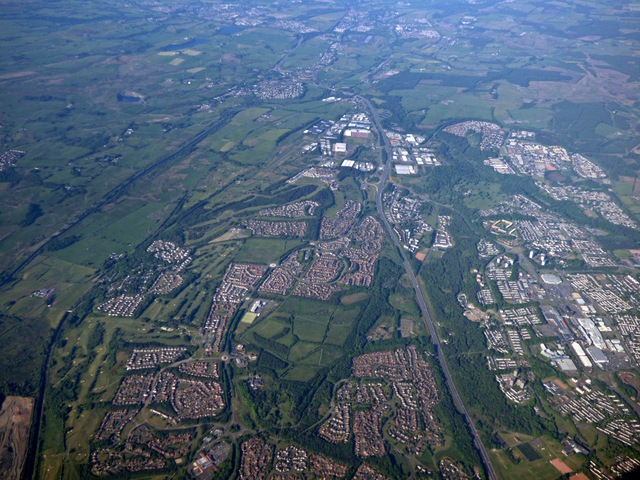
The bottom of the picture shows Balloch from the air between Eastfield Road and the M80. The Forth and Clyde canal is to the left with the railway between it and Cumbernauld Town Centre to the right. Further north is Carrickstone beyond which the M80 divides Wardpark in two.
