= Cumbernauld Village =

Area of Cumbernauld, Scotland

Coordinates: 55.96294°N 3.98684°W

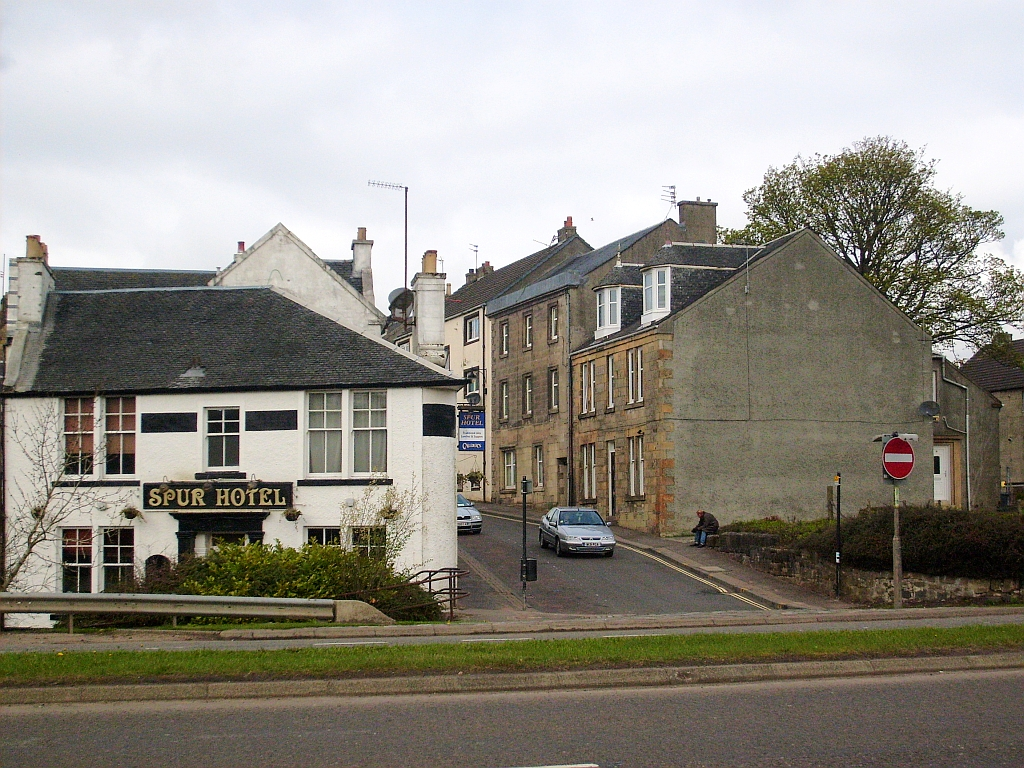
The Spur Hotel, Cumbernauld Village

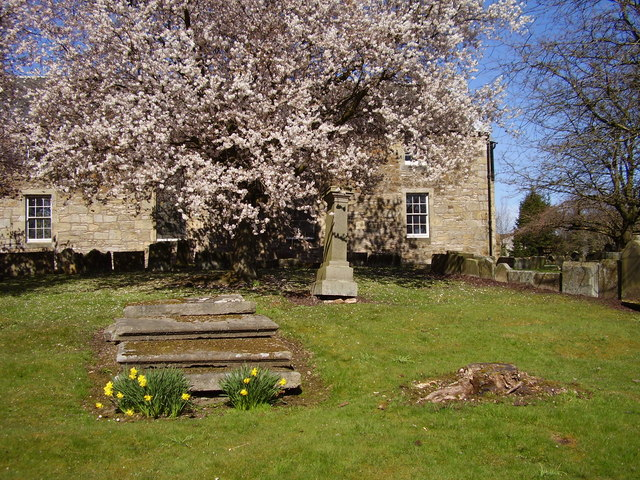
Churchyard, Cumbernauld Old Parish Church

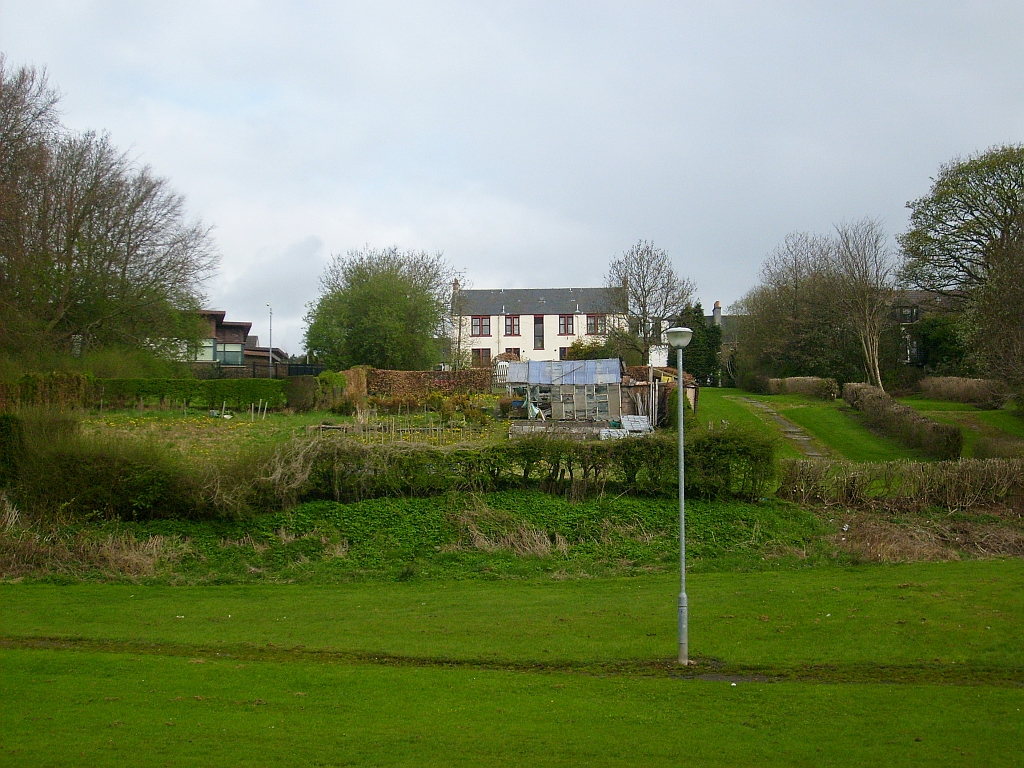
The Lang Riggs

Cumbernauld Village (often referred to locally as just the Village) is an area of Cumbernauld. Whilst Cumbernauld was designated a new town in 1955, the Village itself has a pre-mediaeval history, with a Roman settlement being built in the area due to its proximity to the Antonine Wall. After the Roman period the settlement remained and grew to such an extent that the Comyn family built their chapel there. It is recorded that, in 1500, the Black Death led to a special plea from the surviving people of Cumbernauld to the church authorities in Glasgow to allow them to establish their own cemetery rather than taking all their dead to St. Ninian's in Kirkintilloch. This source is also quoted in "Excavations at 3-11 Main Street, Cumbernauld". The villagers were granted permission to do so, and used the ground at the existing Comyns' chapel which dates from the end of the 12th century. Farming in long strips or Lang Riggs was carried out in the village.

The Flemings (who would become the Earls of Wigtown) later took over the Comyns' castle in Cumbernauld. In the 18th century this was replaced by Cumbernauld House

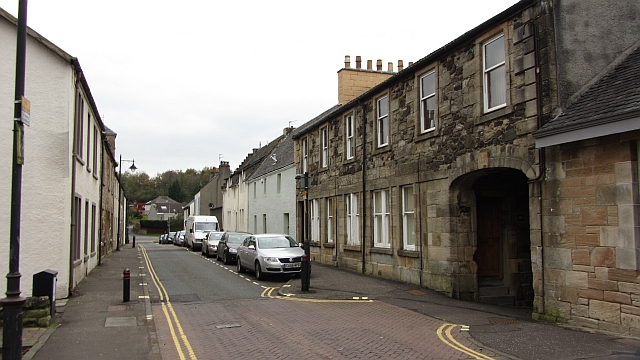
The Wynd with a pend rather than an early underpass and pavements beside the road

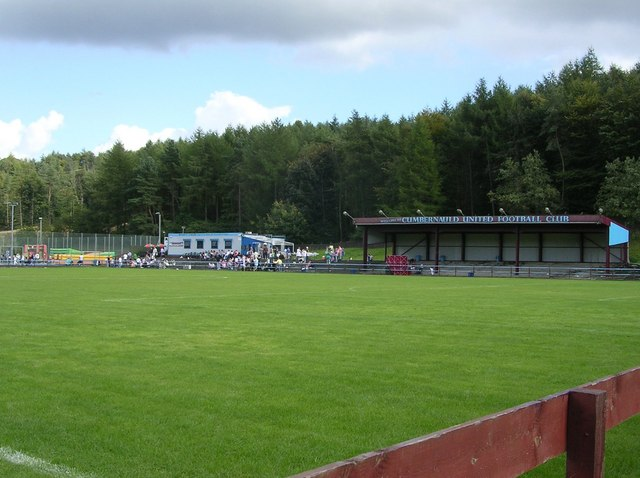
Guy's Meadow

By the 17th century the main industry of the Village was hand loom weaving, but this subsequently changed as due to the village's proximity to the Forth and Clyde canal and rich source of natural minerals and stone it became a site of mining and quarrying. The Village was also the site of a number of tenant held farms on the Flemings' estate. The 19th century Groome's Gazetteer states that Cumbernauld is: "A picturesque old place, sheltered to E and SE by the grounds of Cumbernauld House, it was created a burgh of barony in 1649, and has a post office under Glasgow, a branch of the Royal Bank, a local savings' bank, 2 chief inns, gas-works, many new handsome villas, and a cattle-fair on the second Thursday of May. The parish church here is an old building, containing 660 sittings; the Free church dates from 1826, having belonged to the Original Secession, but has been lately almost rebuilt; and there is also a new U.P. church. Handloom weaving of checks and other striped fabrics is still carried on, but mining and quarrying are the staple industry. Pop. (1861) 1561, (1871) 1193, (1881) 1064."

Cumbernauld had one of the oldest curling societies in the world which was established in the 18th century. The curling pond was near the Spur Inn, on the other side of the Bog Stank to the village.

October 1878 was a difficult time locally made worse by the failure of the Bank of Glasgow in which much of the village's money was invested. As the mining industry declined the village was further boosted by the decision to site a new town in the vicinity, with Cumbernauld lending its name to this new town.

== Today ==
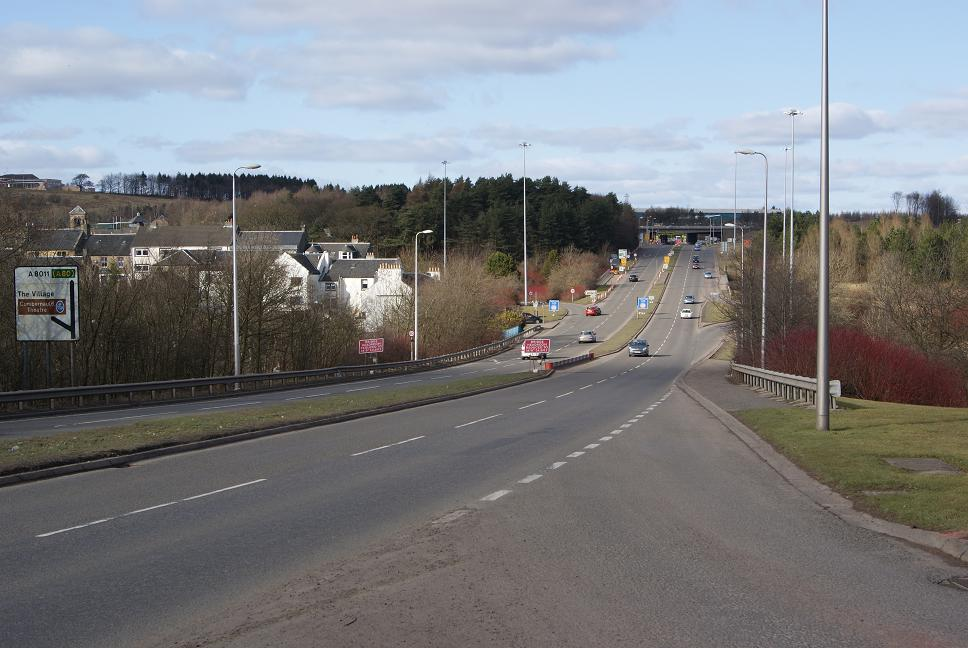
Looking North from Wilderness Brae to entrance to Village near old curling pond

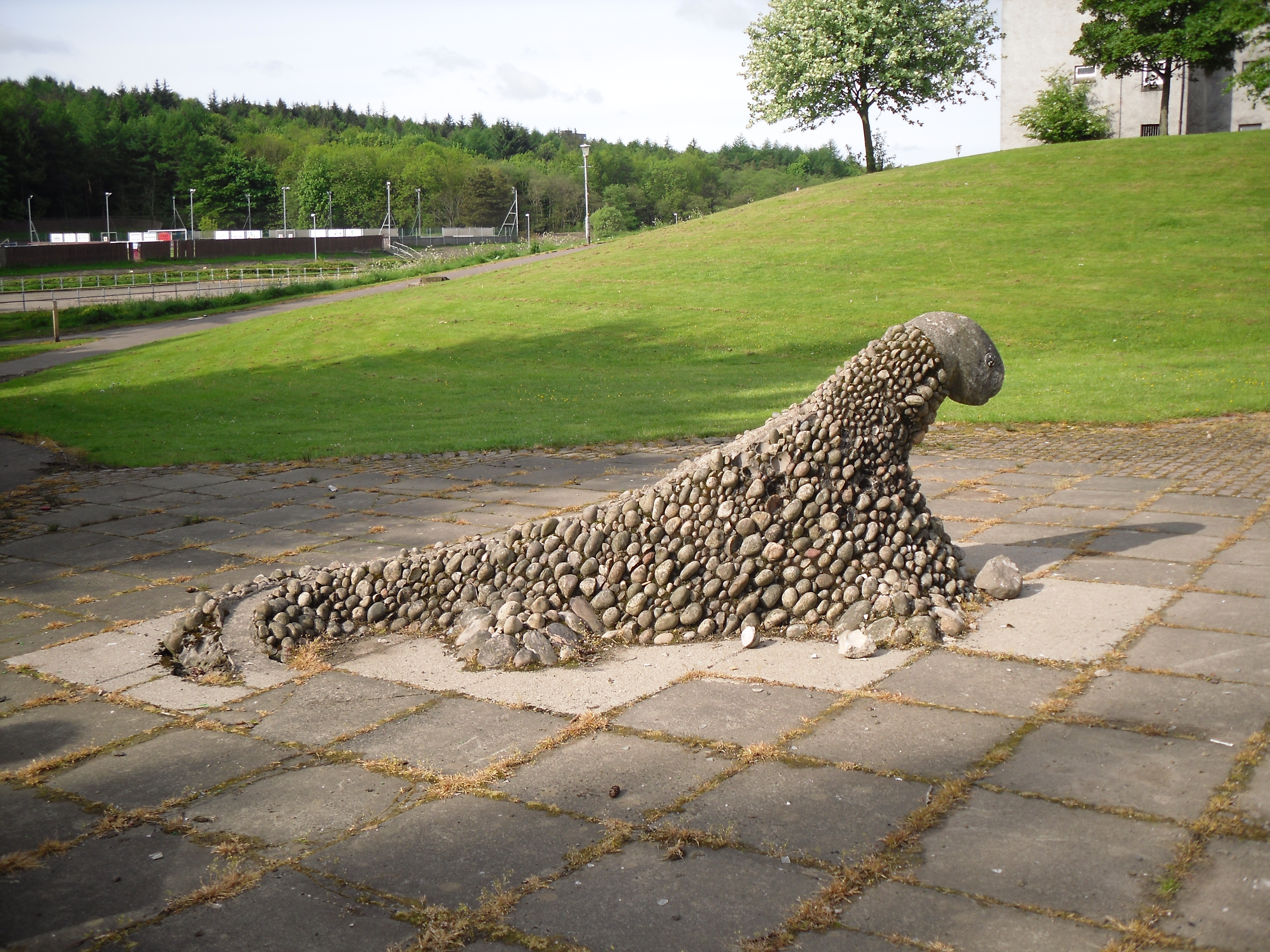
Pebbled Monster

Today, Cumbernauld Village is quite characteristically different from most of the rest of the town, as it contains a high number of local amenities, and its structure of having pavements beside the roads in the Village is quite unlike the rest of the planned new town, with the possible exception of Condorrat which, like Cumbernauld Village, is a settlement of many years' standing before the new town's construction.

Cumbernauld Village has an active local community and local people are involved in the Village Community Council and in Cumbernauld Village Action for the Community. The latter is a community group campaigning for improvements to the amenity of the Village.

== Cumbernauld United FC ==
Cumbernauld's junior (non-league) football team, Cumbernauld United, play in the Village at Guy's Meadow. Cumbernauld United also have a full youth academy with teams at all age groups from under 6 upwards, considered by many as one of the best in Central Scotland. All of United's teams play on the main Guy's Meadow pitch or on the impressive Astroturf facility which surrounds the stadium: Hat-Trix soccer complex.

From season 2014-15 to 2023-34 SJFA West Region Premiership (a division above United) side Kirkintilloch Rob Roy ground-shared at Guy's Meadow having sold their own ground, Adamslie Park, to a housing developer in order to pay off debts. Rob Roy now play their home games at Kirkintilloch Community Sports Campus.

== See also ==
- The Village, East Kilbride
- Livingston Village
