= Cumbernauld United F.C. =

Association football club in Scotland

Cumbernauld United
- Full name: Cumbernauld United Football Club
- Nickname: Cumby
- Founded: 1964
- Ground: Guy's Meadow, Cumbernauld
- Chairman: George Watson
- Manager: Tony Fraser
- League: West of Scotland League Premier Division
- 2025–26: West of Scotland League First Division, 8th of 16 (promoted)
Home colours	Away colours

Cumbernauld United Football Club are a football club based in Cumbernauld, North Lanarkshire, Scotland. They play at Guy's Meadow in the Cumbernauld Village area of the town.

Formed in 1964, they currently compete in the West of Scotland League Premier Division, having previously played in the SJFA West Region before moving to the senior pyramid in 2020.

Club colours are maroon and blue, and the club's nickname is "United".

The club has a full youth academy with teams from the under-6 age group up to under-19 level. The academy plays its home games on the 'HatTrix' astroturf park adjacent to the Guy's Meadow pitch, as well as on that pitch itself when weather permits.

The club also has a successful five-a-side complex and social club.

The team are managed by former Partick Thistle midfielder Andy Frame, who replaced previous manager George Shaw in January 2017.

Guy's Meadow
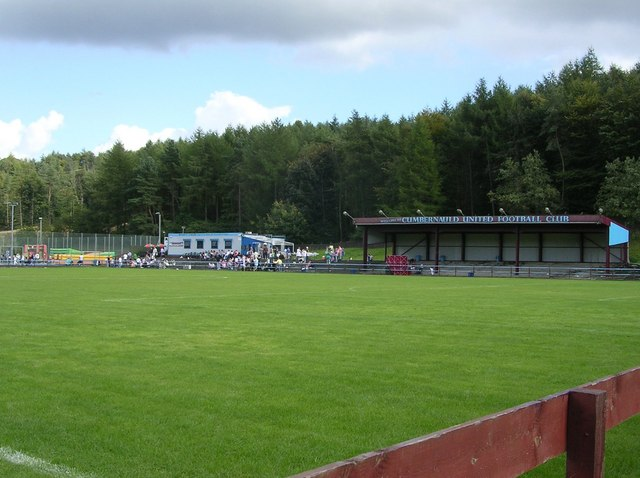
- Interactive map of Guy's Meadow
- Location: Cumbernauld Village, North Lanarkshire, Scotland
- Coordinates: 55.95736°N 3.98443°W
- Owner: Cumbernauld United
- Capacity: 2,500 (standing)
- Surface: Grass

Construction
- Opened: 1964

Tenants
- Cumbernauld United 1964–; Kirkintilloch Rob Roy 2014–2024

== Guy's Meadow ==
Guy's Meadow is the home to Cumbernauld United. The stadium currently has a capacity of 2,500 which consists of mainly standing areas.

=== Facilities ===
The stadium has few facilities, however the Hat-Trix sports bar lies at one end of the park and two terraced stands are situated at either side of the pitch. The facility also includes an impressive astroturf facility, mainly used to host five-a-side football. The stadium's record attendance was set when 2,200 people watched Cumbernauld play Pollok in 1983.

=== Kirkintilloch Rob Roy ===
From 2014 to 2024, fellow West of Scotland League club Kirkintilloch Rob Roy used the stadium as their home venue while they searched for new home to replace the historic Adamslie Park, where they played for almost 100 years.

From the start of the 24/25 season, Kirky vacated Guy's Meadow and moved into the Kirkintilloch Community Sports Complex.

== Notable former players ==
- Kenny Dalglish: The former Celtic, Liverpool and Scotland International played for Cumbernauld United during season 1967–68.
- Lee McCulloch: Motherwell, Wigan, Rangers and Scotland

== Honours ==
- Central Region B Division / Overall champions: 1977–78
- Central Region A Division / Overall runners-up: 1970–71
