= Ravenwood =

Ravenwood may refer to:

- Ravenwood, a neighborhood in Langford, British Columbia
- Ravenwood, Missouri
- Ravenwood High School, a high school in Brentwood, Tennessee
- Ravenwood Plantation, a historic rice plantation in Colleton County, South Carolina
- Ravenwood, a fictional private military company owned by Jennings & Rall in the TV series Jericho
- Ravenwood Fair, a Facebook game
- "Ravenwood, Stepson of Mystery", a short-lived occult detective series by Frederick C. Davis that ran in Secret Agent X pulp magazine.
- Marion Ravenwood, a fictional character in the 1981 film Raiders of the Lost Ark

== See also ==
- Ravenswood (disambiguation)
