= Antonine Centre =

Shopping center in Scotland

Coordinates: 55°56′51″N 3°59′23″W

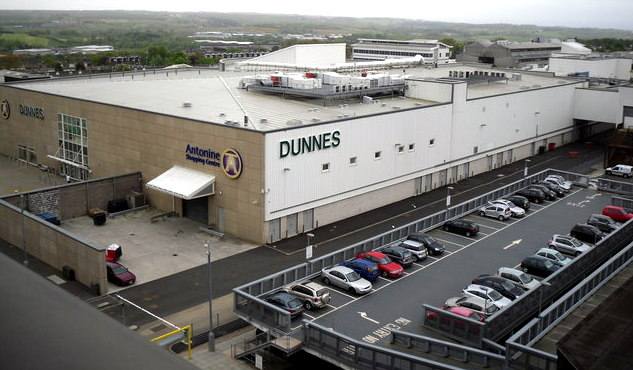
The Antonine Centre

The Antonine Centre is a shopping centre in the Scottish New Town of Cumbernauld. The centre has 350,000 sq ft (33,000 m^{2}) of retail space including a 100,000 sq ft (9,300 m^{2}) Tesco Extra (in a separate building to the main centre, attached by walkways) and a 43,000 sq ft (4,000 m^{2}) Dunnes which closed in 2018. This was replaced by a TJ Hughes in 2019 which was permanently closed in 2024.The centre was expected to open sometime in May 2007, but instead opened on 6 June 2007, following delays caused by planning disputed over the pedestrian walkways connecting the complex to existing buildings.

The name is a reference to the Roman Antonine Wall, which passed through nearby Westerwood.

== Historical background ==
Cumbernauld Town Centre, developed in the 1950s, has been considered one of the ugliest in Britain, twice winning Prospect magazine's Carbuncle Award for the most unpleasant town centre in the country; in 2001 it was described as "The Kabul of the north" while the entire town centre was nominated as Britain's ugliest structure in the Channel 4 programme Demolition. Despite these criticisms, much of the surrounding area contains sought after residential property and is located for ease of access to the major conurbations.

The £40 million Antonine Centre project was launched in 1995 as part of a plan to change the nature of the town centre and public perception of the town. However, some have remarked that the new centre seems to have been designed to complement the architecture and look of the existing structures, which are so disliked by the majority of local residents.

== Construction ==
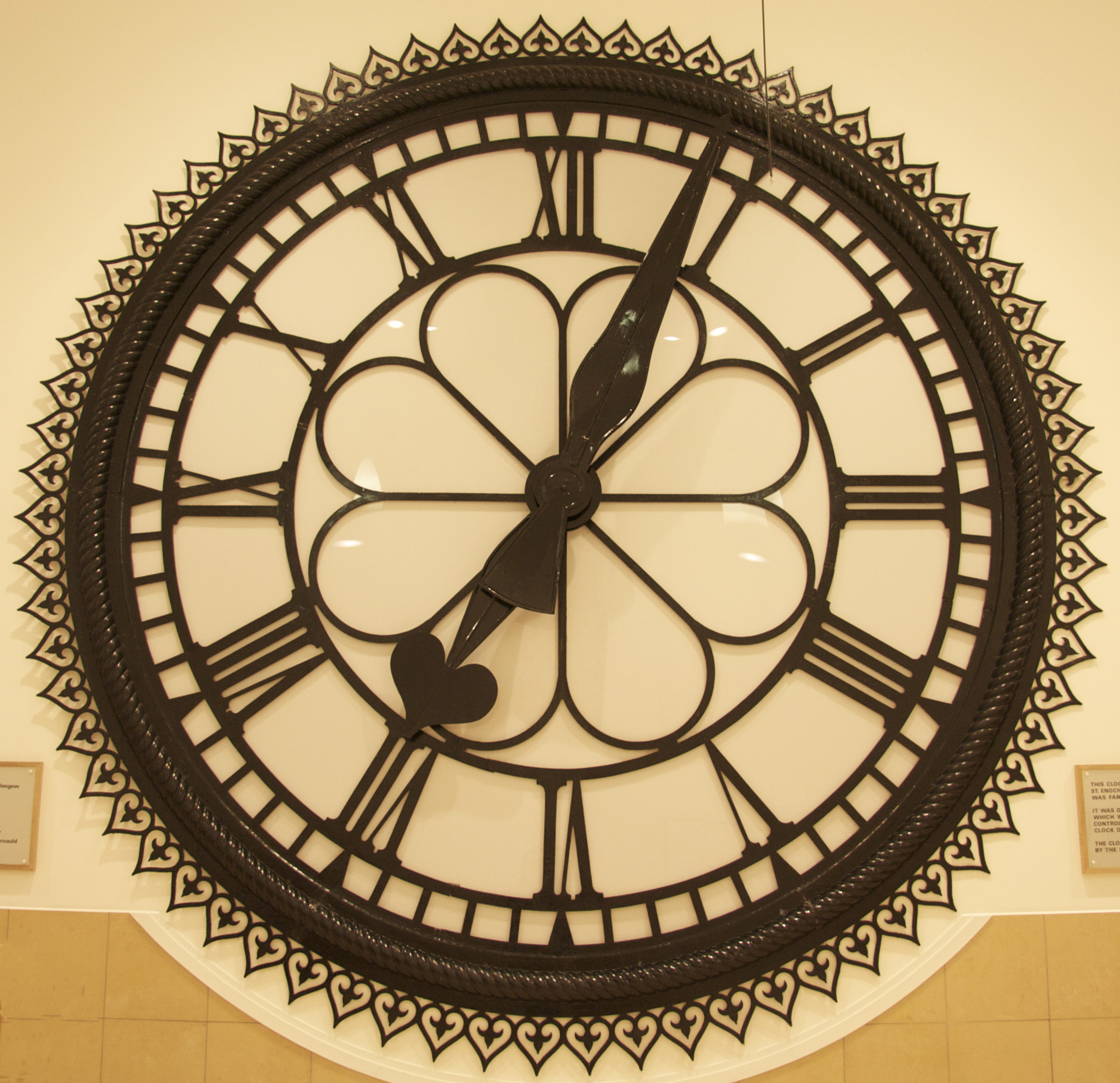
St Enoch's station clock

After over ten years of delays, construction began in April 2006. North Lanarkshire council Deputy Leader Jim Smith stated that the aims of the centre were to "Bring new jobs, new opportunities, new investment and new life into Cumbernauld (and) help make sure local money stays local by encouraging people to stay in the town instead of heading for Edinburgh, Stirling or Glasgow".

The building incorporates the historic clock from St Enoch railway station in Glasgow, made famous in the 1981 film Gregory's Girl.

The former Tesco (connected to the new development by a network of walkways) was also subdivided into smaller retail units.

== Shops and projected effects on the local area ==
As well as the Tesco Extra, the centre has 42 other retail outlets including River Island and Next. It is projected that the centre will increase expenditure in the town by 84%, while total retail spending in the town is projected to rise by 166%, transforming the local economy.

The centre contains four "civic spaces" for community use, and a commemorative artwork commissioned to mark the 50th anniversary of the town of Cumbernauld.
