= Seafar =

Area of Cumbernauld, Scotland

Coordinates: 55.950°N 3.993°W

- Location within North Lanarkshire
- OS grid reference: NS756748
- Council area: North Lanarkshire
- Lieutenancy area: Dunbartonshire
- Country: Scotland
- Sovereign state: United Kingdom
- Post town: GLASGOW
- Postcode district: G67
- Dialling code: 01236
- Police: Scotland
- Fire: Scottish
- Ambulance: Scottish
- UK Parliament: Cumbernauld, Kilsyth and Kirkintilloch East
- Scottish Parliament: Cumbernauld and Kilsyth

Seafar is an area of the town of Cumbernauld. The original Seafar sand pit and farm were in the middle of what is now the A8011. Early in the new town's history Seafar was more distinct from Ravenswood and Muirhead than it now is possibly due to the building schedule and signage on paths. Recently Seafar is more dominant, perhaps because neither Ravenswood nor Muirhead appear on road signs.

Seafar is south of the M80 motorway and is bordered by Seafar wood, planted at the time of the construction of the town. The area was the second built in the new town of Cumbernauld, its many streets are named after famous Scottish artists and writers. St Mary's is its local Roman Catholic primary school. Seafar Primary School was demolished and replaced by sheltered housing in 2004. There is a Kingdom Hall of Jehovah's Witnesses next to St Mary's Primary school. The demolition of multistorey flats gave rise to a new housing development by Sanctuary Homes. Over a hundred new houses in Berryhill Road and Hume Road are due for completion in March 2018.

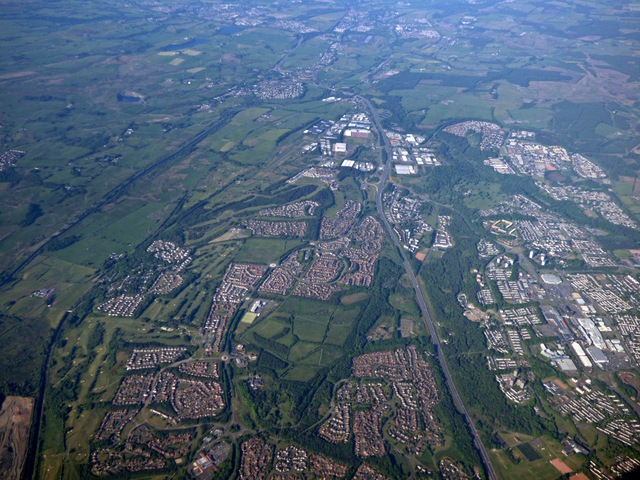
Seafar lies between the Town Centre and the M80, adjacent to Ravenswood.
