= Adamslie Park =

Stadium in Kirkintilloch, Scotland

Coordinates: 55°56′14.59″N 4°10′16.59″W

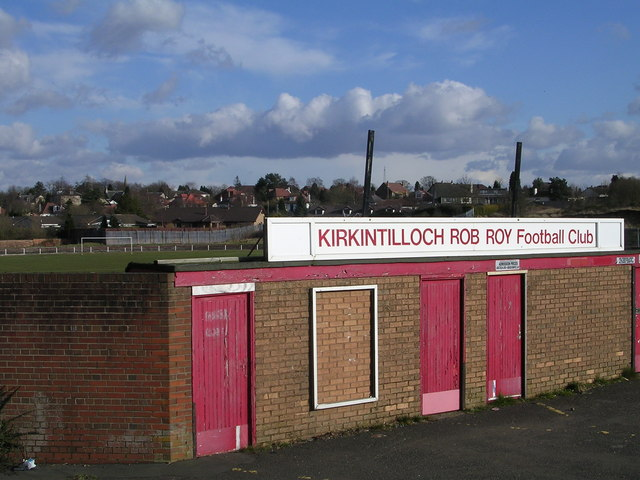
- Exterior of Adamslie Park

- Location within East Dunbartonshire
- Location: Glasgow Road, Kirkintilloch, East Dunbartonshire, Scotland
- Capacity: 5,550 (standing)

Construction
- Opened: 7 August 1926
- Closed: 2014

Tenants
- Kirkintilloch Harp F.C. Kirkintilloch Rob Roy F.C. (1926–2014)

Adamslie Park was formerly a football ground in Kirkintilloch, East Dunbartonshire, Scotland, which was the home ground of Scottish Junior Football Association club Kirkintilloch Rob Roy F.C. until 2014. It was located on Glasgow Road in the north-west of the town and had a capacity of 5,500 all standing. Whilst the facility was primarily used for football matches, it had been the venue for Highland Games, and annual Lairdsland Primary School Sports Days, in the past.

== History ==
Adamslie Park was previously the home of another junior football club from the town, Kirkintilloch Harp, in the early 1900s. The ground's current tenants, Kirkintilloch Rob Roy have played their home games at Adamslie Park since 1926. It was officially opened by Provost John Shanks on 7 August of that year. The club played their home games at other grounds prior to Adamslie Park. In the 1878–79 season the club played at Smillies Pond, also known as Coxdale Park, before moving to a site in the Broadfield area until 1889. The club's last move before Adamslie Park was to Kelvinside Park, which hosted its home matches until 1926. Kirkintilloch Rob Roy's first match at the ground was versus Petershill which resulted in a loss for the home side. On 10 August 2014, Adamslie Park played host to its first competitive SWFL Second Division match with Kirkintilloch Rob Roy Ladies losing 3–0 to Dunfermline 2013.

== Transport ==
The nearest railway station to the ground is Lenzie railway station, which is within a 40-minute walk of Adamslie Park. The station is located on the Croy Line between Glasgow Queen Street and Dunblane. Alternate trains terminate at Alloa.

Regular bus services provided by First provide access to Kirkintilloch. Route numbers 24, 27, 89, 175 and 184 from Buchanan bus station in Glasgow stop outside Adamslie Park.

== Closure and new stadium ==
After several years of unsuccessful attempts to sell the ground to keep Kirkintilloch Rob Roy financially viable (the club's social club having closed with debts of around £30,000), it was announced in April 2014 that the last match to be played at Adamslie Park would be a friendly against Rangers on Sunday 18 May, the ground having been sold to a house builder for £3 million. The last competitive men's match to be played at Adamslie Park was a cup match on Wednesday 23 April 2014 against Renfrew. The match ended in a 3–2 victory for Rob Roy. The last competitive women's match was on Sunday 31 August 2014 against Riverside Ladies. The match ended with Rob Roy Ladies winning 3–0.

The club also announced that, during the 2014–15 season, they would ground-share with Cumbernauld United at their Guy's Meadow stadium before moving to a new stadium in the Southbank area of Kirkintilloch. The new stadium will have capacity for 490 spectators and have one of the few artificial playing surfaces in Scottish Junior football.
