= Cumbernauld =

Town in North Lanarkshire, Scotland

Coordinates: 55.945°N 3.994°W

Cumbernauld: Scottish Gaelic: Comar nan Allt
- Town
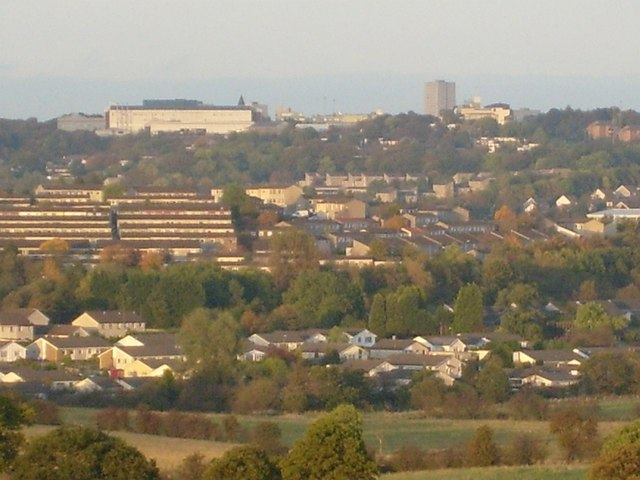
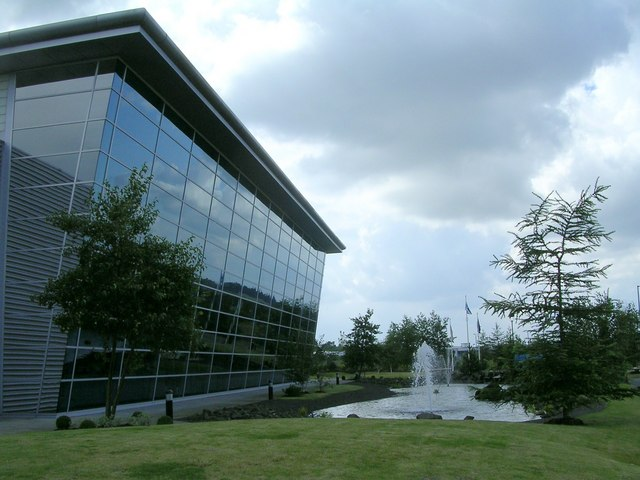
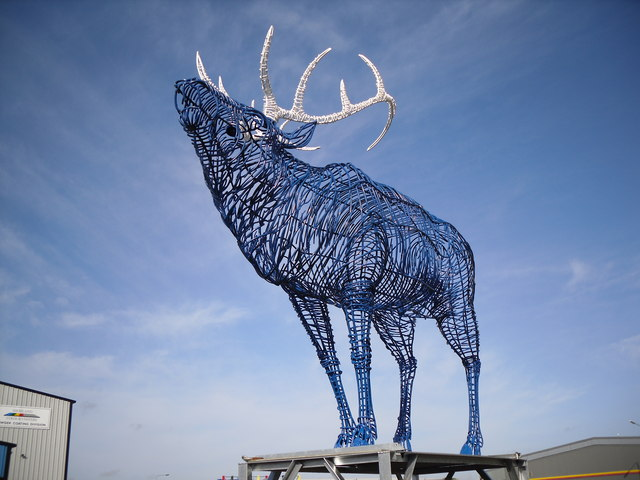
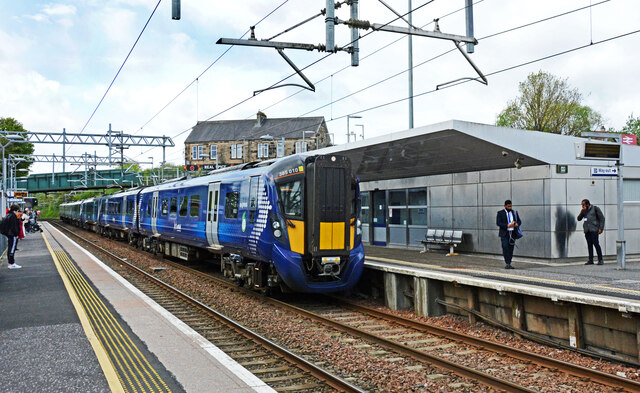
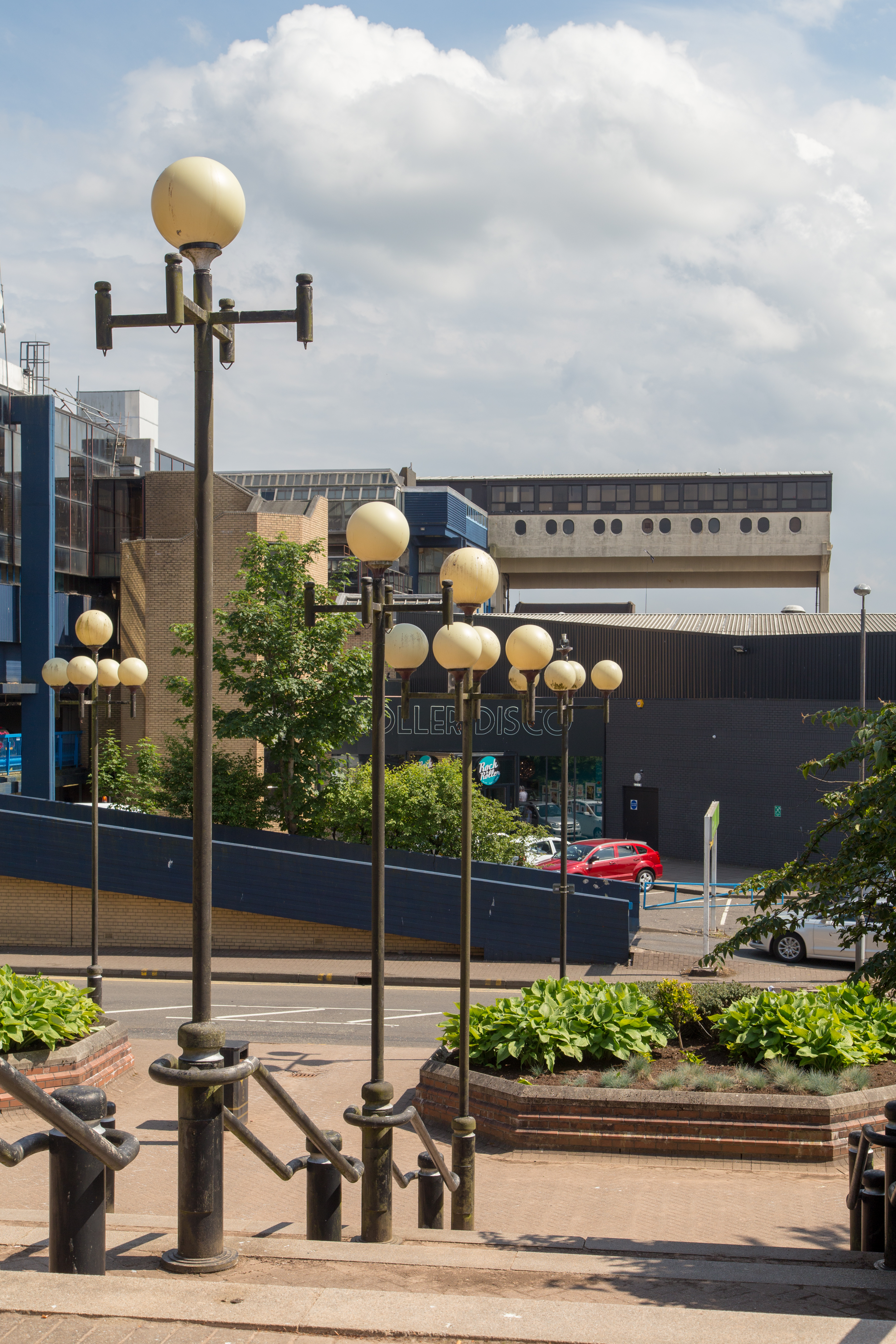
- Skyline of Cumbernauld Morgan Stanley offices Stag Sculpture Cumbernauld railway station Cumbernauld Centre

- Location within North Lanarkshire
- Area: 21.5 km^{2} (8.3 sq mi)
- Population: 50,498 (2022)
  - Density: 2,349/km^{2} (6,080/sq mi)
- OS grid reference: NS763736
  - Edinburgh: 31 mi (50 km)
  - London: 345 mi (555 km)
- Council area: North Lanarkshire
- Lieutenancy area: Dunbartonshire
- Country: Scotland
- Sovereign state: United Kingdom
- Post town: GLASGOW
- Postcode district: G67, G68
- Dialling code: 01236
- Police: Scotland
- Fire: Scottish
- Ambulance: Scottish
- UK Parliament: Cumbernauld and Kirkintilloch
- Scottish Parliament: Cumbernauld and Kilsyth

Cumbernauld (/ˌkʌmbərˈnɔːld/; Scottish Gaelic: Comar nan Allt, lit. 'meeting of the streams') is a town in North Lanarkshire, Scotland. It lies within the historic county of Dunbartonshire. It is the tenth most-populous locality in Scotland and the most populated town in North Lanarkshire, positioned in the centre of Scotland's Central Belt. Geographically, Cumbernauld sits between east and west, being on the Scottish watershed between the Forth and the Clyde; however, it is culturally more weighted towards Glasgow and the New Town's planners aimed to fill 80% of its houses from Scotland's largest city to reduce housing pressure there.

For a period of time, Cumbernauld was chiefly populated around what is now called The Village with the medieval castle a short walk away surrounded by its own park grounds. The castle frequently hosted visiting royalty and the grounds were famous for their white cattle which were hunted in the oak forest. The town began to enlarge as the weaving industry of the village was supplemented by mining and quarrying as travel across Scotland became easier due to the Forth and Clyde Canal and the railways being constructed. Cumbernauld railway station, though some distance from the village, improved communications with Glasgow, Falkirk and Stirling.

Cumbernauld was designated as the site for a New Town on 9 December 1955. This led to rapid expansion and building for about 40 years until the town became established as the largest in North Lanarkshire. In 2022, the population of Cumbernauld was 50,498 inhabitants, housed in more than a dozen residential areas. Cumbernauld's economy is a mixture of some manufacturing, mainly on its industrial estates, as well as service industries in the town centre and in sites close to the M80. It was featured in Our World, the first live multinational multi-satellite television production.

== Etymology ==
Cumbernauld's name probably comes from the Gaelic comar nan allt, meaning "meeting of the burns or streams". There are differing views as to the etymology of this. One theory is that from its high point in the Central Belt, its streams flow both west to the River Clyde and east to the Firth of Forth so Cumbernauld's name is about it being on a watershed. Another theory ascribes the name to the meeting point of the Red Burn and Bog Stank streams within Cumbernauld Glen. 'Cumbernauld' is generally considered to be a Gaelic name. However, early forms containing Cumyr- hint at a Cumbric predecessor derived from *cömber, 'confluence' (cf. Welsh cymer, 'confluence'), synonymous with Aber. This seems to be suffixed with Cumbric *-ïn-alt, a topographical suffix perhaps referring to a hill or slope (Welsh yn allt, 'at a hill').

== History ==
=== Early history ===
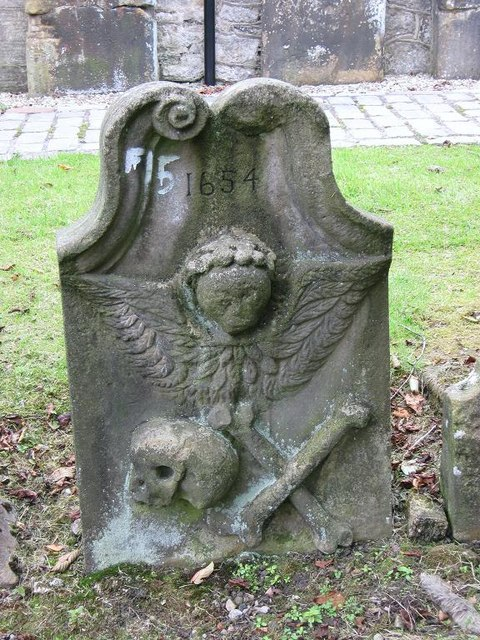
Skull & Crossbones Headstone in Old Parish cemetery from 1654. The oldest local engraving is from 1625.

Cumbernauld's history stretches at least to Roman times, as Westerwood was a Roman fort on the Antonine Wall, the furthest and most northerly boundary of the Roman Empire. Two Roman temporary camps have been discovered and digitally reconstructed east of the fort, at Tollpark (now covered by Wardpark North) and at Garnhall, similar to the two at Dullatur. One of the most discussed Roman finds from Cumbernauld is a sandstone slab depicting Triton and a naked, kneeling captive. It was found on a farm at Arniebog (between the runway of Cumbernauld Airport and Westerwood Golf Course). The slab can now be viewed at the Hunterian Museum in Glasgow along with an uninscribed altar from Arniebog and other artefacts like the inscribed altar, and statuette found at Castlecary and an older copy of the Bridgeness Slab. In addition to these, an altarstone to Silvanus and the Sky dedicated by a centurion named Verecundus and his wife has been found. Cumbernauld also has the only Roman altar still in the open air in Scotland: the Carrick Stone. The stone has also been linked with Robert Bruce, being the place where he reportedly set up his standard on his way to Bannockburn. There is some evidence that coffins were laid on top of the stone on their way to the cemetery in Kirkintilloch and that the stone has been somewhat worn away.

There is a record of the charter of the lands of Lenzie and Cumbernauld, granted to William Comyn by Alexander II in 1216. Cumbernauld Castle was first built as a Norman-style motte and bailey castle. Owned by the Comyns, it was situated at the east end of the park, where the motte (mound) is still visible. The Flemings took possession of Cumbernauld Castle and its estate (c.1306) after Robert the Bruce murdered the Red Comyn. Robert Fleming was a staunch supporter of Bruce, and one of his companions that day. To provide proof that Comyn was dead, Fleming cut off his head in order to "let the deed shaw", a Fleming family motto ever since. On 1 October 1310 Robert the Bruce wrote to Edward II of England from Kildrum trying, unsuccessfully, to establish peace between Scotland and England. Abercromby describes Malcolm Fleming as returning home to Inverbervie with the formerly exiled 21-year-old King David II. Around 1371, the family built a second castle where the Cumbernauld House now stands. One castle wall exists but most of the stonework was recycled for the House or other buildings. King Robert III knighted Malcolm and granted Sir Malcolm Fleming and his heirs the charter to Cumbernauld Castle on 2 April 1406, just two days before the king's death. Malcolm (and his heir in 1427) were used as hostages to ransom James I back from the English. He also seems to have been arrested by James and imprisoned briefly in Dalkeith Castle. In 1440, this Malcolm Fleming attended the Black Dinner along with his 16-year-old friend Earl William Douglas and his 11-year-old brother David Douglas at Edinburgh Castle. Immediately after the dinner, at which a black bull's head was served, there was a trial on trumped-up charges and the brothers were beheaded in front of the 10-year-old King James II. Malcolm shared their fate three days later. Malcolm was succeeded by his son Robert.

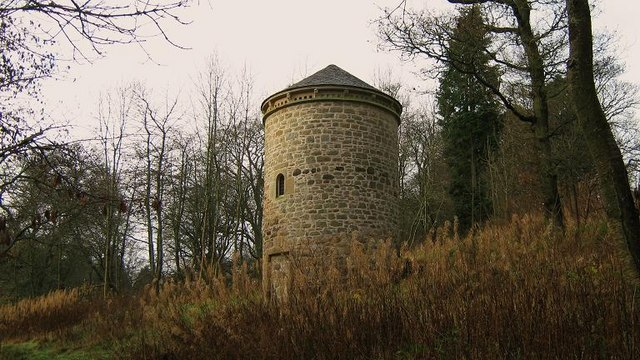
A dovecote from the 1600s was attached to the gamekeeper's cottage

The castle played host to the royalty of Scotland. James IV (1473–1513) wooed Margaret Drummond at Cumbernauld Castle, where Margaret's sister was married to Lord Fleming. The Drummond sisters lie buried in Dunblane Cathedral following their poisoning, possibly by a government determined to marry an unwilling King James to the sister of Henry VIII of England, Margaret Tudor. The murders made James IV a frequent visitor to Cumbernauld, Margaret Tudor accompanying him on one occasion. It is recorded that during this James' reign in 1500, the Black Death led to a special plea from the surviving people of Cumbernauld to the church authorities in Glasgow to allow them to establish their own cemetery rather than taking all their dead to St. Ninian's in Kirkintilloch. They were granted permission to do so, and used the ground at the existing Comyns' chapel which dates from the end of the 12th century.

=== Post-Reformation history ===
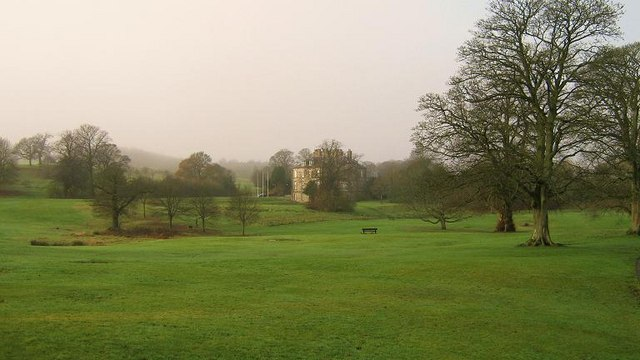
Cumbernauld House and Grounds

James V is recorded as staying for a couple of days at the castle around 14 December 1529. In November 1542, Malcolm Fleming, Lord Chamberlain of Scotland to King James V, was taken prisoner by the English at the Battle of Solway Moss, but released at a ransom of 1,000 marks, paid on 1 July 1548. Mary, Queen of Scots visited the castle and reportedly planted a sweet chestnut tree in the grounds in 1561; she's also said to have planted a yew tree at Castlecary Castle, only a mile or two away, which still grows there. The whole great hall collapsed while the queen was staying at Commernalde on 26 January 1562, and 7 or 8 men were killed. Most of the queen's party were out hunting. Mary was not hurt and visited the relatives of those who were injured or killed in the village below. Royalty often visited the town to hunt the rare Scottish ox, or white cattle, which roamed in the woods around Cumbernauld. These woods were a surviving fragment of the ancient Caledonian Forest, in which the oxen abounded at least till 1571 and probably until the building of the new house. Many of these were deliberately killed by Regent Lennox's men and a plaintiff complains: "And amonges others greite enormyties perpetrated be th' erles men of werre they have slayne and destroyed the dere in John Fleming's forest of Cummernald and the quhit ky and bullis, to the gryt destructione of polecie and hinder of the commonweil. For that kynd of ky and bullis hes bein keipit this money yeiris in the said forest; and the like was not mentenit in ony uther partis of the Ile of Albion as is well knowen." "(In English, And amongst others, great enormities perpetrated by the Earl's soldiers, they have slain and destroyed the deer in John Fleming's forest of Cumbernauld and the white cows and bulls, to the great destruction of the park of the estate and hindering of the common good. For those kind of cows and bulls have been kept these many years in the said forest; and their like was not maintained in any other parts of the British Isles as is well known.")

John Livingstone stayed often at Cumbernauld between 1632–1634. He was staying there during the Shotts Revival on Monday 21 June 1630 when he preached and 500 people in one day had "a discernible change wrought upon them." In 1640, eighteen Scottish noblemen met at Cumbernauld to sign the Cumbernauld Bond to oppose the policies of the Earl of Argyll who controlled the dominant political faction in Scotland. Cumbernauld may have been created a Burgh of barony in 1649, although there is some dispute from Hugo Millar. The Earl of Wigton was ordered to garrison the castle in 1650. Cumbernauld Castle was besieged and largely destroyed by Cromwell's General Monck in 1651. Irvine records that the old castle was burned to the ground by "a party of Highlanders during the rebellion of 1715."

Cumbernauld House, which still survives, was designed by William Adam and built in 1731 near the older castle. In 1746, the retreating Jacobite army was billeted for a night in Cumbernauld village. Rather than stay in Cumbernauld House, the commander, Lord George Murray, slept in the village's Black Bull Inn, where he could enforce closer discipline on his soldiers. After the new house was built, the castle was converted to stables, but was accidentally burnt down by dragoons posted there in 1746. The House's grounds, located in the Glen, are used today as a park, known as Cumbernauld Park.

=== Post-Industrial Revolution ===
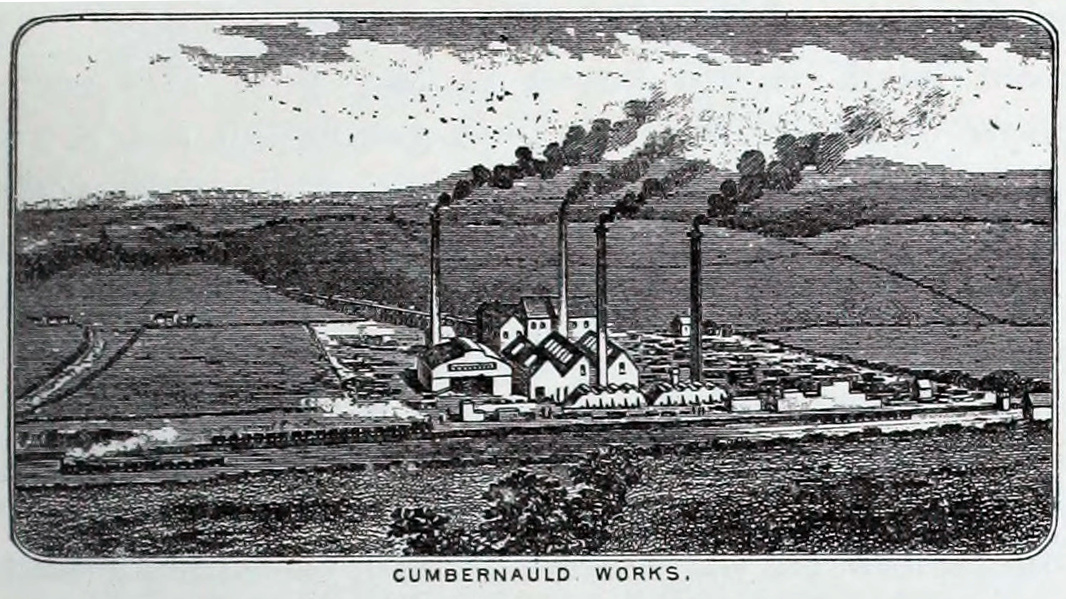
Cumbernauld fire-clay works

Workers laboured on about 40–50 farms and details from 1839 have been recorded for both arable and livestock farming. Some of them were said to make a "very considerable income" for their owners. Weaving was an important part of the town's industry particularly during the Industrial Revolution. Irvine records that in 1841 a fifth of the whole population of 4501 people worked on about 600 hand looms. Cotton weaving was not a lucrative profession; cottage workers struggled to make ends meet especially when competing with ongoing industrialisation. In October 1878, this was compounded by the failure of the Bank of Glasgow in which much of the village's money was invested. Many lowland workers migrated and Groome's Gazetteer 1896 records a dwindling population and states "Handloom weaving of checks and other striped fabrics is still carried on, but mining and quarrying are the staple industry." There tended to be plenty of work, but times were hard even for skilled labourers like the nearby Calton weavers.

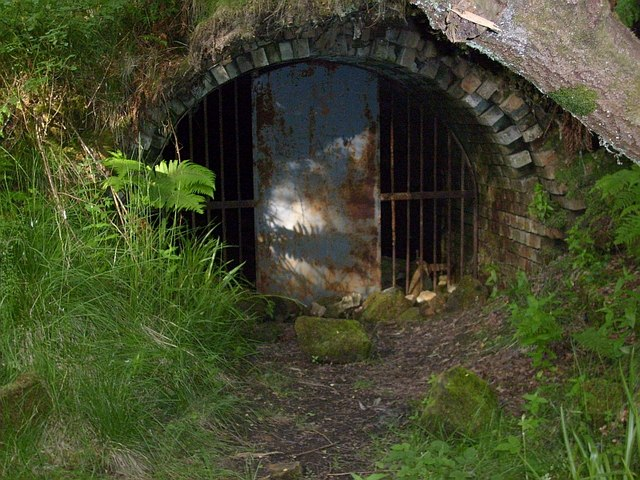
Entrance to disused fireclay mine at Glencryan

The mining and quarrying industries flourished after the completion of the Forth and Clyde Canal in 1790. Quarrying of limestone, coal and clay took place in Cumbernauld, for example at Glencryan, where adits to the old fireclay mines are still clearly visible. Groome's Gazetteer (1882–86) states: "A colliery is at Netherwood [just north of the airport] ironstone has been mined to a small extent by the Carron Company (at Westerwood farm); and limestone, brick-clay, sandstone, and trap are all of them largely worked, the sandstone for building, the trap for road-metal, paving, and rough masonry." The mine at Netherwood was hand-pumped, although other mines in Cumbernauld had machine pumps to clear them of water. There was a fire clay works at Cumbernauld owned by the Glenboig Union Fireclay Company Limited.

Cumbernauld railway station was built by the Caledonian Railway and opened in August 1848 on their line from Gartsherrie (on the former Garnkirk and Glasgow Railway) to Greenhill on the Scottish Central Railway. It closed within a year but re-opened in the 1870s.

Parish records give a snapshot of heads of family's occupations in 1835 and 1839 including several bakers, servants, shoemakers and wrights. The Ordnance Survey Name Books of 1860 provide land-use information from around the same period.

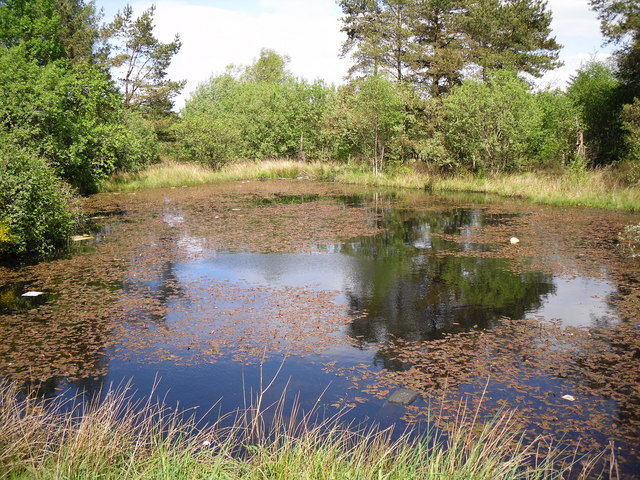
A pool at Fannyside Muir locally known as Jean's Hole

Cumbernauld was long a staging-post for changing horses between Glasgow and Edinburgh and there were several inns and a smiddy as well as half a dozen coaches a day to various towns. Old maps like the 1899 O.S. map show other employment like a gas works and a stocking factory in The Village and a corn mill at Lenziemill close to the old brick and pipe works. Three schools were run but the teachers were not always paid by the heritors. There were several church ministers and the Church of Scotland paid, out of collections, about 25 poor people a week who could not support themselves. Groome also records clerical work as there was a post office, two banks (held two days a week in a room in the inn) and a library with a newsroom.

In 1880, Jane Lindsay (also called Luggie Jean on account of a deformity which gave the impression of having an extra ear) was murdered in a pool of water on the edge of Fannyside Muir, coincidentally near the stream called Luggie Water. A local farmer was charged with her murder. Forensic experts, professors at Glasgow and Edinburgh, appeared as witnesses on opposing sides at the trial, and a not proven verdict was returned.

When shires were first established in Scotland in the twelfth century, the parish of Cumbernauld was included in Stirlingshire. At some point in the fourteenth century it and the neighbouring parish of Kirkintilloch were transferred to Dunbartonshire, despite not adjoining the rest of that shire. The two parishes were briefly restored to Stirlingshire between 1503 and 1509, but from 1509 until 1975 they again formed an exclave of Dunbartonshire. Between 1975 and 1996 Cumbernauld was part of the Cumbernauld and Kilsyth District of Strathclyde region. Since 1996 it has been part of North Lanarkshire. The arms of Cumbernauld and Kilsyth District Council featured the white cattle and the motto of "Daur and Prosper" boldly asserting Dare and Prosper. However the open Bible and the miner's lamp were the only symbols which were carried on to the North Lanarkshire coat of arms.

=== New Town history ===
Cumbernauld was designated a New Town on 9 December 1955. This being in the post-war era there are abundant film, photographic and paper records of this which are now being digitised. There was an inaugural ceremony on 28 June 1957 with Viscount Muirshiel, Secretary of State for Scotland of which some silent, colour footage survives. See the On film and TV section for link to this and other footage from this period. After the Second World War, Glasgow was suffering from a chronic shortage of housing, which was often of poor quality and had residents living in overcrowded and unsafe conditions, particularly in areas such as the Gorbals. As a direct result, the Clyde Valley Regional Plan 1946 allocated sites where satellite new towns were to be built to alleviate the problem through an overspill agreement. Glasgow would also undertake the development of its peripheral housing estates. Cumbernauld was designated as a New Town in 1955, the third to be designated in Scotland. The others were East Kilbride, Glenrothes, Livingston and Irvine (Cowling 1997).

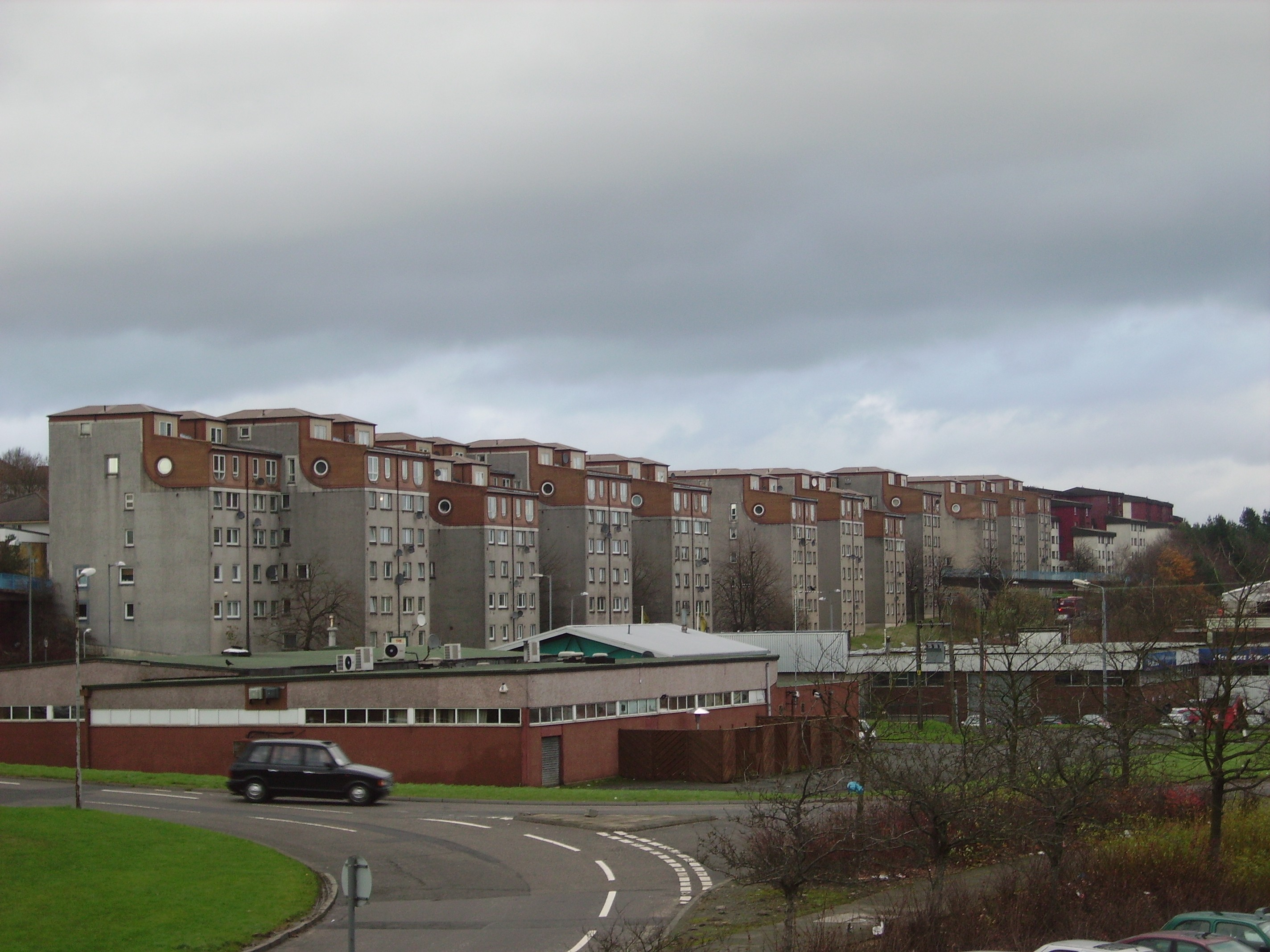
South Carbrain viewed from Cumbernauld railway station

The development, promotion and management was undertaken, until 1996, by the Cumbernauld Development Corporation (CDC). This was a quango appointed by the Secretary of State for Scotland. The area allocated was 4,150 acres (1,680 ha) lying between and incorporating the existing villages of Condorrat and Cumbernauld. The first new housing became available in 1958. An additional 3,638 acres (1,472 ha) was added to the designated town area on 19 March 1973 to accommodate a revised target population of 70,000. Cumbernauld is the clearest example of a modernist new town vision in the UK. Housing was originally built in a series of satellite neighbourhoods clustered around the hilltop town centre. Separation of people and cars was a major element of the first town masterplan, and this was carried through for much of the development of the town. Cumbernauld pioneered designs for underpasses and pedestrian footbridges as well as segregated footpaths. Early neighbourhoods were designed by the CDC and were constructed at Ravenswood, Seafar and Kildrum, north of the Town Centre and Carbrain to the south. Other neighbourhoods were later developed at the Village, Greenfaulds, Condorrat, and Abronhill. Much of the housing in these areas won awards for their innovative designs.

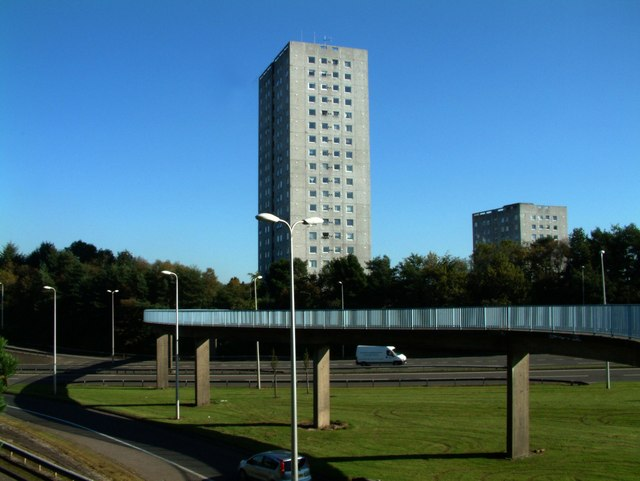
The Snake Bridge (and its shadow) to Stuart House

Cumbernauld town centre's lead designer was Geoffrey Copcutt. Phase 1 was opened by Princess Margaret in 1967, of which some footage survives.

When originally designated as a New Town, the target population was 50,000. In 1961, only five years after becoming a new town, the area to the north of the A80 was added to the town's area with new planned neighbourhoods at Westfield, Balloch, Westerwood and Carrickstone. As a result, a revised target population of 70,000 was set. However, the 2011 UK Census still only shows about 52,000 residents. When Raymond Gillies, a local businessman, gave Cumbernauld the St Enoch's station clock, in 1977, the Queen was celebrating her Silver Jubilee. To mark the occasion, the Queen started the clock using the pendulum motion and unveiled a commemorative plaque at Cumbernauld Town Centre, at the staircase joining the upper mall area with the old Woolco store. The clock is featured in Gregory's Girl and is now in the Antonine Centre. After the creation of the new town, diverse industries such as high-tech, electronics, and chemical and food processing became large employers, along with the Inland Revenue (now His Majesty's Revenue and Customs). The main industrial estates were developed to the east and west along the A80 at Wardpark and Westfield. Areas at Blairlinn and Lenziemill to the south of the town have also been developed for industry.

The Cumbernauld Development Corporation (C.D.C.) disbanded in 1996, and all "rights, liabilities and obligations" were transferred to the North Lanarkshire Council.

=== Modern times ===
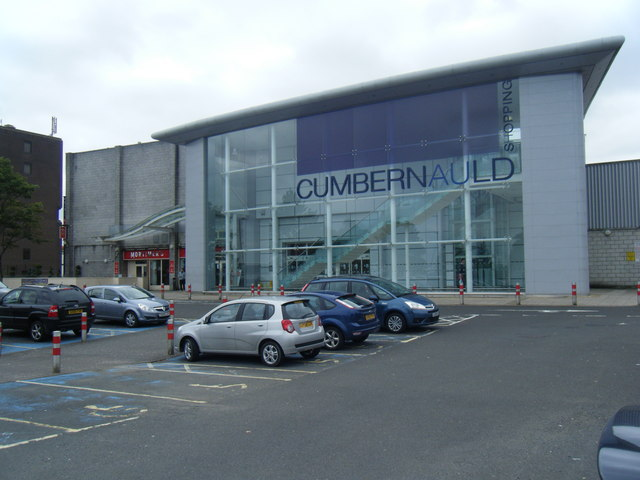
Entrance to Cumbernauld Shopping Centre

The Modern era for the town can be dated from the disbanding of the C.D.C. in 1996. The intended core of Cumbernauld remains the Town Centre buildings, all of which is essentially contained within one structure, segmented into "phases", the first of which was completed in 1967, the latest of which began construction in May 2003 for completion around September 2004. Initially the basic groundwork for the new shops began in 1997 and were finally completed in summer 2007. Designed to be a commerce centre, an entertainment and business venue and a luxury accommodation site, it was widely accepted as Britain's first shopping centre and was the world's first multi-level covered town centre. However, the town never developed to its planned size, and the town centre has never had the life envisaged by town planners. Further expansion has been primarily to provide further space for shops. A substantial portion of the original shopping centre was demolished due to structural damage and has been redeveloped as a new shopping and leisure complex.

The Centre, built in the 1960s to serve the town's commercial needs in one brutalist megastructure, has often been described as one of the ugliest and least-loved examples of post-war design in Scotland. Despite its bad press, Cumbernauld is regarded as representing a significant moment in town design, and in 1993 it was listed as one of the sixty key monuments of post-war architecture by the international conservation organisation DoCoMoMo. In March 2022, the building was scheduled to be demolished.

The original residential structure of Cumbernauld was noteworthy in that there were no pedestrian crossings or traffic light signals of any kind, although this has changed.

== Demography ==
=== Economy ===
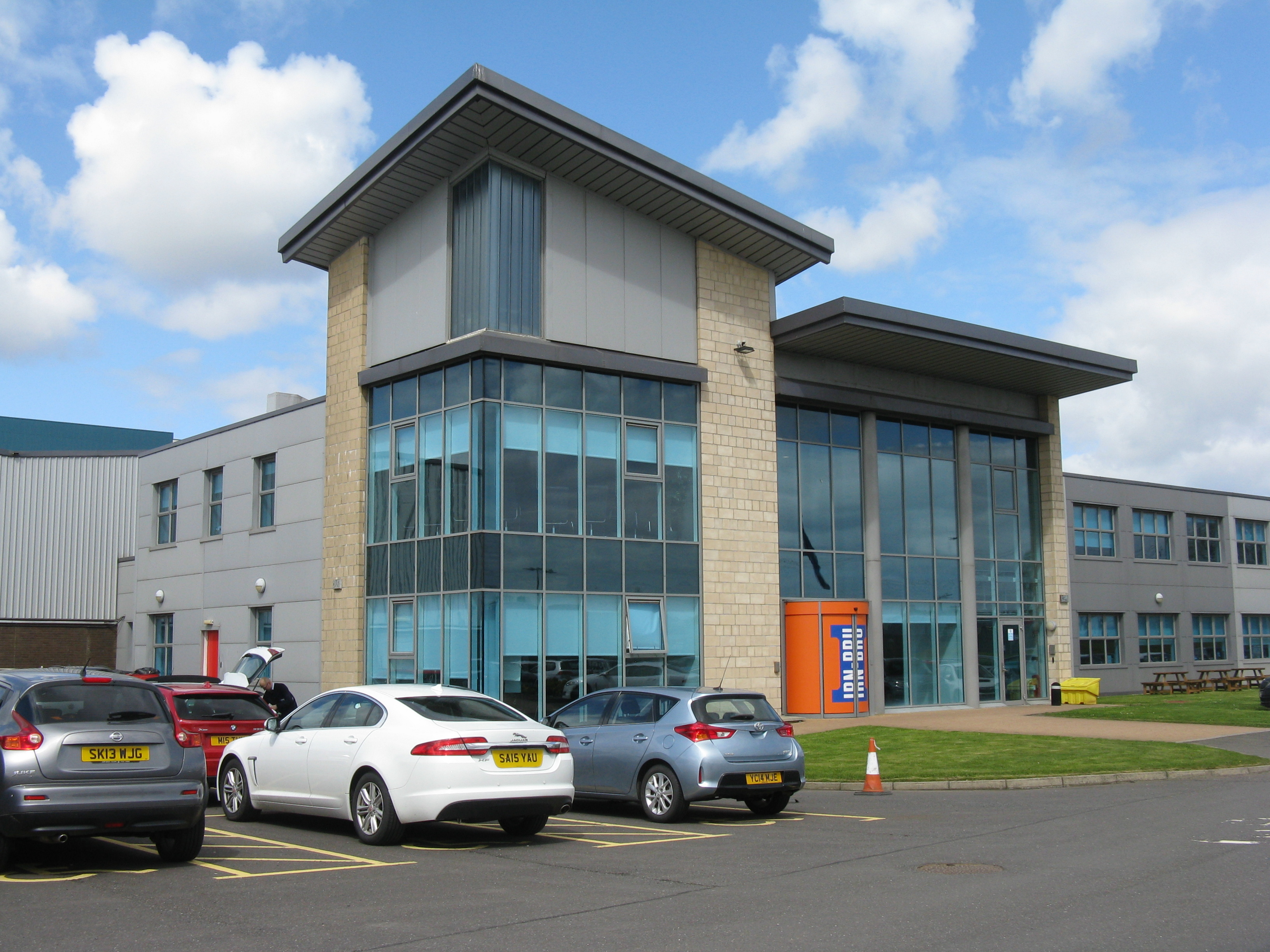
Headquarters of A.G. Barr located in the town

Some well-known companies use Cumbernauld as a base including Mackintosh, and Farmfoods who operate in Blairlinn, Irn-bru makers A.G. Barr also has its world headquarters in the Westfield part of the town. The former Isola-Werke factory in the Wardpark area has been converted into film studios and production facilities for the TV series Outlander which frequently films within the town's greenspaces. In particular, Cumbernauld Glen nature reserve has been used as a backdrop, whose ancient oak forest remnant provides a convenient stand-in for 18th Century Highlands' scenes. In May 2016, North Lanarkshire Council agreed to the expansion the Wardpark site if funding could be found. Another industrial estate Lenziemill is home to Dow Waste Management and furniture maker Aquapac as well as Skyora who manufacture rockets for launching satellites amongst others.

=== Environment ===
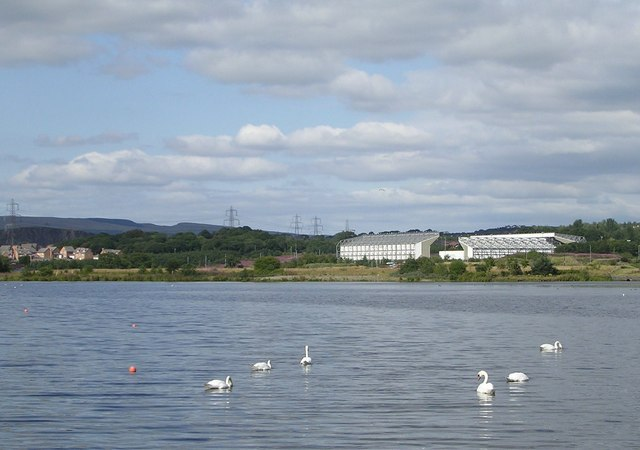
Broadwood Loch

Cumbernauld consists of more than 50% green space, and was designed to incorporate green spaces as a resource for the community. The Scottish Wildlife Trust owns four wildlife reserves in the town – Cumbernauld Glen, Luggiebank Wood, Forest Wood, and Northside Wood. These habitats include ancient oak forest (with attendant bluebell displays in early summer) and large areas of Scots pine coverage.

Cumbernauld (like Ben Lomond) lies on the Scottish watershed, the drainage divide which separates river systems that flow to the east from those that flow to the west. There are two main waterways which flow out of Cumbernauld: the Red Burn (from which the town's Gaelic name is derived) and the Luggie Water (immortalised by David Gray). The Red Burn flows through Cumbernauld Glen and there are walkways alongside this and the Bog Stank. Fannyside Muir, to the south of the town, is part of the Slamannan plateau, an area of 183 hectares of lowland bog. This habitat is being restored by a variety of organisations including the national insect charity Buglife. The plateau is designated as a SSSI (Site of Special Scientific Interest) and an SPA (Special Protection Area), partly because of its nationally important population of Taiga Bean Geese (Anser fabialis fabialis).

There are a large number of parks, and there are also LNRs (Local Nature Reserves) and SINCs (Sites of Importance for Nature Conservation) owned and managed by North Lanarkshire Council. For example St. Maurice's Pond as a SINC and Ravenswood has a LNR. In 1993 Broadwood Loch, a balancing lake, was created by damming the Moss Water and using a plastic waterproof membrane, and a 6-metre (20 ft) wall to hold back the water. This was primarily to prevent flooding downstream but also for recreation.

A landscape scale conservation partnership led by the Scottish Wildlife Trust, the Cumbernauld Living Landscape (CLL), operates in the town with the aim of enhancing, connecting and restoring the greenspaces and improving people's perceptions of and access to them. In 2014, the CLL obtained camera trap footage of pine martens living in the woods within Cumbernauld and the return of this species (formerly extinct across the central belt of Scotland) has become a central plank of the organisation's strategy to improve perceptions of nature in the town.

=== Transport ===
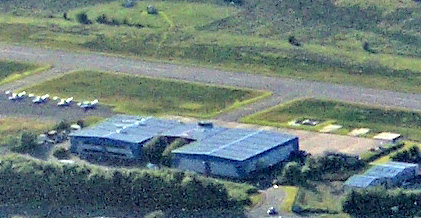
Cumbernauld Airport main building and part of runway.

In terms of public transport, Cumbernauld has bus links to Glasgow, including the airport, Stirling, Falkirk, Dunfermline and St Andrews, which are operated by McGill's Midland Bluebird, FirstGroup and Stagecoach. Various parts of the town are linked by local bus services, operated by smaller companies such as Canavan Travel and Dunn's Coaches. Rail services to and from the town are provided by ScotRail.

The town has rail services to Glasgow, Falkirk, Motherwell, Dalmuir and Edinburgh via Cumbernauld railway station and Greenfaulds. Croy railway station (actually within the Cumbernauld boundary rather than the Croy village boundary) at the north of the town has direct rail services to Edinburgh, Alloa, Dunblane and Glasgow. The lines through Croy and Cumbernauld stations were electrified in 2017 as part of the Edinburgh to Glasgow Improvement Programme (EGIP). Other working lines include the Argyle Line and the North Clyde Line. Nearby motorway links include the M8, M73, M74, M80, M876 and M9. A local campaign was recently initiated to protest at the proposed extension of the M80 within the town limits. The A80 was upgraded to the M80, opening fully in 2011.

Cumbernauld Airport (EGPG) is primarily used for the training of fixed wing and rotary wing pilots, it also has an aircraft maintenance facility. The airport has a CAA Ordinary Licence that allows flights for the public transport of passengers or for flying instruction as authorised by the licensee, Cormack Aircraft Services Limited. The airport was opened by the Cumbernauld Development Corporation in the late 1980s. Before the airport was constructed there was a grass strip in use on the same site.

=== Population ===
Historic population of Cumbernauld
Year	Population
1755	2,303
1791	1,600
1801	1,795
1811	2,176
1821	2,864
1831	3,080
1841	4,501
1851	3,778
1861	3,513
1871	3,602
1881	
1891	4,283
1901	4,905
1911	5,120
1956	3,000
1961	4,065

=== Religion ===
There are currently at least 22 churches in the town which include:

==== Church of Scotland ====
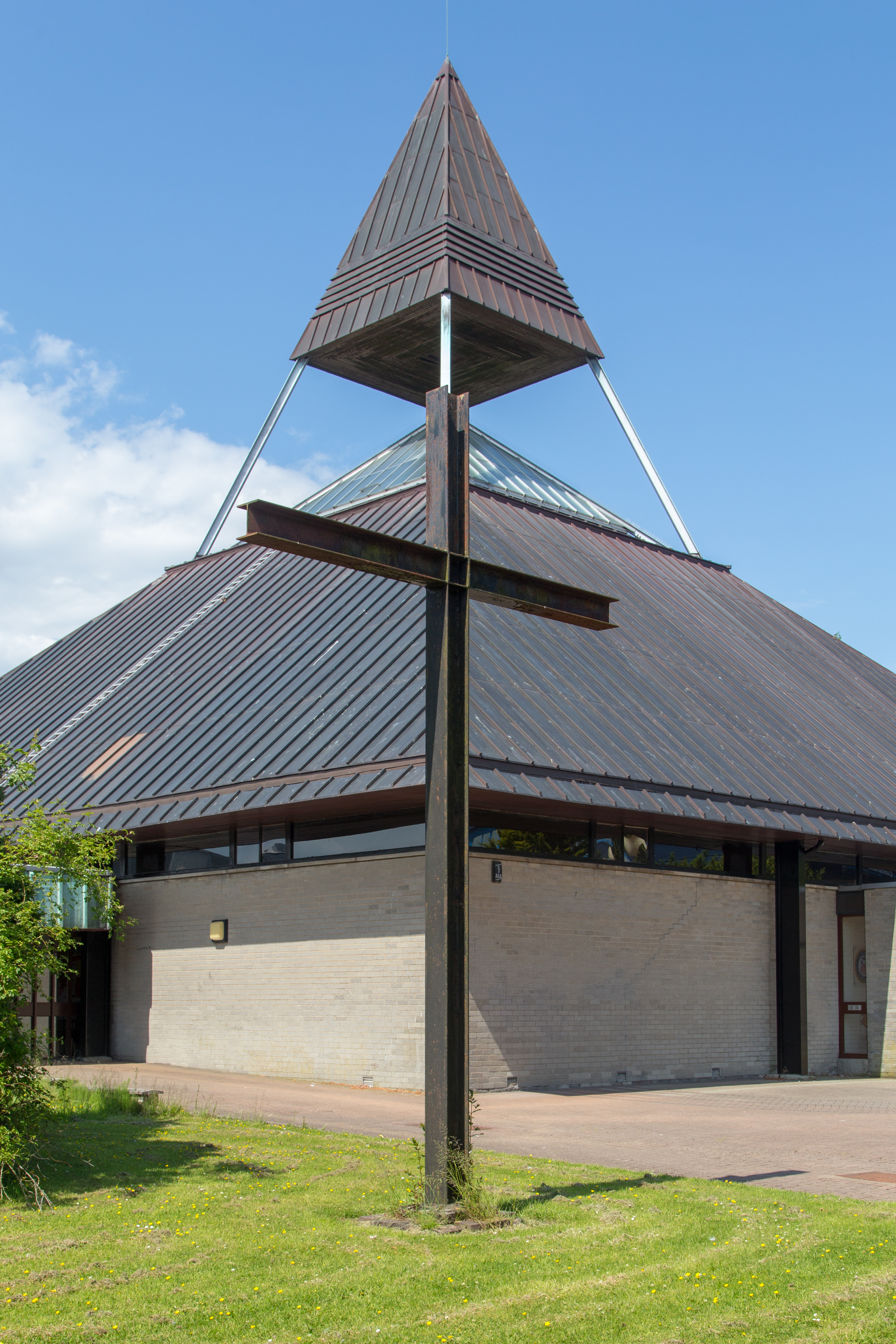
St Mungo's Church(destroyed by fire in August 2025)

- Abronhill Parish Church
- Condorrat Parish Church
- Cumbernauld Old Parish Church

==== Roman Catholic ====
- Our Lady and St. Helen's
- Sacred Heart
- St. Joseph's
- St. Lucy's

==== Other churches ====
- Apostolic Church
- Celestial Church of Christ
- Cumbernauld Baptist Church
- Cornerstone Christian Fellowship
- Craighalbert Church
- Cumbernauld Free Church
- Freedom City Church
- Holy Name Episcopal Church
- Jehovah's Witnesses
- Latter Day Saints Church
- Mossknowe Gospel Hall
- The Salvation Army
- United Presbyterian church."
- United Reformed Church

== Culture ==
=== Media ===
The local Cumbernauld newspaper is the Cumbernauld News. Cumbernauld FM is a community station broadcasting to the town of Cumbernauld and surrounding areas on 106.8 FM and online. The station offers a mix of community news and music programming through shows like Club Happiness and Postcards from the Underground.

The Lanternhouse Theatre was opened in the grounds of Cumbernauld Academy to replace Cumbernauld Theatre which closed in 2019. The theatre company grew out of the community run Cottage Theatre (EST. 1963) set up in 1978 as a charitable trust run civic theatre. Over the years it has built up a favourable reputation on the Scottish arts scene, for both its in-house productions and community outreach initiatives. In 2019 the company won a Fringe First award at the Edinburgh Festival Fringe.

=== Accolades ===
In 1967 the Institute of American Architects voted Cumbernauld the world's best new town conferring the Reynold's Memorial Award. Cumbernauld is a two-time winner of the Carbuncle Awards in 2001 and 2005. The town has since received the award of 'Best Town' at the Scottish Design Awards 2012. The Royal Town Planning Institute (RTPI) awarded the town a certificate in March 2014 for its success as a New Town. In 2015 the Town Centre was awarded the Green Apple Environmental Award. Cumbernauld won the 2013 Beautiful Scotland Award for the best "Small City". It has also received silver medals each year since 2009, the most recent being in 2017. In 2017 Cumbernauld was also awarded the Garden for Life Biodiversity Award.

=== Sport and leisure ===
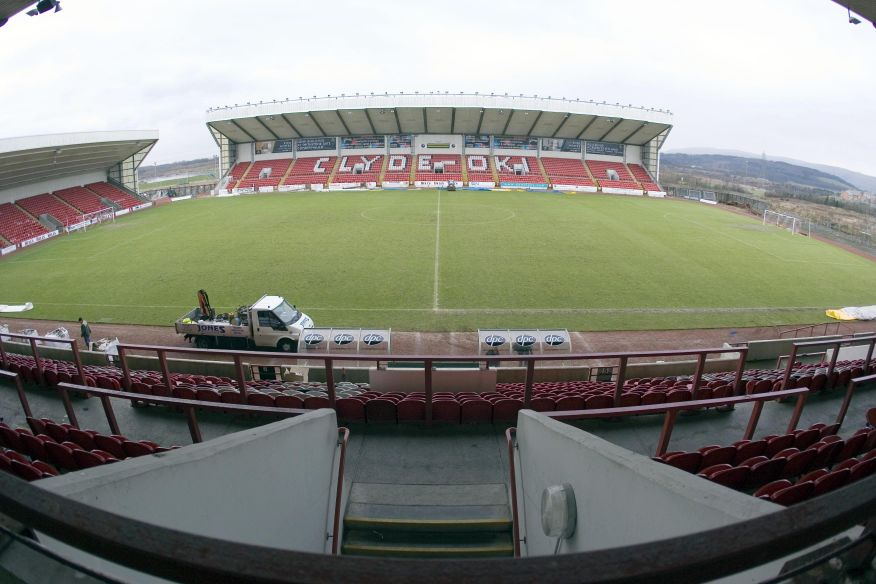
Broadwood Stadium, interior

Cumbernauld hosted Clyde F.C, who play football in the Scottish League Two, who resided at Broadwood Stadium, which was their home since they relocated from their traditional base of Glasgow in February 1994, until 2022. Their prior interim use of other football grounds has led Clyde fans to be known as the "Gypsy Army". The stadium hosts a range of matches including use by Rangers W.F.C. for Champions' League matches.

In 2012, Broadwood Stadium's grass pitch was replaced by a new artificial FIFA standard 3G surface in a partnership between fellow tenants and Lowland League club Cumbernauld Colts, North Lanarkshire Leisure and the local council. Cumbernauld is home to Junior football side Cumbernauld United who play at Guy's Meadow. Five-a-side can be played at Guy's Meadow, Tryst Sports Centre, and Broadwood who also have seven-a-side and full size pitches. Pitches are bookable at Ravenswood and Oak Road too. Broadwood also has a youth-Olympic level BMX track and spin classes for cycling.

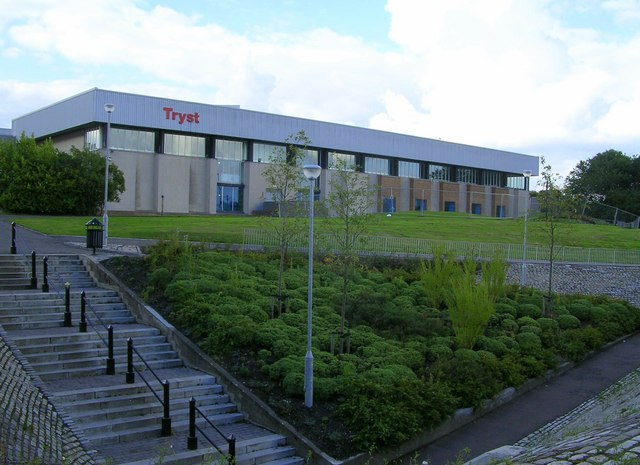
Tryst Sports Centre

The town's rugby team, Cumbernauld RFC, were formed in 1970 and grew to have 3 senior men's teams and several junior teams. The club and council agreed in the late 1970s to develop the Auchenkilns area in Condorrat. The multi-sports facility opened in 1979 and is now shared with Kildrum United FC. They play in West Region League 3, the 7th tier of club rugby in Scotland.

The Cumbernauld Gymnastics Club moved into its base at Broadwood Gymnastics Academy in the early 1990s it, a purpose built building at the same site as Broadwood Stadium. They also have tennis and short tennis at Broadwood. Dance classes are held at a number of location including Cumbernauld Theatre which also has drama classes and programmes.

The Cumbernauld Handball Team, Tryst 77, which in 2007 came second in the British Handball Championships. The Tryst houses the Cumbernauld swimming team, the Tryst Lions wrestling club and squash and badminton courts as well as gyms. Martial arts are practised in The Link, the Tryst and at Broadwood.

The Palacerigg Field Archers, that meets for practice at the Tryst Sports Centre and has an archery course at the nearby Palacerigg Country Park where competitions are held. Palacerigg also has one of the town's three golf courses; the other two are Dullatur Golf Club, and Westerwood, which was designed by Seve Ballesteros and Dave Thomas. Snooker is played at the Red Triangle. Bowls is played in the Village, Abronhill, Ravenswood and in Condorrat. A small attraction World of Wings near Blairlinn houses a collection of birds of prey, offering flying displays and conservation activities.

== Notable people ==
- Ifeoma Dieke (born 1981), Scotland international professional footballer
- Craig Ferguson (born 1962), comedian
- Lynn Ferguson (born 1965), comedian, actor and writer
- Jon Fratelli (born 1979), musician and songwriter - lead singer of The Fratellis
- John Gibb (1831–1909), painter
- Reid Jack (1924–2003), golfer
- Charles Jeffrey (born 1990), fashion designer
- Blair Malcolm (born 1997), footballer
- Jimmy McCulloch (1953-1979), rock guitarist
- Neil Primrose (born 1972), musician - drummer in Travis
- Mitchell Robertson (born 1998), actor and writer

== Twin towns ==
Cumbernauld is twinned with:

- Bron, France

== Governance ==
Cumbernauld has 12 council members out of 77 North Lanarkshire Councillors. Jamie Hepburn is the area's elected MSP for the Scottish Parliament constituency, he is a member of the Scottish National Party. As part of the Central Scotland and Lothians West region there are 7 additional MSPs. Of these three are Reform (Graham Simpson, Mandy Lindsay and Amanda Bland), two are Labour (Mark Griffin and Jenny Young), one is Scottish Greens co-leader Gillian Mackay, and one is former Scottish Conservatives deputy leader Meghan Gallacher.

Katrina Murray is the area's elected MP for the local UK Parliament Constituency of Cumbernauld and Kirkintilloch. She is a member of Scottish Labour. She has, during contributions in the House of Commons, expressed dismay and disdain for Scottish devolution and self-governance, believing her constituents should be ruled by a centralised London.

== Education ==
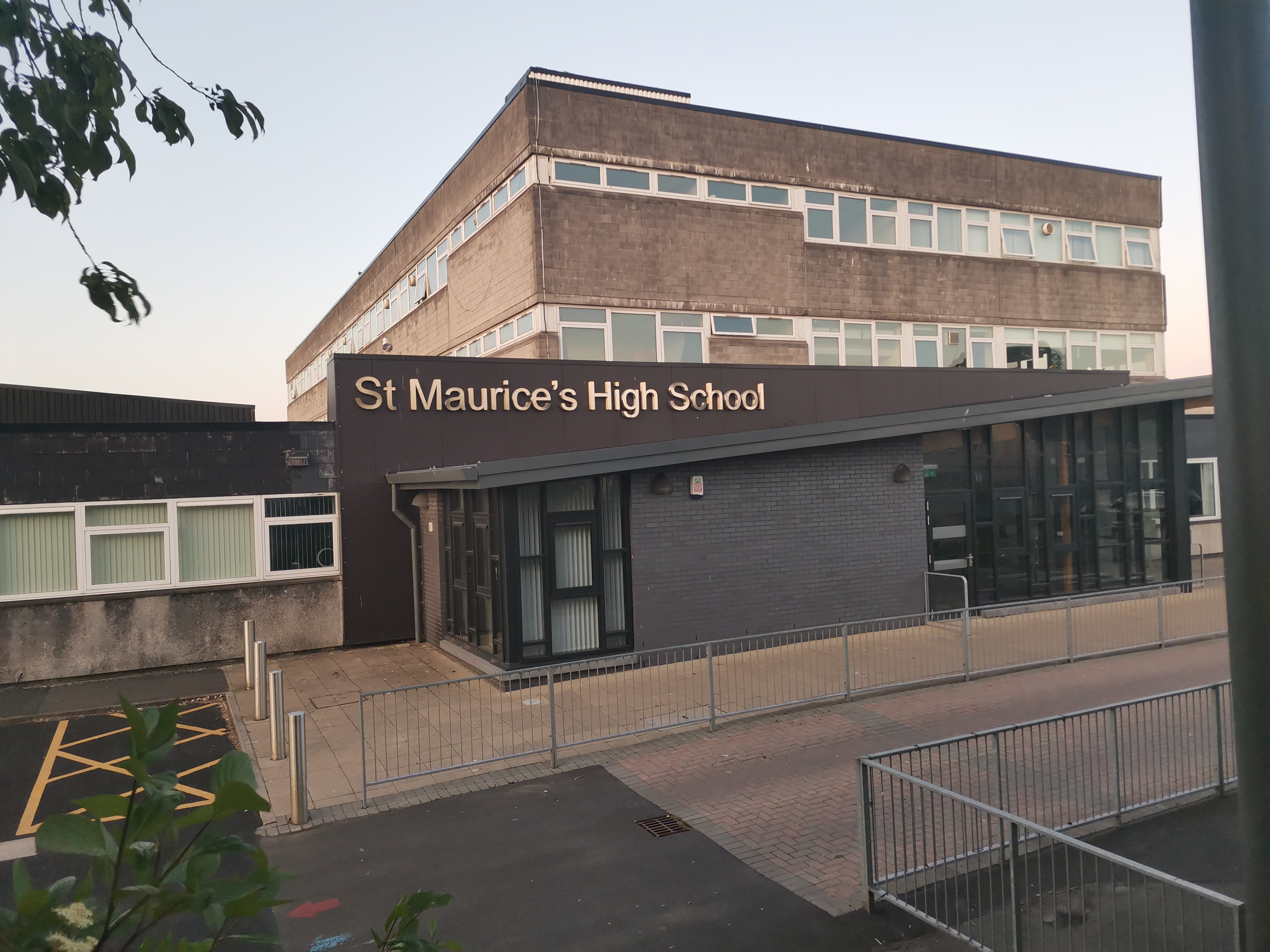
St Maurice's High School

The New Statistical Accounts of Scotland (April 1839) described 3 schools: Cumbernauld Village 80–90 pupils, Condorat [sic] 60–70 pupils, Garbethill [East Fannyside] 20 pupils. It records "few people between 6 and 15 are unable to read the Bible". Groome's Gazetteer (1896) has "Three public schools – Cumbernauld, Condorrat, and Arns (near today's Abronhill) – and Drumglass Church school, with respective accommodation for 350, 229, 50, and 195 children, had (1880) an average attendance of 225, 98, 30, and 171." With the coming of the railway a new school was built after some controversy. Opening in 1886, it was known as the Southern District School and was close to the railway station.

Historical New Town primary schools include: Cumbernauld Primary (village), Glenhead Primary, Hillcrest Primary (Carbrain Temporary School), Langlands Primary, Melrose Primary, Sacred Heart Primary, Seafar Primary, and St Joseph's, Now known as St. Margaret of Scotland Primary.

Historical New Town secondary schools include: Abronhill High (Closed as of July 2014) and Cumbernauld High (became Cumbernauld Academy).

=== Primary schools ===
- Abronhill Primary
- Baird Memorial Primary
- Carbrain Primary
- Condorrat Primary
- Cumbernauld Primary
- Eastfield Primary
- Kildrum Primary
- Ravenswood Primary
- St. Andrew's Primary
- St. Helen's Primary
- St. Lucy's Primary
- St. Margaret of Scotland Primary
- St. Mary's Primary
- Westfield Primary
- Whitelees Primary
- Woodlands Primary

=== Secondary schools ===
- Cumbernauld Academy with new school building which opened in 2019, the old building (as Cumbernauld High School) has since been demolished.
- Greenfaulds High School with new school building which opened in September 2016, old building has since been demolished.
- Our Lady's High School
- St. Maurice's High School

=== Specialist schools ===
- Glencryan School
- Redburn School

=== Further education ===
- New College Lanarkshire (formerly Cumbernauld College)

== Residential areas of the town ==
Many of Cumbernauld's residential areas retain the names of previous farms in their vicinity.

Pre-New Town Villages:

- Condorrat
- Cumbernauld Village
- Castlecary*
- Dullatur*
- Luggiebank*

New Town Residential Neighbourhoods:

- Abronhill
- Auchenkilns
- Balloch
- Blackwood
- North and South Carbrain
- Carrickstone
- Craigmarloch
- Eastfield
- Greenfaulds
- Kildrum
- Luggiebank
- Ravenswood
- Seafar
- Smithstone
- Westerwood
- Westfield
- Whitelees

*Note that Castlecary, Dullatur and Luggiebank were not originally planned to be included in Cumbernauld as the new town was designed, but the 1996 reorganisation of local authorities brought them into the North Lanarkshire Council area and they have become de-facto areas of the town for the purposes of all local services planning.

== See also ==
- List of places in North Lanarkshire
- List of settlements in Scotland by population
