= Ravenswood Historic District =

Ravenswood Historic District may refer to:

- East Ravenswood Historic District, Chicago, IL, listed on the NRHP in Illinois
- Ravenswood Manor Historic District, Chicago, IL, listed on the NRHP in Illinois
- Ravenswood "Old Town" Historic District, Ravenswood, WV, listed on the NRHP in West Virginia
