= Craigmarloch =

Suburb of Cumbernauld, North Lanarkshire, Scotland

Coordinates: 55.958°N 4.021°W

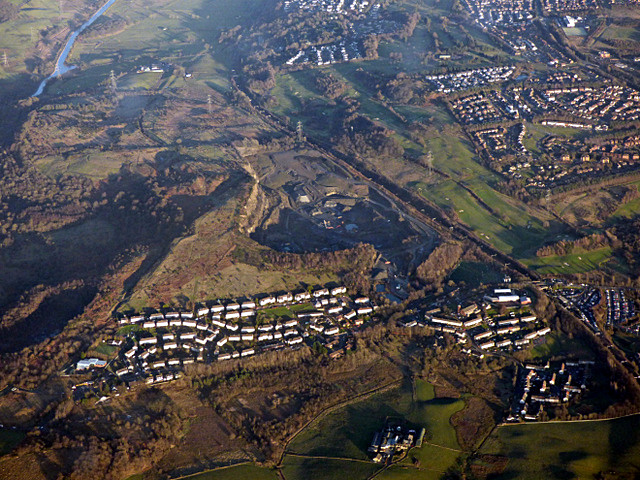
Croy Quarry with Dullatur Golf Course and Craigmarloch on the right

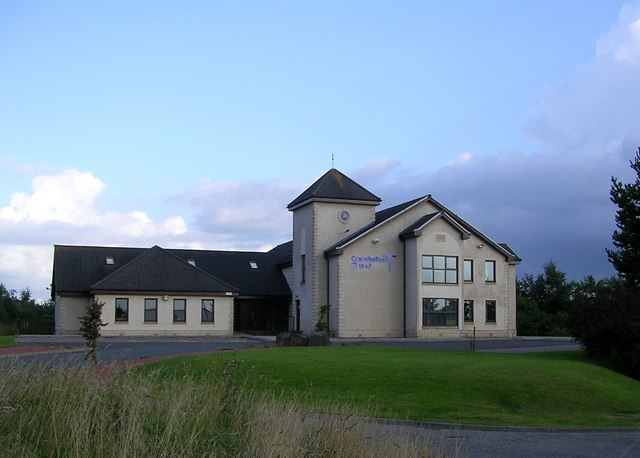
Craighalbert Church, Cumbernauld

Craigmarloch (Scottish Gaelic: Creag a' Mheirleich) a private residential area of the town of Cumbernauld in North Lanarkshire, Scotland. It was the last such area that the Cumbernauld Development Corporation (CDC) laid out and began to construct. The area is designed to be like a village, with features such as: a village green, a main street, focal points, gateways, water features and recreational and community facilities. The responsibility for the development of the area passed from the CDC to North Lanarkshire Council in 1996.

The area was known as Auchinbee, and was built on the lands of the Auchinbee Farm. The farm house has been developed into a nursery. The name Craigmarloch, was taken from an area to the north close to Kilsyth and adjacent to the Forth and Clyde Canal, approximately 2 miles (3.2 km) away. The older site was a stop on the canal.

Around the main residential area is the Dullatur Golf Course with two main courses. The area also has Roman links as an ancient Roman Path runs between the Joint Schools Campus and the Craighalbert Centre.

The area is very well connected to the rest of Scotland and the UK by being only a short drive from all of the major motorway networks. Croy train station only a short walk or drive away, allows a very speedy and direct commute into Glasgow, Edinburgh, Falkirk and Stirling as well as many other destinations. The frequency of the trains and volume of car parking available means Cumbernauld North is a possible commuting location.
