= Ravenswood, Cumbernauld =

Suburb of Cumbernauld, Scotland

Coordinates: 55.944°N 4.003°W

Ravenswood is an area of Cumbernauld, Scotland.

== History ==
Ravenswood, sometimes known as Bogedge, was formerly a retreat for Glasgow churchmen. There are records of an Episcopal chapel there. Ravenswood is also called Bogedge on old maps. The remains of a mill from Ravenswood Farm can still be traced.

== New Town district ==
The street-naming scheme is based on Scottish islands. Ravenswood Primary School and Our Lady's High School are both in this area of the town. Early in the new town's history Ravenswood was more distinct from Seafar than it now is possibly due to the building schedule and signage on paths. More recently Seafar is more dominant perhaps because Ravenswood did not appear on any road signs until 2023.

Ravenswood has its own Local Nature Reserve.

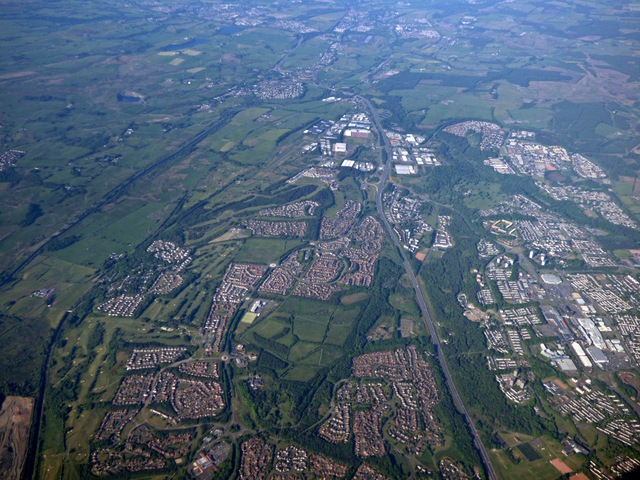
Ravenswood lies between the Town Centre and the M80, adjacent to Seafar.
