= The Centre Cumbernauld =

Shopping centre in Cumbernauld, Scotland

Coordinates: 55.94683°N 3.99042°W

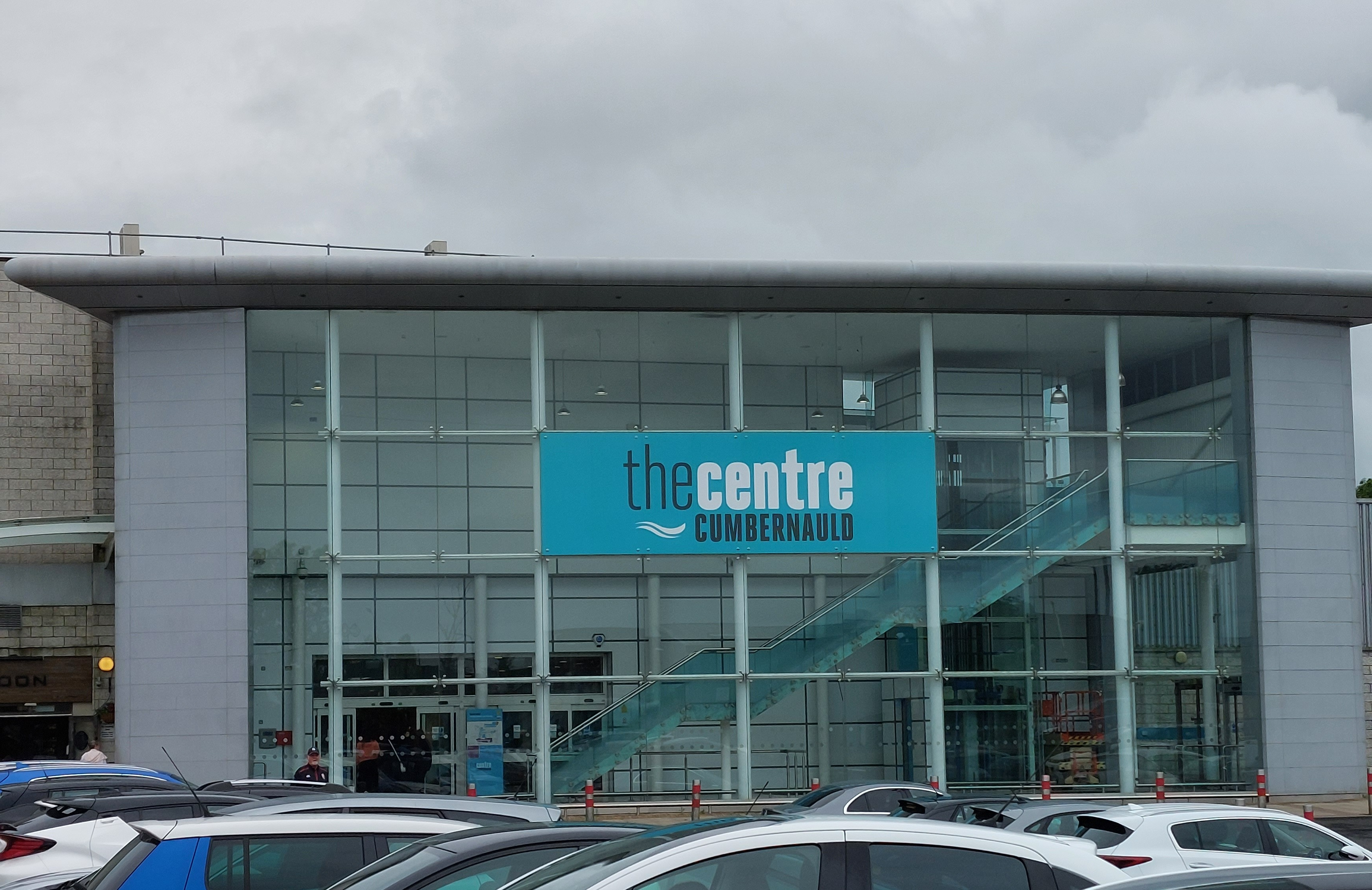
- The Centre Cumbernauld, 2023

- Location within Scotland

General information
- Architectural style: Brutalism (formerly)
- Location: Cumbernauld, Scotland
- Current tenants: 75 tenants
- Construction started: 1963
- Opened: 25 May 1967
- Owner: Belgate Estates, Glasgow
- Landlord: Gatehouse Property Management, Glasgow

Technical details
- Floor count: Eight
- Floor area: 412,550 sq ft

Design and construction
- Architecture firm: Leslie Hugh Wilson, Dudley Roberts Leaker Geoffrey Copcutt, Philip Aitken, Neil Dadge
- Main contractor: Cumbernauld Development Corporation

Website
- www.thecentrecumbernauld.com

The Centre Cumbernauld (formerly Cumbernauld town centre and The Cumbernauld Shopping Centre) is the commercial centre of the new town of Cumbernauld, Scotland. It was designed in the 1950s—as what became known as a megastructure—to be a town centre consisting of "one huge multi-storey building," according to its preliminary planning report, housing shops, apartments, a hotel, ice rink, police station and other amenities. The building was designed to be expanded upon after its initial construction. Each time the building floorplan was modified the building was said to be in a new "phase", with Phase 1 being the original floorplan.

Phase 1 was completed between 1963 and 1967, and the centre was opened by Princess Margaret and Lord Snowdon in May 1967. It was expanded several times, including in 2007 by the addition of the Antonine Centre, a shopping centre that is linked to the older structure by walkways and lifts.

The development, promotion, and management of The Centre Cumbernauld was undertaken by the Cumbernauld Development Corporation (CDC), until the dissolution of the CDC by government order in 1996. Ownership of the building was then transferred to the North Lanarkshire Council.

The facility has been subject to harsh criticism over the years. It was voted "Britain's most hated building" in 2005, in a poll organised by Channel 4's programme Demolition, and was twice named Scotland's worst town centre by the Carbuncle Awards. The brutalist structure was called "a rabbit warren on stilts" by the 2001 Carbuncle judging panel. The top section of the building has been dubbed by writers including author Caro Ramsay as the "Alien's Head", due to local people observing a resemblance to fictional character E.T. (Note: See:)

In March 2022, North Lanarkshire Council announced plans to demolish the building.

== Design and initial construction ==
Cumbernauld was designated as a New Town in December 1955 under the New Towns Act 1946 (9 & 10 Geo. 6. c. 68), as part of a plan to move 550,000 people out of Glasgow and into nearby planned or redeveloped towns to solve the city's overcrowding. (Note: Other new towns were East Kilbride (1947), Glenrothes (1948), Livingston (1962) and Irvine (1966).) The idea behind the Cumbernauld town centre was to create a singular megastructure, in the brutalist style, to "accommodate all the retail, municipal, and leisure needs" of a town of 50,000–80,000 people (although architecture historian John R. Gold notes that the term megastructure was first coined in 1964).

Regarded at the time as a "milestone in urban design," the town centre was intended to be surrounded by high-density housing without shops or other amenities, with each neighbourhood connected to the structure by pathways so that residents could easily walk there. This centralization of amenities was unlike other New Town developments, which typically built retail spaces within each new neighbourhood. Architectural critic Wolf von Eckardt wrote in Harper's in 1965:

Leonardo da Vinci, nearly five hundred years ago, envisioned a city where all the vehicles move underground, leaving man to move freely in the sun. Leonardo might also have sketched Cumbernauld's town center, a soaring citadel surrounded by meadow."

Construction of the town centre began under contractors Duncan Logan, chief architect Leslie Hugh Wilson and architect Geoffrey Copcutt (until 1962 and 1963), and later Dudley Roberts Leaker, Philip Aitken and Neil Dadge. The construction of Phase 1 lasted from 1963 to 1967. Princess Margaret and Lord Snowden opened the centre on 25 May 1967. Built over a dual carriageway, it housed shops, a hotel, ice rink, bowling alley, health centre and penthouse apartments, as well as police, fire and ambulance stations. There was also a library and technical college. Historian Rosemary Wakeman called it a "colossal living vessel" intended to "elicit new codes of community behavior." According to an Open University article, it was a "strange tribute to a moment when it was thought that old cities, with their narrow streets, haphazard layout, and confused, illogical centres were a thing of the past." Open University also claims the town centre was "Britain's first indoor shopping mall".

== Development under the Cumbernauld Development Corporation ==
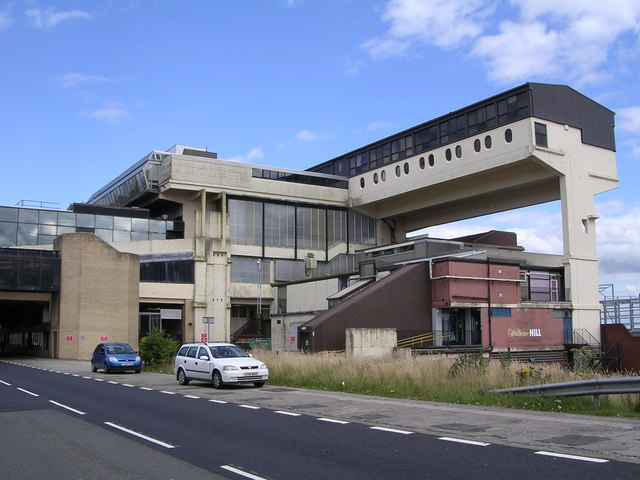
Cumbernauld town centre, 2006

By 1971 the town centre contained the largest supermarket in Scotland, and work on Phase 2 had begun.

The CDC later sought the building of a department store, completed in 1975 as Phase 3. It was built for Woolco with two levels of underground parking, and was later sold to Gateway in 1986. Asda purchased the site in 1988 and maintained the "Red Balloon Cafe" that was widely implemented in Gateway stores.

In the mid-70s the Golden Eagle Hotel, which had been constructed as part of Phase 1, closed after a vehicle crashed into the building.

In 1977, the St Enoch railway station in Glasgow was demolished. The St Enoch Station Clock was sent to auction instead of being lost, and was bought by the Raymond Gillies Foundation, who gifted it to Cumbernauld during the celebration of the "New Town's 21st birthday". This donation was intended to express the connection between Glasgow and Cumbernauld. The former station clock was installed in Cumbernauld Town Centre at the foot of the stairway which joined the Phase 1 upper shopping level to a walkway leading to Phase 3. Queen Elizabeth II and the Duke of Edinburgh attended the celebrations at Cumbernauld that year, as part of the queen's Silver Jubilee, unveiling a commemorative plaque for the St Enoch Clock.

Phase 4 was completed in 1981. On Monday 26 July 1982, the Golden Eagle Hotel was demolished.

The structure was purchased by a shopping management group in 1996 when Cumbernauld Development Corporation was wound up.

== Developments under the Campsies Centre Cumbernauld Ltd. ==
On 17 August 1995, the Campsies Centre Cumbernauld Limited (CCCL) was incorporated as a Private Limited Company (Note: At the time this PLC was known as Pacific Shelf 651 Limited) for the sole purpose of "redevelop[ing] Cumbernauld town centre, its environs and associated areas". The Cumbernauld Development Corporation transferred to The Centre Cumbernauld and all of its associated lands to the CCCL.

The CCCL planned a new retail and leisure development by the name of the Campsies Centre, with a budget of £50 million (1996) (equivalent to £94.08 million or US$120.24 million in 2024). Property company Arrowcroft was initially chose to develop the Campsies Center as a 300,000 square feet (28,000 m^{2}) space, but was dropped from the project in November 1996. As a result of being dropped, Arrowcroft declared a lawsuit against the North Lanarkshire Council, who controlled the development of Campsies Centre through the CCCL.

The Antonine Centre, sometimes known as Phase 5, was developed by London and Regional Properties for a cost of £40 million (2007) (equivalent to £61.61 million or US$78.74 million in 2024), and built on the sites of two previous phases. To make way for the new development, the Phase 3 shopping center was demolished in 1996, and the rear outdoor section of Phase 1 was demolished in 2001. Construction began in January of 2006, and the Antonine Centre was opened on 6 June 2007 by Princess Anne, containing 350,000 square feet (33,000 m^{2}) of additional retail space. The Antonine Centre connects to Phase 1 and the Phase 4 shopping center with internal walkways, as the indoor spaces of past Phases were.

The St Enoch Clock was removed from display when the connection between Phase 1 and Phase 3 was demolished in 1996, in order to connect Phase 1 to the Antonine Centre. The clock was not hung back up for display until 2007, when the Antonine Centre was opened and the clock returned to the Center Cumbernauld. The clock now faces a different direction and is mounted in a slightly different location within the same passageway. An Edinburgh-based firm of clock specialists who cared for the clock were the ones who performed its transfer.

In December of 2004, Phase 4 received a "multi-million pound refurbishment".

At some point after 2007, the display area for the St Enoch Clock was "sealed off from the public amid developments at the shopping centre", again removing the clock from public viewing until March of 2019.

As of 6 April 2016, the only Person with Significant Control over the CCCL was the North Lanarkshire Council.

In February 2019, it was announced that CCCL was "to be dissolved and its assets ring-fenced for the benefit of the town." The CCCL's assets, valued on 31 December 2017 at £3.2 million (2017) (equivalent to £4.1 million or US$5.25 million in 2024), were to be transferred to the North Lanarkshire City Council.

== Demolition plans ==
In March 2022, North Lanarkshire Council announced that they had reached a deal with the building's owners to purchase and demolish it in the future. Eight months later, Historic Environment Scotland confirmed that the centre had been nominated and assessed for listed status (Note: Listed status would have conferred protections from demolition.) and would have met their special interest criteria, but the decision had been taken not to list it due to the advanced stage of the redevelopment plans. North Lanarkshire Council successfully purchased The Centre Cumbernauld in June of 2023.

== See also ==
- DoCoMoMo Key Scottish Monuments
- List of brutalist structures
- Prospect 100 best modern Scottish buildings
