= Cardowan =

Coordinates: 55.887832°N 4.138037°W

Cardowan: Scottish Gaelic: Cathair Domhainn
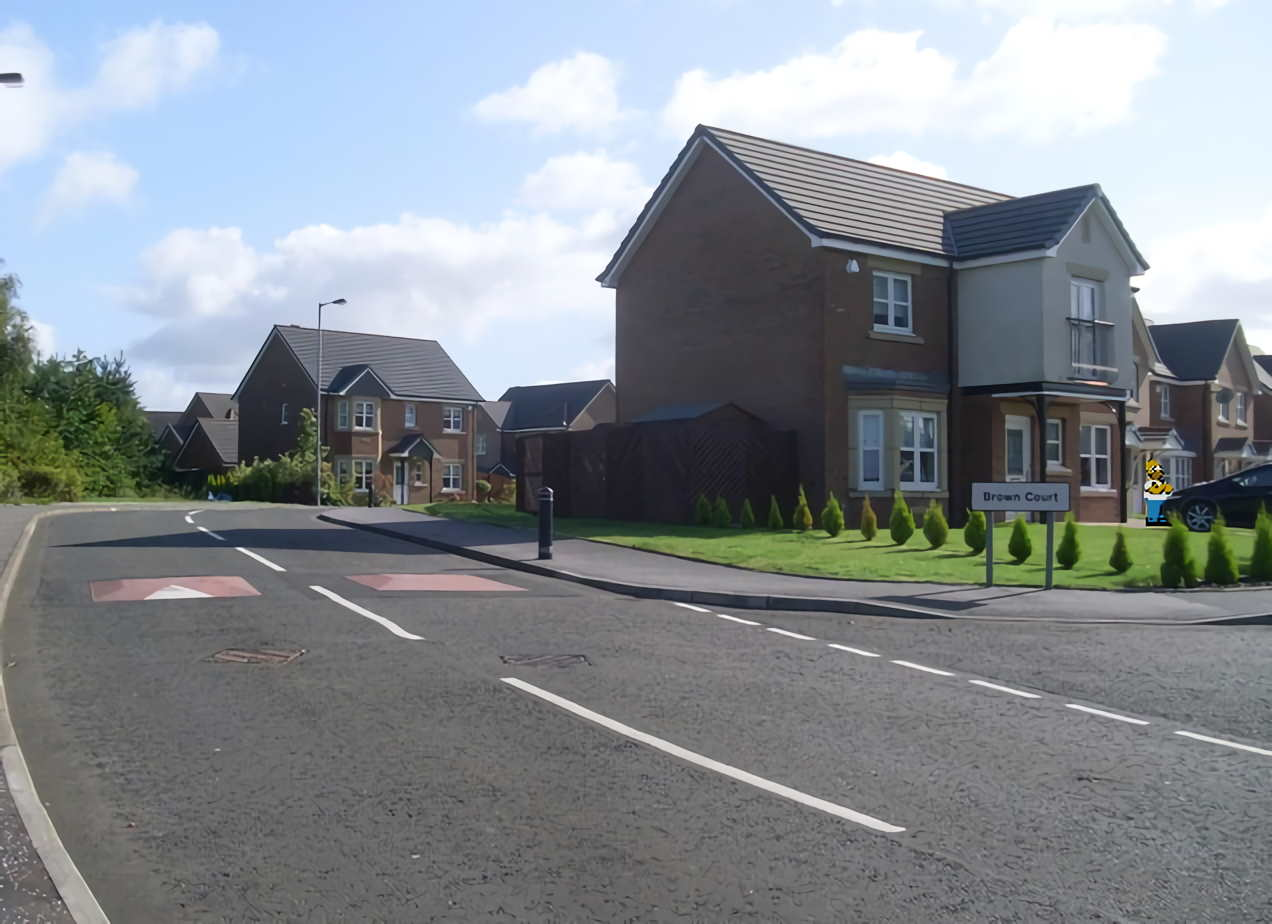
- Brown Court, part of the new development east of Cardowan Road.

- Location within Scotland Cardowan (Scotland)
- Population: Unknown
- OS grid reference: NS665682
- Lieutenancy area: Lanarkshire
- Country: Scotland
- Sovereign state: United Kingdom
- Post town: GLASGOW
- Postcode district: G33
- Dialling code: 0141
- Police: Scotland
- Fire: Scottish
- Ambulance: Scottish
- UK Parliament: Coatbridge, Chryston and Bellshill
- Scottish Parliament: Coatbridge and Chryston

Cardowan is a suburb situated in North Lanarkshire, Scotland, on the north-eastern outskirts of Glasgow.

Originally built around Cardowan Colliery, Garnkirk fire-clay works and clay mines in the immediate area, Cardowan's proximity to Glasgow has been key to its expansion over the years, which has seen the former colliery site being transformed into a large scale residential development.

== History ==
The oldest documented reference to Cardowan comes from the Charters of David I of Scotland regarding the lands around Cardowan, Easter Cardowan, and Cardowan Muir. These areas of land currently include the Forestry Commission's Cardowan Moss and the village of Cardowan.

The oldest surviving buildings in the area are St. Joseph's RC Church, the original St. Joseph's School, Craigendmuir House, as well as older structures in adjacent Stepps. Excluding Cardowan Drive and the northern end of Cardowan Road which are often regarded as being part of Stepps, the earliest housing in the area which is still existing was built in the late 1930s to early 40s and served to replace housing in the (now extinct) nearby villages of Garnkirk and Heathfield.

The streets of Cardowan Road, Clayhouse Road, and Frankfield Road were constructed first, with the easternmost end of the latter being renamed Ardtoe Crescent and Place and Dorlin Road a short time later. Thereafter further housing was built in the 1950s creating the streets of Craigendmuir Road, Comedie Road and an extension to Clayhouse Road. Following this in the 1960s, Drimnin Road, and Mossview Road (including Resipol Road and Gaskin Path) were completed. Due to the shortages of building materials during the second World War the last five blocks on Frankfield Road were built with flat roofs which were only replaced in the 1980s. The 1980s also brought the construction of Blaneview and further housing on Clayhouse Road, and in the 1990s Nicholson Court was built on the site of the original Stepps railway station and sidings.

=== Cardowan Colliery ===
The mine at Cardowan was the site of several accidents including the explosion of 1927 in which on 1 August at 3:50pm 3 men were killed. (John Kilpatrick, Maurice M'Bride, George Jackson) A further explosion occurred in 1932 on 16 November in which 11 men were killed. (William Bradley, Michael Flynn, Peter Frati (formerly Jacobelli), William McAlister, John McNab, James McVey, Richard Maroney, George Mullen, James Reynolds, John Watt, John Whiteford) Then again in Jan 1982 there was another explosion at some 1700 feet underground and 2 miles from the pithead, resulting in 41 injuries. The mine finally closed at the end of 1983.

== Transport ==
The fastest method of public transport to Glasgow or Cumbernauld is by train from Stepps. A bus service operates from Cumbernauld Road which also connects the above destinations. By road, there is a choice of routes; to Glasgow or Edinburgh via the M80 and the M8. The M80 to Cumbernauld and Stirling also provides access to the M73, leading to the M74 southbound to Hamilton, Carlisle and onto the M6 to England.

	North: Stepps, Lenzie
West: Millerston, Glasgow	Cardowan	East: Chryston, Cumbernauld
	South: Garthamlock
