= Jock Shaw =

Scottish footballer

Personal information
- Full name: John Shaw
- Date of birth: 29 November 1912
- Place of birth: Annathill, Scotland
- Date of death: 13 June 2000 (aged 87)
- Place of death: Glenboig, Scotland
- Position: Defender

Senior career*
Years	Team	Apps	(Gls)
–	Benburb		
1933–1938	Airdrieonians	174	(5)
1938–1953	Rangers	169	(1)
Total		343	(6)

International career
1936–1947	Scottish Football League XI	2	(0)
1941–1946	Scotland (wartime)	6	(0)
1946–1947	Scotland	6	(0)
- * Club domestic league appearances and goals

John Shaw (29 November 1912 – 13 June 2000) was a Scottish professional footballer who played as a defender, most famous for his time at Rangers, where he was captain between 1938 and 1950.

== Career ==
Rangers signed Shaw, known as 'Tiger' for his tough, physical style of play, from Airdrieonians for £2,000 in July 1938. He went on make over 600 appearances for the Ibrox club, winning four Scottish league championships, three Scottish Cups and two League Cups. Shaw holds the distinction of being the captain of the first Scottish club to lift "the treble" of League, League Cup and Scottish Cup. After retirement in 1953 he remained associated with the club as third-team trainer and later groundsman.

Shaw was capped six times by Scotland. His brother Davie was also a Scottish international, who played for Hibernian and Aberdeen.

== Later life ==
Shaw lived for the majority of his life close to his Annathill birthplace, in the larger village of Glenboig; he died there on 13 June 2000.

== See also ==
- List of Scotland national football team captains
- List of Scotland wartime international footballers
- List of Scottish football families
