= Gartloch =

Coordinates: 55.878851°N 4.107747°W

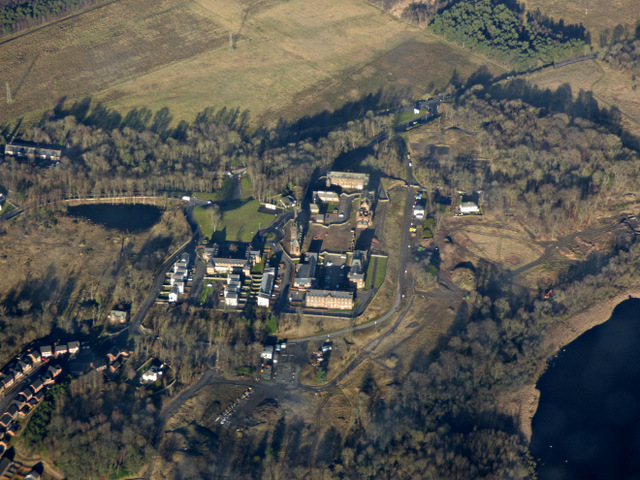
- Gartloch Village from the air, 2018

- Location within Glasgow
- Population: 650 (2020)
- OS grid reference: NS682670
- Council area: Glasgow City Council
- Lieutenancy area: Glasgow
- Country: Scotland
- Sovereign state: United Kingdom
- Post town: GLASGOW
- Postcode district: G69
- Dialling code: 0141
- Police: Scotland
- Fire: Scottish
- Ambulance: Scottish
- UK Parliament: Glasgow East
- Scottish Parliament: Glasgow Provan

Gartloch (/ɡɑːrtˈlɒx/) is a residential village in Glasgow, Scotland. Outwith the city's urban area (the closest contiguous district being Easterhouse), it is very close to the boundary with North Lanarkshire, south of Garnkirk and west of Gartcosh. To the south is Bishop Loch, a nature reserve and the body of water referred to in the village name, which forms part of the Seven Lochs Wetland Park.

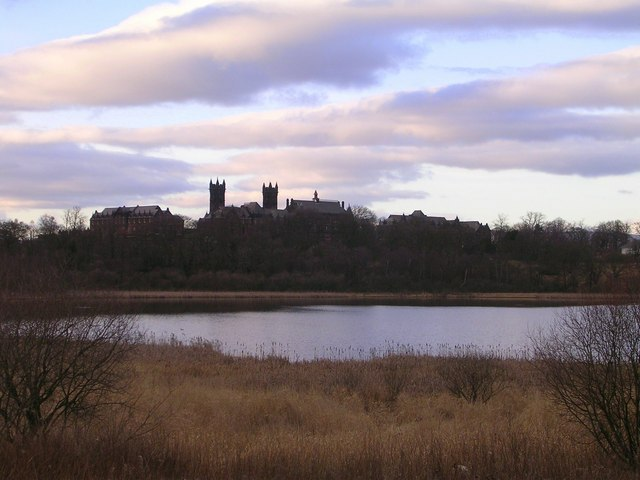
View from Bishop Loch to Gartloch

Much of the new village was created by the renovation of several of the buildings that made up Gartloch Hospital (also known as Gartloch Asylum) which opened in 1896 and closed in 1996. New houses have also been built in the surrounding area.

Gartloch is within driving distance – about 1 1/2 miles or 2.5 kilometres – from the Glasgow Fort cinema and retail park complex on the periphery of the Glasgow urban area at Garthamlock next to Junction 10 of the M8 motorway, and is around the same distance in the opposite direction from Junction 2A of the M73 motorway and Gartcosh railway station.

== History ==
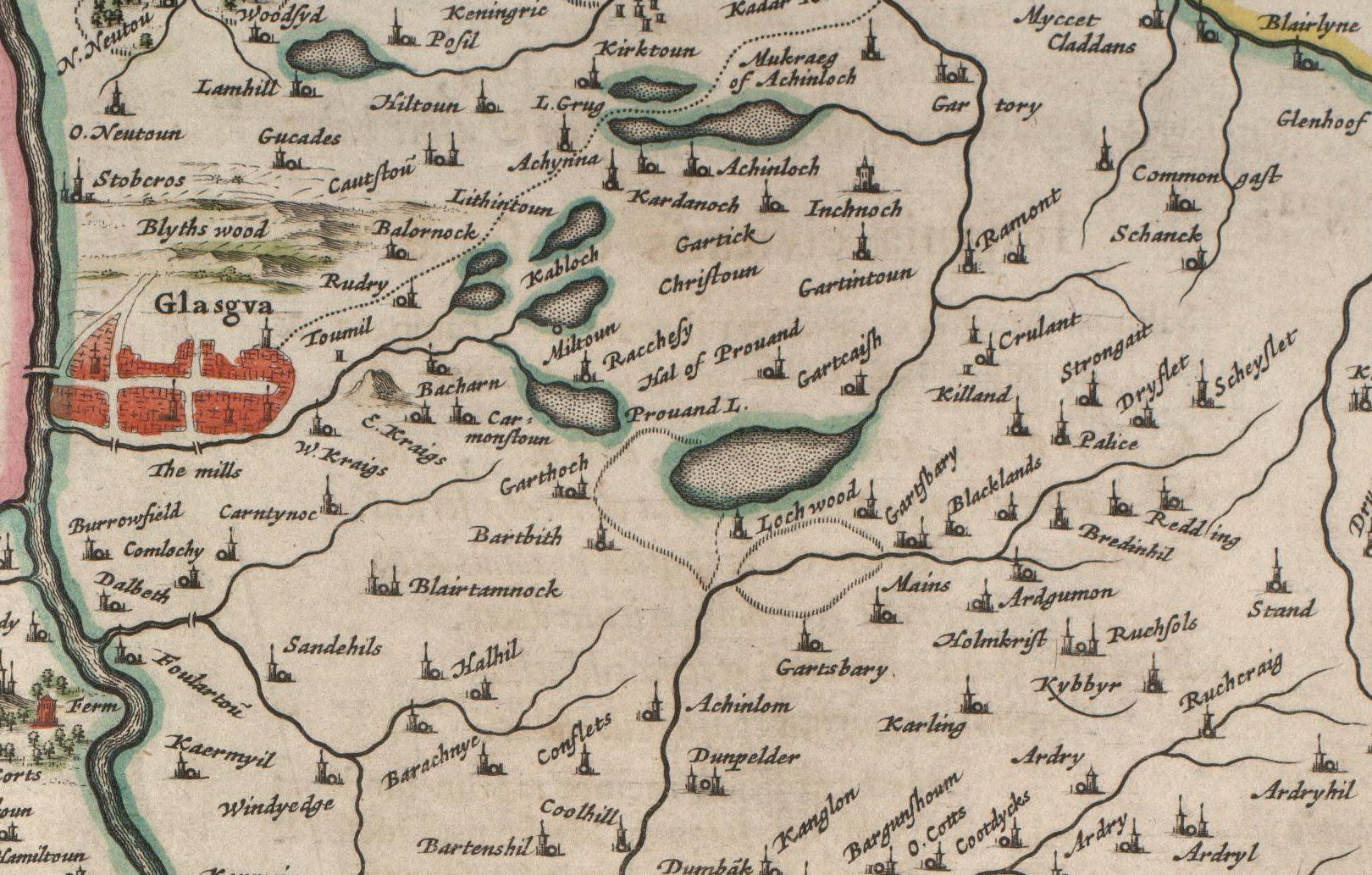
Blaeu - Atlas of Scotland 1654 around Gartcosh

The etymology of the name is "loch enclosure". Several old documents show Gartloch with various spellings including on maps by Timothy Pont, Charles Ross, and William Roy. Between 1897 and 1921, Garnkirk was the location of the Gartloch Distillery that produced grain whisky.
