= Our Lady's High School, Cumbernauld =

Coordinates: 55°56′39″N 4°0′7″W

Our Lady's High School

Location
- Dowanfield Road, Ravenswood; Cumbernauld, North Lanarkshire; Scotland

Information
- Type: Secondary
- Established: 1968
- Head teacher: Nicola Cunningham
- Grades: Scottish Qualifications Certificate; National 5 Higher; Advanced Higher
- Nickname: OLHS
- Affiliations: St Mary's Primary, St Joseph's Primary, St Lucy's Primary School
- Website: http://www.ourladys.n-lanark.sch.uk/

Our Lady's High School is a six-year Roman Catholic co-educational comprehensive school which opened in Ravenswood in 1968. It caters for pupils living in Cumbernauld, Muirhead, Cardowan and Stepps and in addition to pupils from Condorrat, Dullatur, Moodiesburn and Castlecary. The school's emblem is a post-modern artistic recreation of the Virgin and child.

== History ==
Prior to its opening in 1968 there was no Roman Catholic high school in Cumbernauld and pupils had to make a 10-mile bus journey to Kirkintilloch to attend St Ninian's.

The school has always maintained a strong link with the surrounding community, and through pupils, parents and teacher links they are associated with several primary schools from which the intake is drawn:

- St Margaret of Scotland Primary School, Cumbernauld
- St Lucy's Primary School, Abronhill
- St Mary's Primary School, Ravenswood
- St Joseph's Primary School, Stepps
- St Barbara's Primary School, Muirhead
- St Andrew's Primary School, Cumbernauld

The former Sacred Heart Primary in Kildrum was also a feeder primary until its closure in 2000. Like Sacred Heart, Our Lady's was architecturally designed by Gillespie, Kidd & Coia.

== Houses ==
The pupils are split into five Houses: St Pope John Paul II, St Mother Teresa, St Sebastian, St Francis, and St Patrick.

== Notable former pupils ==
- Mark McGhee (b. 1957) – football manager
- Peter Mackie (b. 1958) – football player, Celtic F.C. and St Mirren F.C.
- Pauline McNeill (b. 1962) – Member of the Scottish Parliament
- David Cromwell (b. 1962) – oceanographer and co-editor of the Media Lens website
- Neil Primrose (b. 1972) – drummer from Travis
- Lynn McCafferty (b. 1979) - handball player
- Michael M (b. unknown) - musician
- Michael Guitar (b. unknown) - musician
- Michael Drum (b. unknown) - musician
