= Millerston =

Coordinates: 55.886077°N 4.164730°W

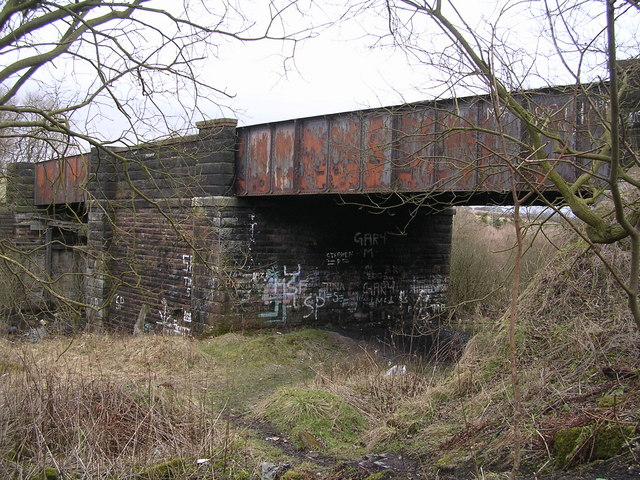
- Disused railway bridge, Bogside Road

- Location within Glasgow
- OS grid reference: NS647680
- Council area: Glasgow City Council
- Lieutenancy area: Glasgow
- Country: Scotland
- Sovereign state: United Kingdom
- Post town: GLASGOW
- Postcode district: G33
- Dialling code: 0141
- Police: Scotland
- Fire: Scottish
- Ambulance: Scottish
- UK Parliament: Glasgow North East; Coatbridge, Chryston and Bellshill
- Scottish Parliament: Glasgow Provan; Coatbridge and Chryston

Millerston is a district partially in the Scottish city of Glasgow and partially in North Lanarkshire. It is situated north of the River Clyde, to the north of the city's Craigend, Garthamlock and Ruchazie neighbourhoods, but physically separated from them by parkland and wooded areas. It is also home to the playing fields of Glasgow's St Aloysius College and Strathclyde University.

Whilst part of Millerston belongs to Glasgow City Council, the other part is served by North Lanarkshire Council. The official Millerston boundary starts at Hogganfield Loch stretching all the way down Cumbernauld Road as far as Laundry Lane but in recent times, the area has been incorporated into the larger town of Stepps which is entirely within North Lanarkshire.

Millerston enjoys a convenient location due to its close proximity to Glasgow City Centre and has been identified as one of the growth areas for Glasgow City Council. A train station (at Robroyston, with a new road connecting Millerston to the suburb of that name - they were previously separated by fields) is in the pipeline as are many new homes and businesses. The area has countryside on the doorstep along with many pleasant places to walk locally such as Hogganfield Park.

Millerston sits between the M8 and M80 motorway networks, making it popular for commuting throughout the Central Belt. The new railway station approach road will also allow access to Junction 2 of the M80, a quicker connection for local residents who currently must travel through Stepps to Junction 3; however, this may also increase traffic in the area. There are two public houses in Millerston, The Dug and Duck and The Real MacKay. The district is also home to a fish and chip shop, a curry house, a Chinese take-away, a convenience store, a post office and a small church, Millerston United Free Church of Scotland.
