= Garnkirk =

Coordinates: 55.893°N 4.115°W

Garnkirk: Scottish Gaelic: Gart nan Cearc
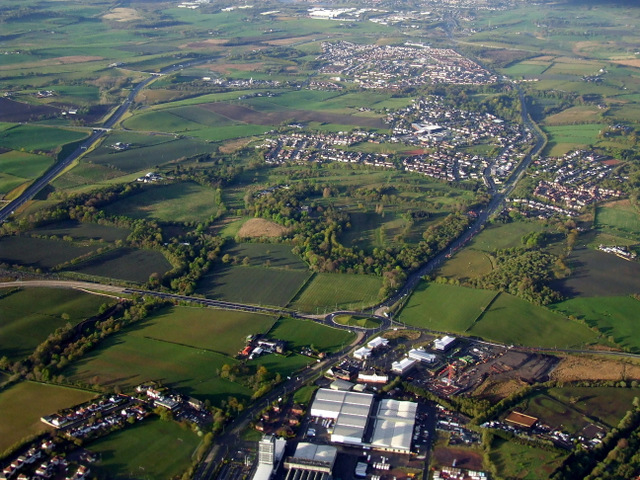
- site of Garnkirk Burn and Garnkirk House

- Location within Scotland Garnkirk (Scotland)
- Lieutenancy area: Lanarkshire
- Country: Scotland
- Sovereign state: United Kingdom
- Post town: GLASGOW
- Postcode district: G69
- Police: Scotland
- Fire: Scottish
- Ambulance: Scottish
- UK Parliament: Coatbridge, Chryston and Bellshill
- Scottish Parliament: Coatbridge and Chryston

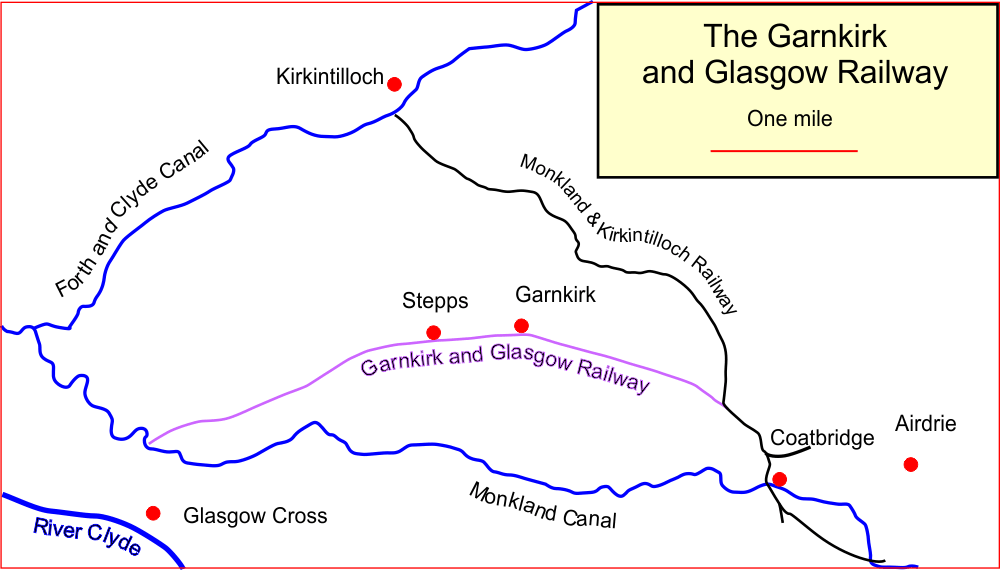
Garnkirk and Glasgow Railway

Garnkirk is a settlement in North Lanarkshire, located a mile (1.5 km) southwest of Muirhead. It is located 10 km northeast of Glasgow's city centre and 23 km southwest of Falkirk. Garnkirk is connected via the nearby motorways M8, M73 and M80. This provides access to Cumbernauld, Glasgow and Stirling. The nearest modern railway stations are in Gartcosh and Stepps.

== History ==
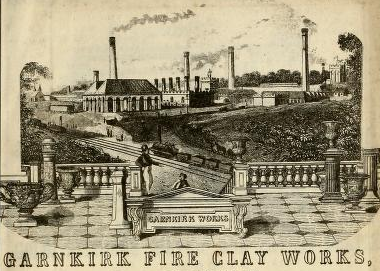
Garnkirk Fire Clay Works

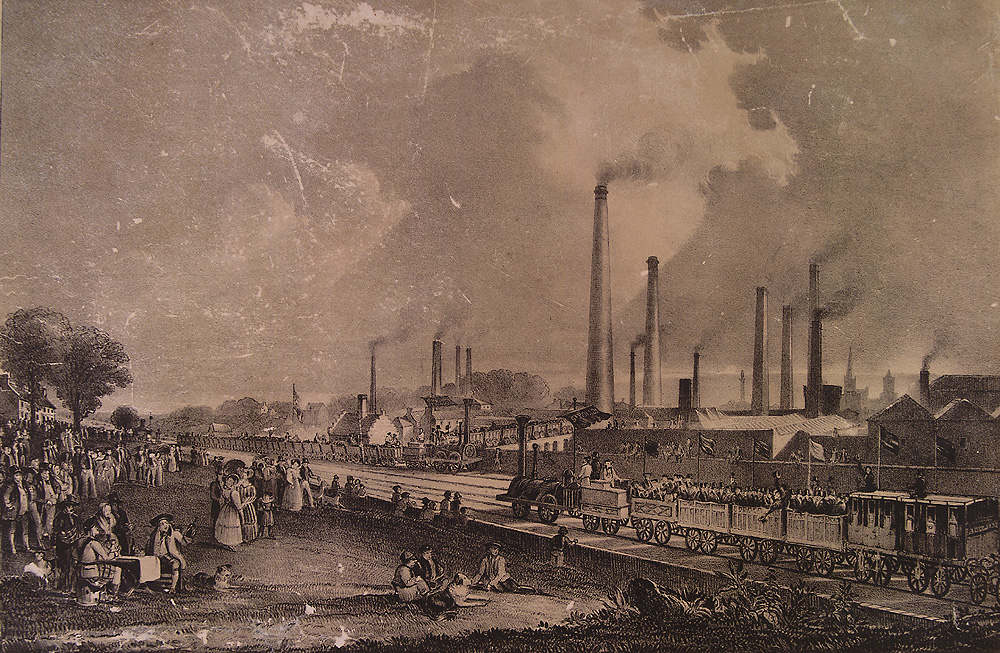
One of a series of paintings and engravings titled "The Opening of the Garnkirk and Glasgow Railway" by David Octavius Hill

The etymology of the name is ‘enclosure of the hen’. Several old documents show Garnkirk with various spellings including maps by Timothy Pont, Charles Ross, and William Roy.

John Dunlop bought Garnkirk House in 1634. The house stayed in the family for many years. The Dunlops were well known. For example James Dunlop being a wealthy landowner opposed Thomas Muir and the congregation at Cadder over who appointed their minister. The house is now the clubhouse of the Crow Wood Golf Club.

"James Dunlop of Garnkirk" was one of the five wealthy supporters of Glasgow's first playhouse in the late 18th century ( a Puritanical spirit suppressing entertainment in the city).

One gazetteer, Samuel Lewis, describes coal being hardly worth digging Auchinloch with some limestone quarrying with a works established at Garnkirk. There was some coal found at Garnkirk. There was a substantial fire clay works at Garnkirk, north of Garnkirk Station, on the Garnkirk and Glasgow Railway. It opened around 1831; their goods were sold around the world. The works manufactured products including vases, flower-pots and crucibles. It shut in 1901. Between 1897 and 1921 Garnkirk was the location of the Gartloch Distillery that produced grain whisky. It was sold as widely as America and New Zealand.

== Garnkirk Burn ==
The Garnkirk Burn rises to the west of Stepps. It then runs through the Garnkirk Glen and flows north-east to meet the Bothlin Burn. The Bothlin Burn escapes from Bishop Loch, south of Gartcosh. It is joined by the Garnkirk Burn east of Davidston farm, just north of the M80. The Bothlin is without a doubt the Luggie Water's major contributing stream.

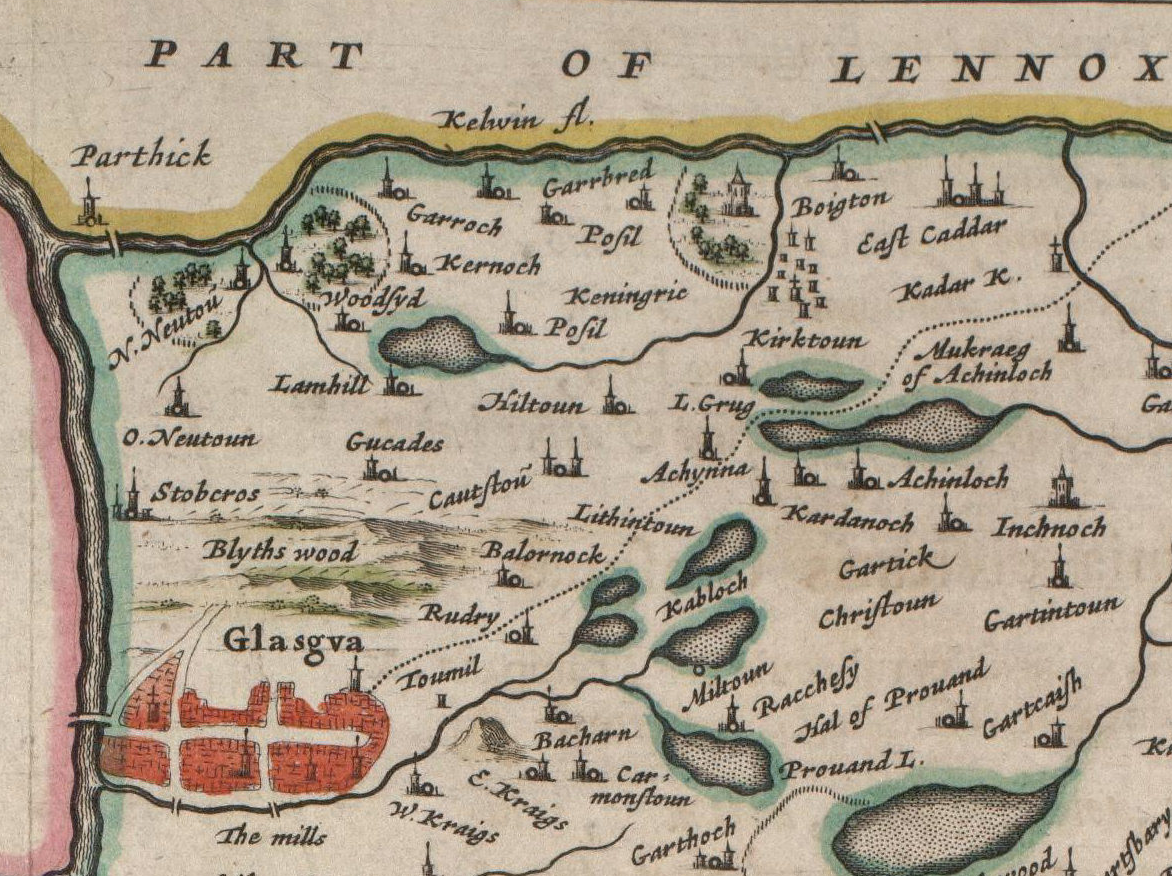
Blaeu - Atlas of Scotland 1654 - GLOTTIANA PRÆFECTVRA INFERIOR - Lower Clydesdale showing Garnkirk as Gartick

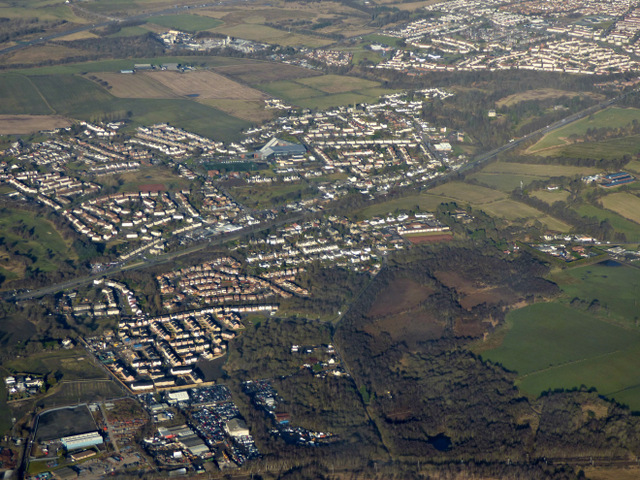
Muirhead, Chryston and Moodiesburn from the air. Garnkirk was on the railway line at the bottom of the picture.
