= Muirhead, North Lanarkshire =

Town in North Lanarkshire, Scotland

Coordinates: 55.898°N 4.106°W

Muirhead: Scottish Gaelic: Ceann a' Mhonaidh; Scots: Mairheid
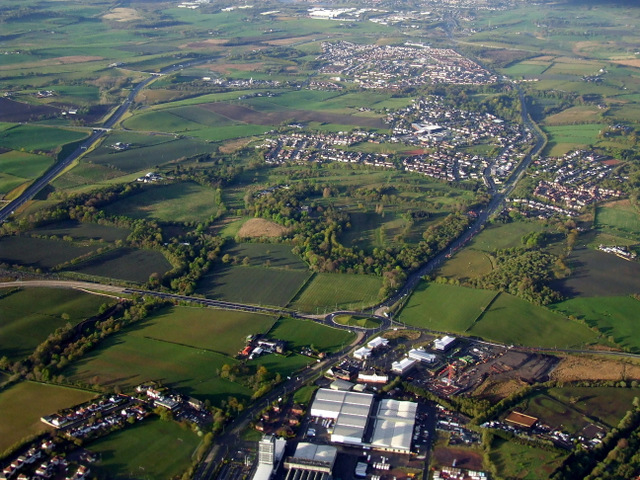
- Muirhead from the air

- Location within North Lanarkshire Muirhead (North Lanarkshire)
- Population: 1,830 (2020)
- OS grid reference: NS 684 692
- Council area: North Lanarkshire
- Lieutenancy area: Lanarkshire
- Country: Scotland
- Sovereign state: United Kingdom
- Post town: GLASGOW
- Postcode district: G69 9
- Dialling code: 01236
- Police: Scotland
- Fire: Scottish
- Ambulance: Scottish
- UK Parliament: Cumbernauld and Kirkintilloch
- Scottish Parliament: Coatbridge and Chryston

Muirhead is a small town approximately 7 miles (11 km) north-east of Glasgow city centre. Nearby villages and towns include Chryston, Garnkirk, Gartcosh, Moodiesburn, Lenzie and Stepps. Muirhead has a population of around 1,390. It is a commuter town to Glasgow with road links with the A80/M80 and frequent bus services the X3 and 38C. Muirhead is located approximately two miles from Gartcosh, Lenzie and Stepps railway stations.

== History ==
The name may be related to the nearby Muirside. Some old documents show Muirhead with various spellings including maps by for example William Forrest.

Muirhead was little more than a hamlet before a new road was built just south of Chryston at the end of the 18th century. Muirhead was formerly in the parish of Cadder. Industries connected with Muirhead include coal and fire clay mining, brickmaking and distilling. The New Statistical Account of 1845 reported 40 persons in 9 families at Muirhead. Growth in the village followed the opening of The Garnkirk and Glasgow Railway in 1831. Following the First World War a cenotaph was built in 1923 at Muirhead. A primary school, St. Barbara's on Elmira Road, was opened in August 1933.

== Current village ==
The suburb has a variety of shops including a Co-operative Food, newsagents, award-winning butcher, stationers and plenty of take-away food shops. Two bars which serve the area are the Muirhead Inn and The Crowwood. A local development to the south of the village is Belhaven Park. The surrounding area has one high school and two primary schools.

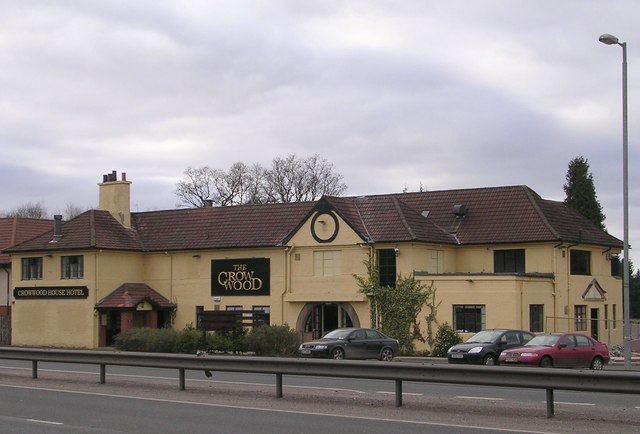
The Crow Wood House Hotel

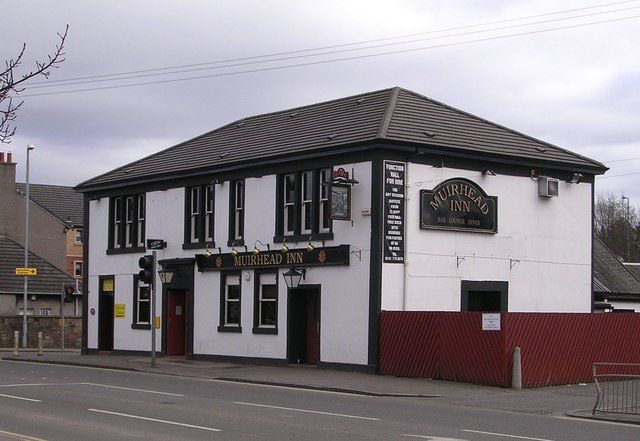
The Muirhead Inn

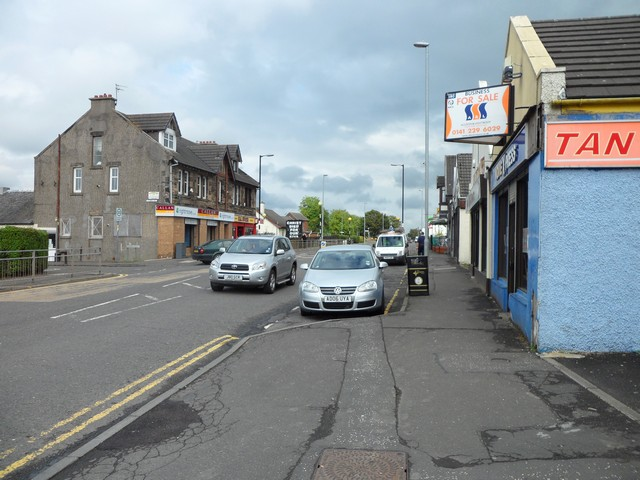
The Main Street in Muirhead

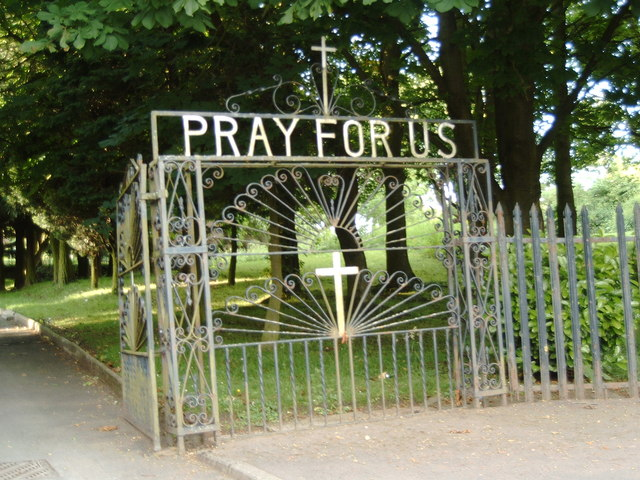
Entrance to St. Barbara's
