= Felix Reilly =

Scottish footballer

Personal information
- Full name: Felix McCairney Reilly
- Date of birth: 12 September 1933
- Place of birth: Annathill, Scotland
- Date of death: 2 January 2018 (aged 84)
- Place of death: Comrie, Scotland
- Position: Forward

Youth career
- Shotts Bon Accord

Senior career*
Years	Team	Apps	(Gls)
1953–1957	Dunfermline Athletic	88	(22)
1957–1958	Dundee	5	(0)
1958–1960	East Fife	40	(15)
1960–1961	Bradford Park Avenue	31	(12)
1961–1962	Crewe Alexandra	6	(0)
- Altrincham
Total		170	(49)

International career
1957	Scotland U23	1	(0)
- * Club domestic league appearances and goals

Felix McCairney Reilly (12 September 1933 – 2 January 2018) was a Scottish professional footballer, who played as a forward.

== Career ==
Born in Annathill, Reilly played for Shotts Bon Accord, Dunfermline Athletic, Dundee, East Fife, Bradford Park Avenue, Crewe Alexandra and Altrincham.

== Death ==
Reilly died on 2 January 2018 at his home in Comrie, Perthshire.
