= Glenboig =

Coordinates: 55.8933°N 4.0449°W

Glenboig: Scottish Gaelic: An Gleann Bhog
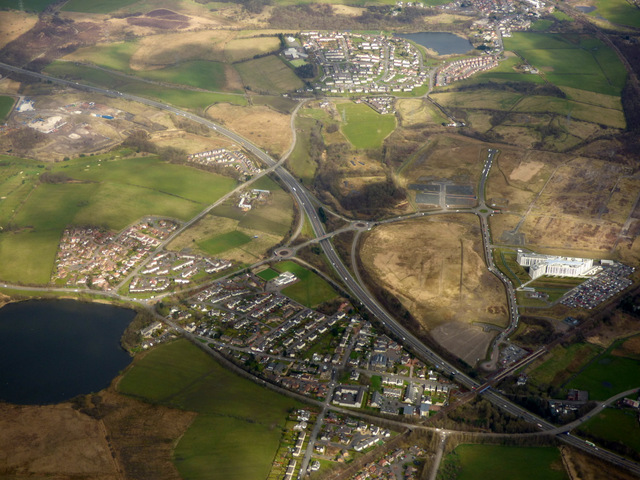
- The M73 with Gartcosh in the foreground and Glenboig and Garnqueen Loch in the background

- Location within North Lanarkshire
- Population: 2,990 (2020)
- Council area: North Lanarkshire
- Country: Scotland
- Sovereign state: United Kingdom
- Post town: COATBRIDGE
- Postcode district: ML5 2
- Police: Scotland
- Fire: Scottish
- Ambulance: Scottish

Glenboig (Scottish Gaelic: An Gleann Bhog) is a village in North Lanarkshire, Scotland lying north of Coatbridge and to the south east of Kirkintilloch and is approximately ten miles (sixteen kilometres) from Glasgow City Centre. According to a 2020 estimate, the population of Glenboig was 2,990.

Historically the settlement formed the south eastern extremity of the ancient Gaelic province of the Lennox (Scottish Gaelic: An Leamhnachd) which lay roughly within the former county of Dunbartonshire. The etymology of the name is uncertain but may mean "boggy or soft glen". Some online maps refer to the area as Marnock but locals call the area Glenboig.

Glenboig's main industry was fireclay and Glenboig's name was known across the world.

== History ==
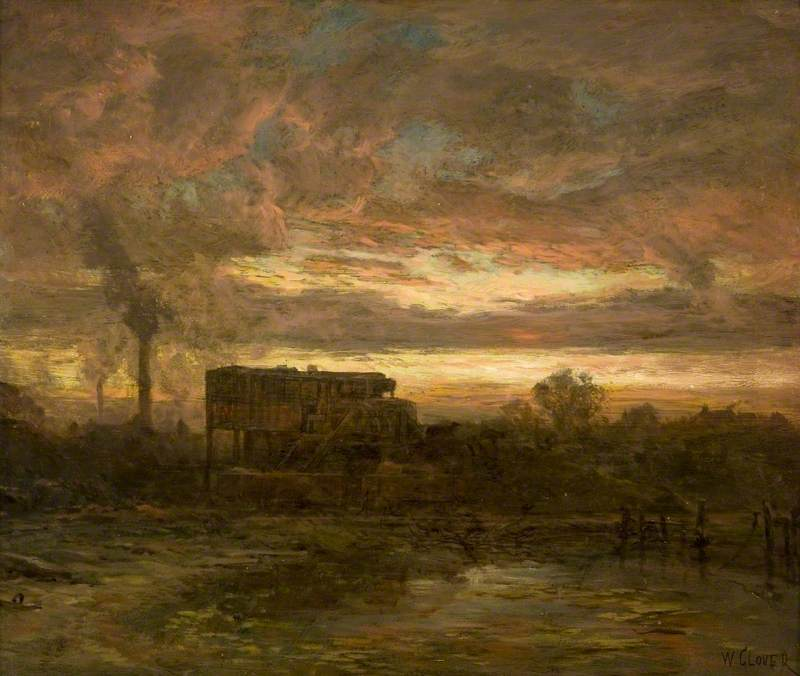
Glenboig Clay Mill (oil on millboard) by William Glover (1836–1916)

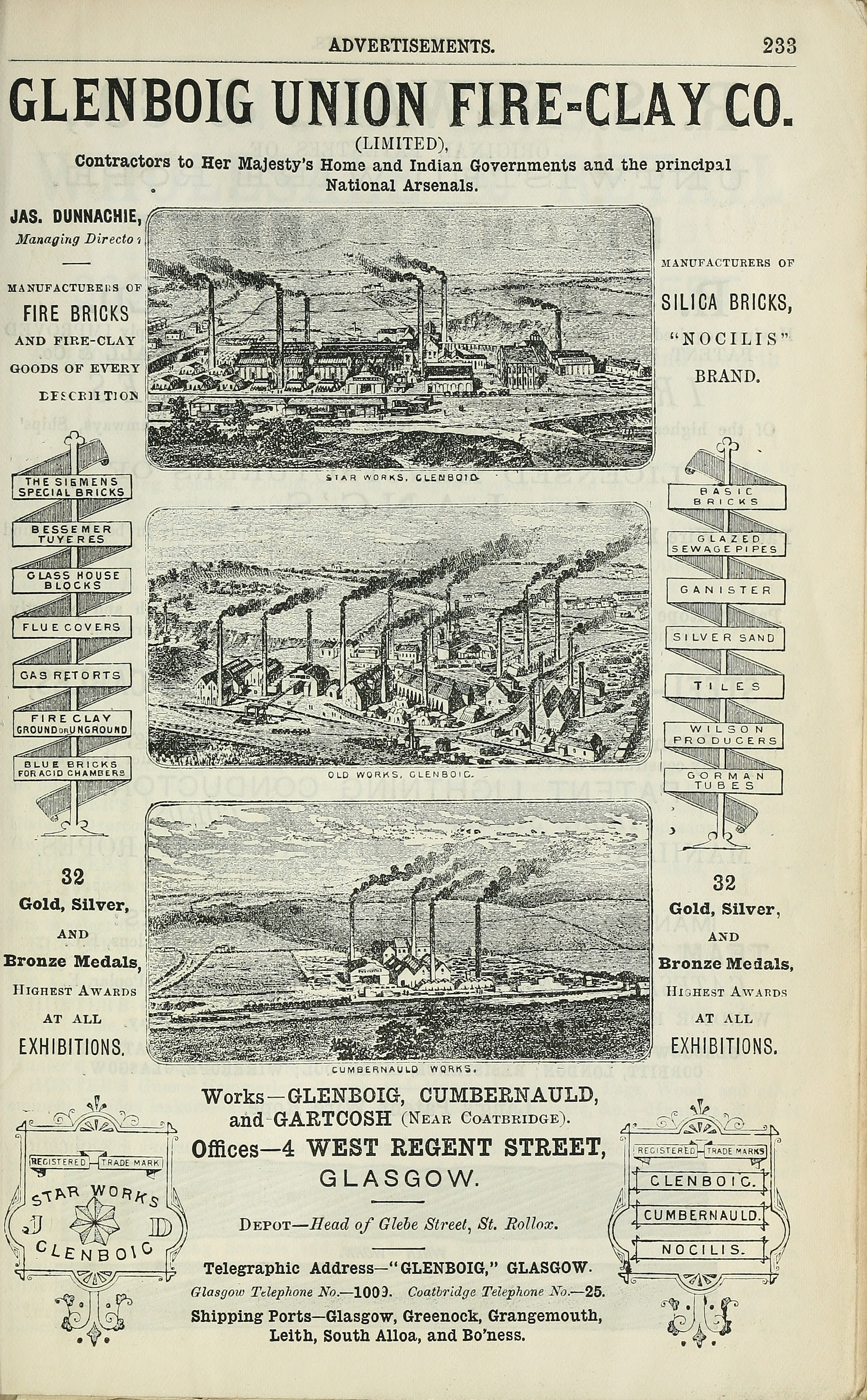
Advertisement with pictures of the Star Works and the Old Works at Glenboig with the Cumbernauld Works below

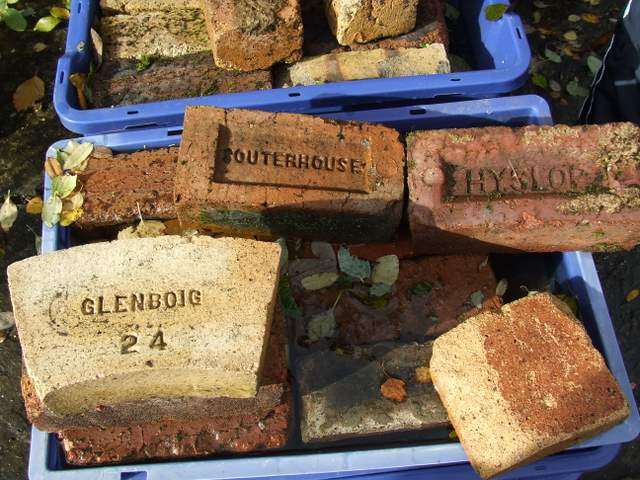
A Glenboig brick

Glenboig's main industry was fireclay, centred on the General Refractories and Glenboig Union Fireclay Company Limited's Star Fireclay Works, which made refractory products for the steel and iron industries. Aerial photographs of the works are available. The Glenboig Union Fire-clay Company Limited dates back to 1836.

Glenboig's only railway station closed in 1956. The closest is now Gartcosh. Glenboig's brick making industries ceased after the closure of the last brickworks, P&M (Peter & Mark) Hurll's in July 1980.

The village's first school was built between 1875 and 1876; it has since been replaced.

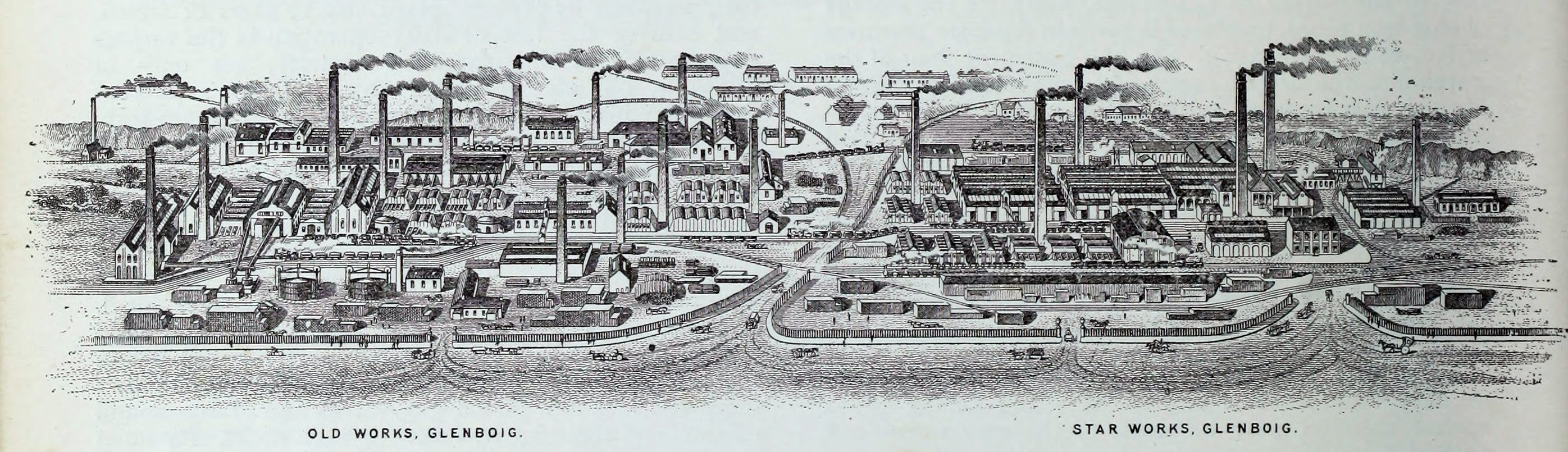
Glenboig fire-clay works

== Bedlay Colliery (1905–1981) ==
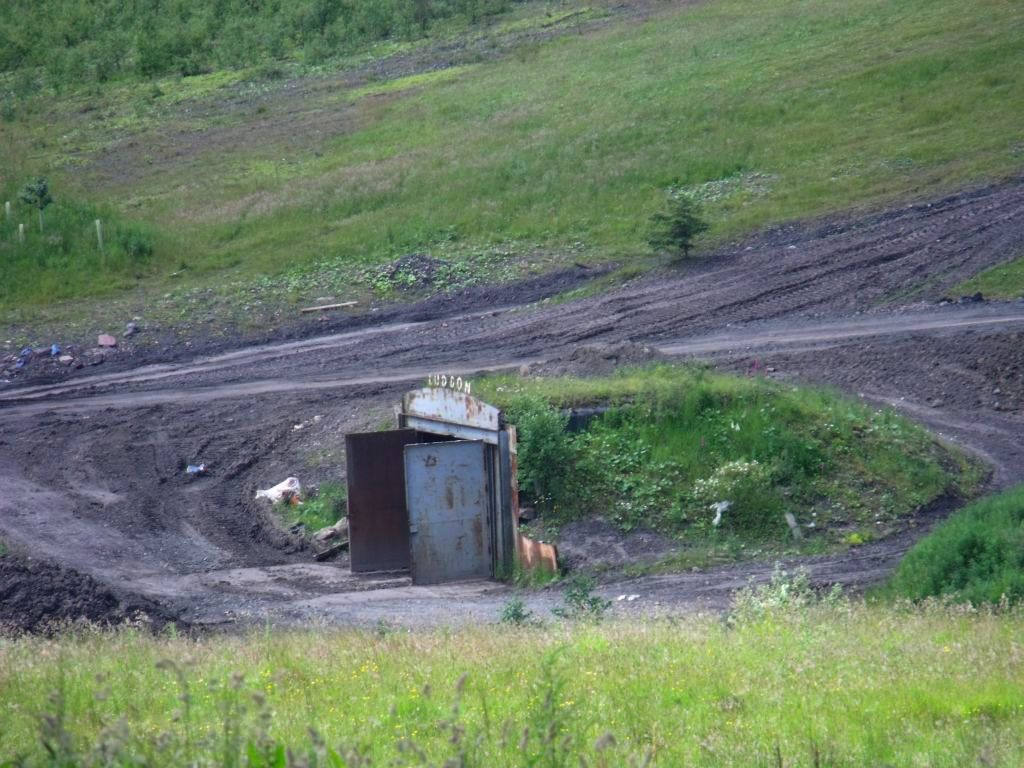
Annathill, underground workshop

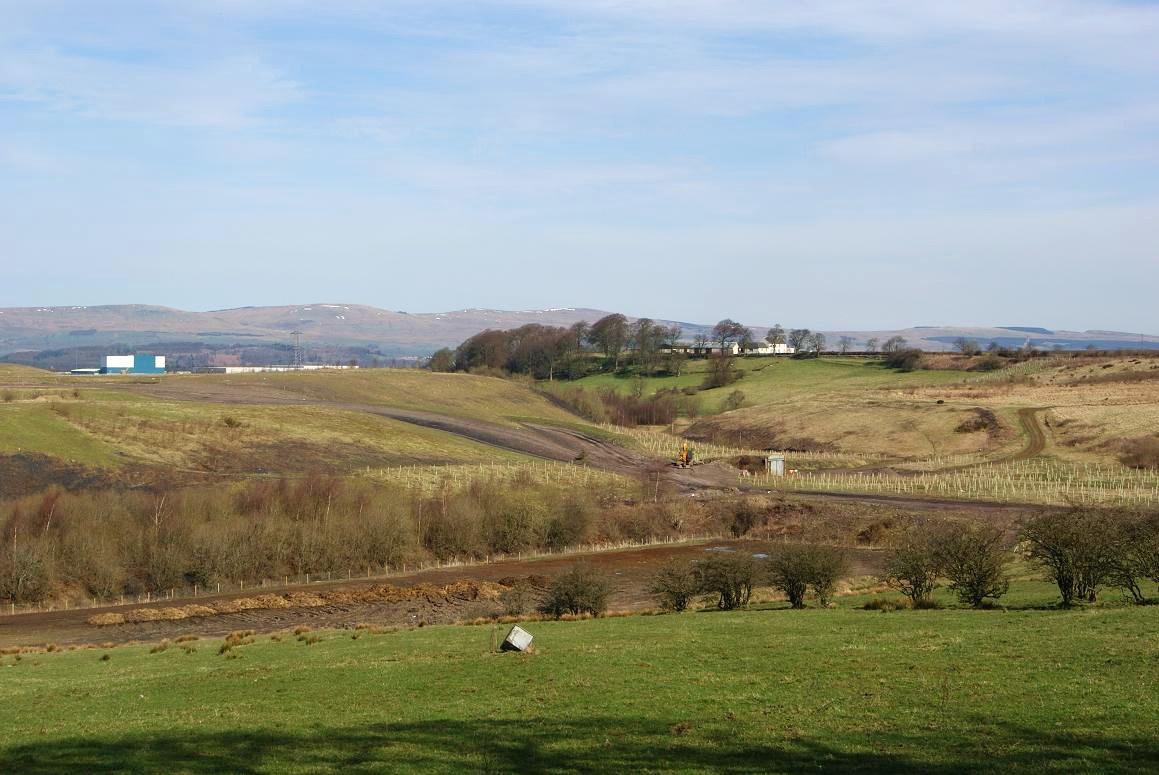
Bedlay Colliery landscape restoration project

Bedlay was a two shaft coal "pit"; one shaft had modern enclosed headgear while the other was of an older type. It was opened in 1905. On 11 December 1981, Bedlay Colliery in the nearby village of Annathill was closed.

In 2009 Glenboig Village Park was completely rebuilt after several million pounds of funding from The National Lottery dramatically increasing its size and including state of the art equipment.

== Demographics ==
Historic population of Glenboig
Year	Population
1871	307
1881	934
1891	1,360 (19th century statistics include Garnqueen)
1991	1,743
2001	1,837
2011	2,681

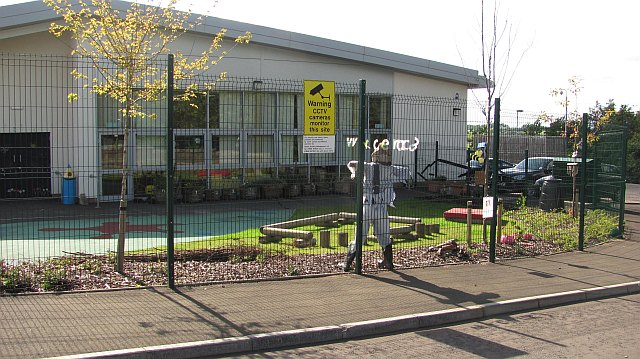
Glenboig primary schools

Historically the name of the settlement has changed. Before the brickworks the settlement was Garnqueen.

== Glenboig today ==
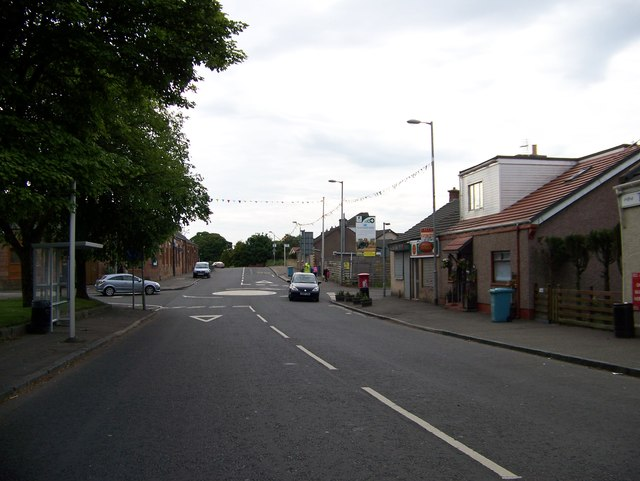
Glenboig, with the post office on the right

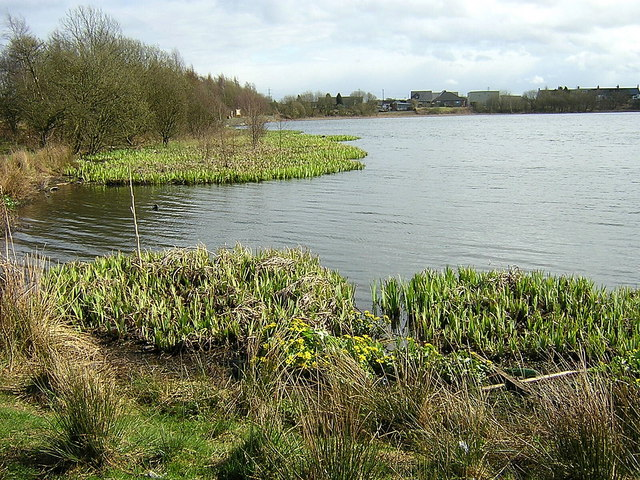
Garnqueen Loch

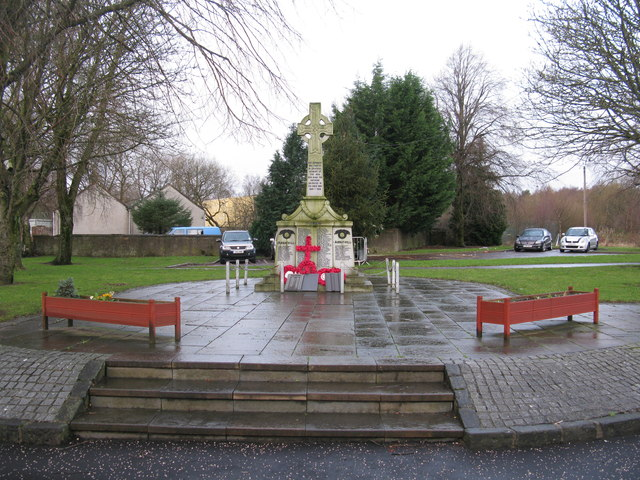
Glenboig War Memorial

In recent years the village has grown, with the addition of two new Redrow and Barrat housing estates in the early to mid part of the 2000s.

In 2015, a new road was authorised between Glenboig and Gartcosh on the other side of the M73 motorway, as part of a 'community growth area' expansion involving new business units (alongside the existing Police Scotland Scottish Crime Campus facility) and 3000 houses across the development zone, also encompassing land near the village of Mount Ellen north of Gartcosh.

In 2021, work begun on a new housing development site called Meadowside.

Within the community there are many small businesses including a flower arrangers, architectural design service and mortgage brokers and professional tree surgeons. Glenboig also has a post office, hair salon, beauty salon, newsagents, retail and food options.

== In popular culture ==
- Glenboig Clayworks (1935) B&W 7 mins silent by Alexander McKendrik, shows clay being mined and firebricks being moulded
- Coronation Celebrations at Glenboig (1953) colour seven mins silent by Alexander McKendrik

== See also ==
- List of places in North Lanarkshire
- List of places in Scotland
