= GRH =

GRH may refer to:

- Gartcosh railway station, in Scotland
- Gbiri-Niragu language
- Generalized Riemann hypothesis
- Gonadotropin-releasing hormone
- Gramm-Rudman-Hollings Balanced Budget Act
