= Stirling services =

Motorway service station in Scotland

Stirling Services
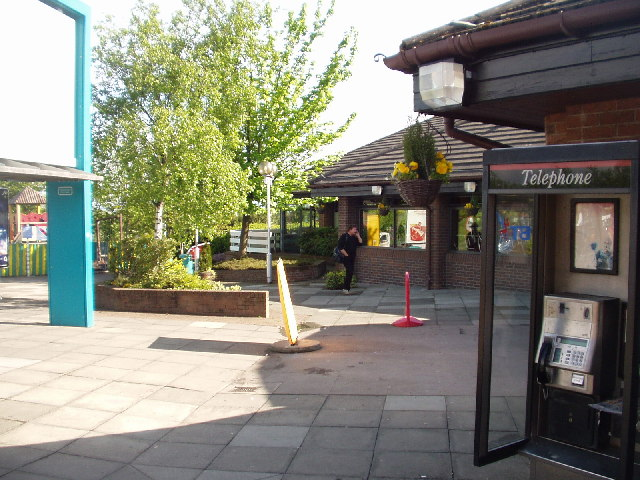

- Location within Stirling

Information
- Road: M9 and M80
- Coordinates: 56.0762°N 3.9216°W
- Operator: Moto Hospitality
- Date opened: 1986
- Website: moto-way.com/services/stirling/

Stirling services is a motorway service station near Stirling, Scotland. The service station is located where the M9 motorway and M80 motorway join. It is owned by Moto.

== History ==
There used to a property here called Snabhead, which was cut off by the motorways and served by a new, long driveway from the Bannockburn Roundabout. That property closed in the late 1970s, and its exit went on to be used by the new services.

With only three small services open in Scotland before Stirling, and all of them struggling, informal discussions with prospective developers were held to assess the demand and agree on what should be built at Stirling.

Following approval from the government, the Granada Lodge here was the first on a motorway. In 1994 there was a plan to build a factory outlet centre here, but it was refused. The Granada Lodge became a Travelodge in 1996.

The small building had its entrance on the right (the far end compared to where it is now). This had a large restaurant area on the left, a shop straight ahead and toilets on the right. The area at the front was supposed to be a landscaped courtyard.

In 1997, the restaurant area was extended to include a Burger King. It also experienced a number of changes, from Country Kitchen to Fresh Express and Caffe Ritazza and then to EDC and Costa.

In 2012, a major refurbishment introduced a new entrance at the far end of the building, replacing the outdoor seating area. This created a new corridor running through the middle of the old restaurant - a common tactic in new service area design. The old entrance was boarded up. The main restaurant eventually closed, making space for an M&S.

A tourist information centre had been built by the hotel. This lasted remarkably long, until at least 2017, but it was eventually closed and became Greggs.

As of 2020, there is a plan to build a Changing Places toilet here.
