= M876 motorway =

Motorway in Scotland

M876
- M876 highlighted in blue

Route information
- Length: 8.0 mi (12.9 km)
- Existed: 1980–present

Major junctions
- Northeast end: Dennyloanhead
- M80 motorway Junction 8 M9 motorway Junctions 7 and 8
- Southwest end: Bowtrees near Kincardine Bridge

Location
- Country: United Kingdom
- Primary destinations: Kincardine Bridge, Falkirk

Road network
- Roads in the United Kingdom; Motorways; A and B road zones
← M621	→ M898

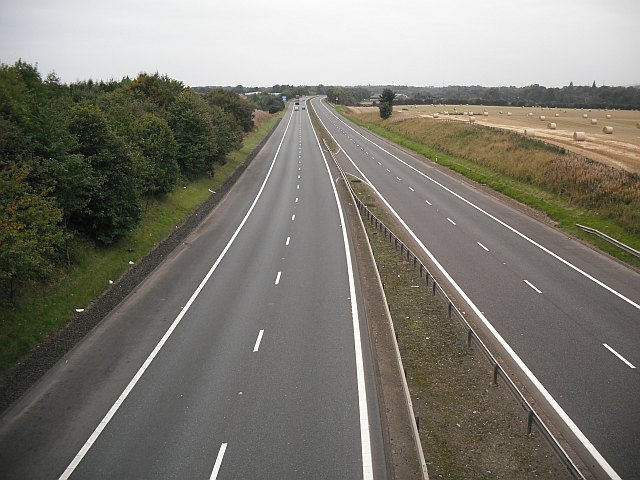
The M876 motorway near to Stenhousemuir

The M876 motorway is a motorway in Scotland. The motorway runs from Denny to Airth in the Falkirk council area, forming an approach road to the Kincardine Bridge. It was opened in 1980.

The road is 8 miles (13 km) long. It begins by turning off junction 8 (formerly junction 5 until 2011) of the M80 and bypasses Falkirk and Stenhousemuir. It is one of only three motorways in the UK which form a concurrency with another motorway, the M9, which it then leaves again and continues for 1 mile (1.6 km) before becoming the A876.

The original Kincardine Bridge was supplemented in 2008 by a second bridge, the Clackmannanshire Bridge, for traffic towards Alloa. As part of the works, the terminal Bowtrees Roundabout was replaced with a grade separated junction, and the A876 beyond the junction was upgraded to dual carriageway standard.

== Junctions ==
M876 motorway junctions
County	Location	mi	km	Junction	Destinations	Notes
Falkirk	Denny	0	0	— (Note: 56.0006°N 3.9204°W)	M80 - Glasgow, Cumbernauld	Eastbound entrance and Westbound exit only
Falkirk	Denny	2.0	3.2	1 (Note: 56.0134°N 3.8764°W)	A883 - Denny, Falkirk	
Falkirk	Falkirk	3.6	5.9	2 (Note: 56.0326°N 3.8502°W)	A9 - Falkirk, Larbert;	
Falkirk	5.3	8.5	— (Note: 56.0432°N 3.8133°W)	M9 - Stirling	Eastbound entrance and Westbound exit only, begins multiplex with M9	
Falkirk		6.2	10.0	— (Note: 56.0433°N 3.7831°W)	M9 - Grangemouth, Falkirk	End of multiplex with M9
Falkirk		7.6	12.1	3 (Note: 56.0524°N 3.7595°W)	A905 - Airth; A876 - Kincardine	End of motorway; continues as A876
1.000 mi = 1.609 km; 1.000 km = 0.621 mi: Concurrency terminus; Incomplete access

Coordinate list

== See also ==
- List of motorways in the United Kingdom
