= Gartcosh =

Coordinates: 55.887°N 4.084°W

Gartcosh: Scottish Gaelic: Gart Cois
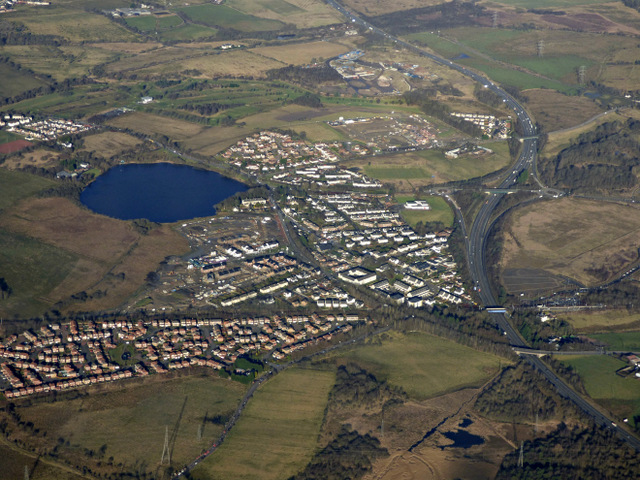
- Gartcosh from the air (2018)

- Location within North Lanarkshire Gartcosh (North Lanarkshire)
- Population: 2,920 (2020)
- Council area: North Lanarkshire
- Lieutenancy area: Lanarkshire
- Country: Scotland
- Sovereign state: United Kingdom
- Post town: GLASGOW
- Postcode district: G69
- Police: Scotland
- Fire: Scottish
- Ambulance: Scottish
- UK Parliament: Coatbridge, Chryston and Bellshill
- Scottish Parliament: Coatbridge and Chryston

Gartcosh (Scottish Gaelic: Gart Cois) is a village in North Lanarkshire, Scotland. The village lies about 8 miles (13 kilometres) east of Glasgow, and about 1 mile (2 kilometres) northwest of the town of Coatbridge.

According to a 2012 estimate, the population of Gartcosh was 2,130 people. Expansion of the village including 300 homes in the Heathfield Park estate built by Redrow Homes and new developments by Oak NGate (Gartloch Avenue/Bishop Loch), Avant Homes (Johnston Loch) and Bellway Homes (Oakwood) have increased the population.

== History ==
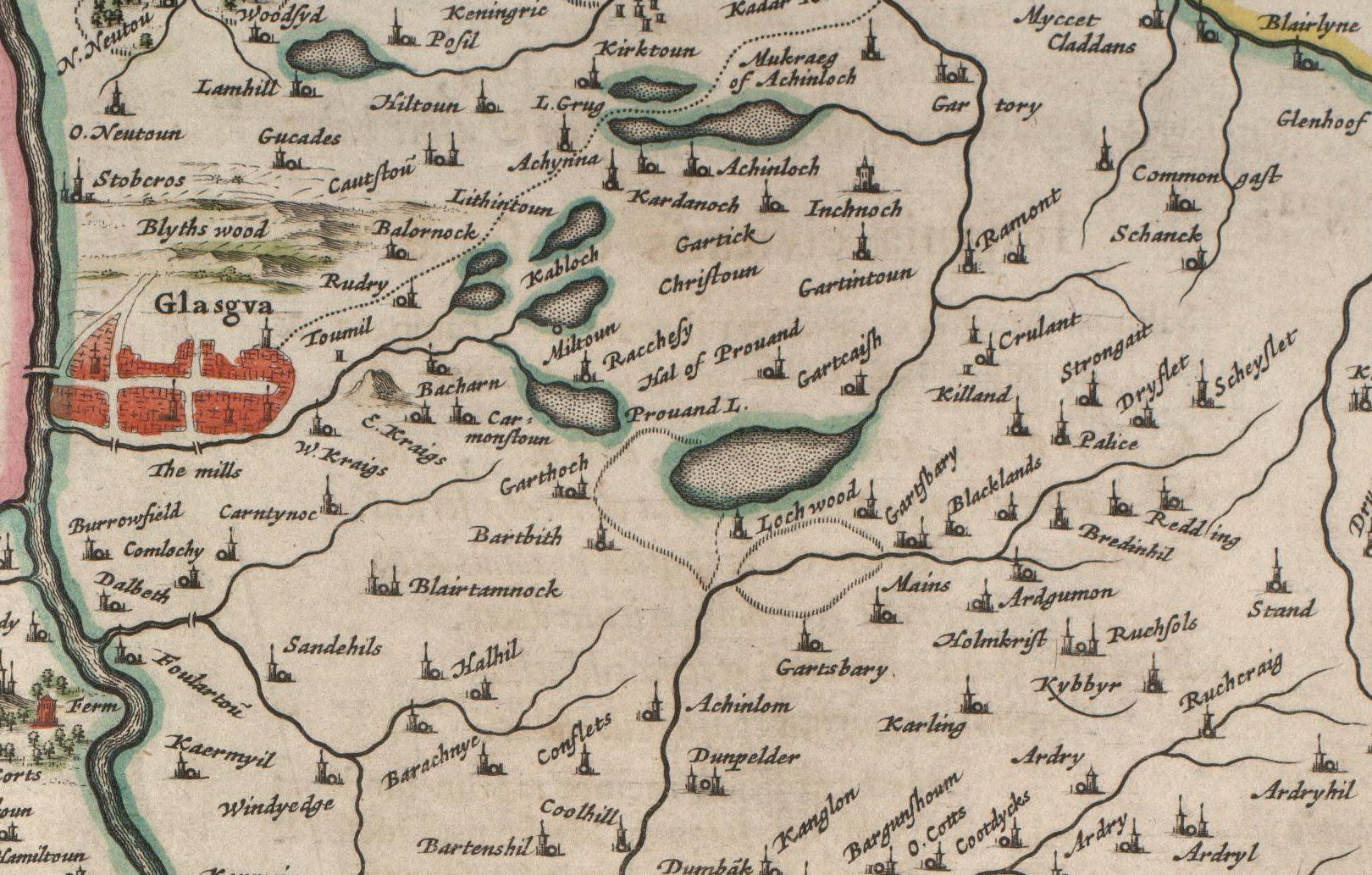
Blaeu's map based on Pont's original "Glasgow and the county of Lanark" map c. 1596 depicting Gartcaiſh amongst others.

The name Gartcosh might be derived perhaps from the Gaelic gart meaning 'field' and cos meaning 'hollow'. Alternatively 'enclosure of the foot' has been suggested. Several old documents show Gartcosh (spelled Gartcash), including maps by Timothy Pont, Forrest, and William Roy.

Though originally an agricultural village, Gartcosh is better known for its role in Scottish industry. In the early 19th century there were a number of mines in the local area, and the first railway to service Gartcosh was used to transport coal to Glasgow. By 1837 there was a railway station, or to be more accurate a stopping place as there were no platforms or waiting rooms.

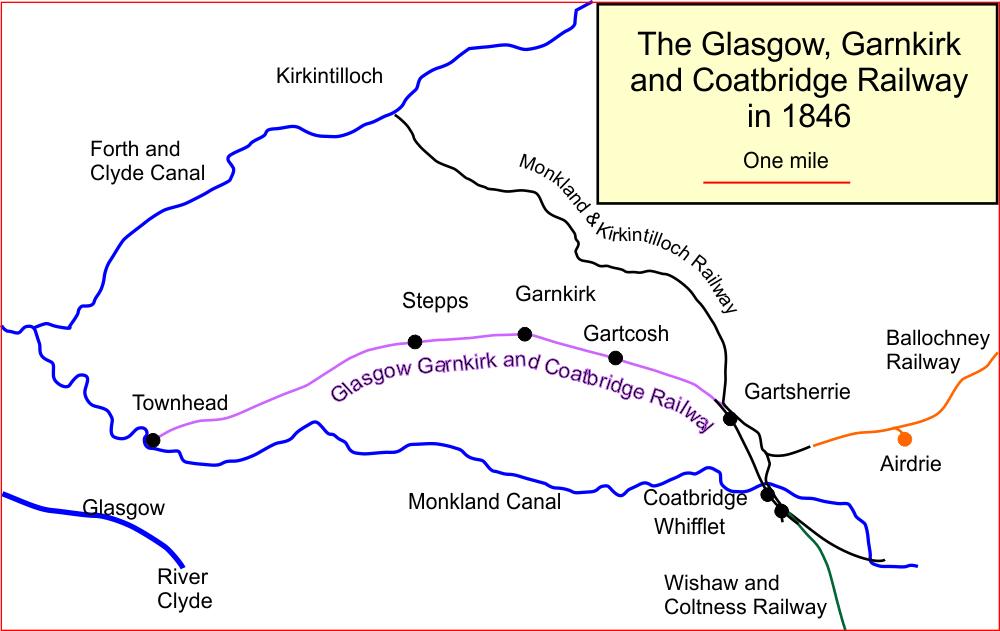
The Glasgow, Garnkirk and Coatbridge Railway 1846

From the mid-19th century onwards, Gartcosh became prominent in industry with the opening of ironworks and fire clay works.

Gartcosh Fireclay Works was established by James Binnie in 1863. Although mostly concerned with firebrick manufacture, during the early years its output was much more varied, extending to garden vases and pedestals, garden edges, fountains, chimney cans, roof tiles, cattle troughs, sewage pipes and other products. It was one of a group of such businesses in the area, with others at Cardowan, Garnkirk, Cumbernauld, Heathfield and Glenboig. The fire clay works at Garcosh at the end of the 19th century was owned by the Glenboig Union Fireclay Company Limited. Gartcosh Fireclay Works eventually closed down in the 1950s, when local supplies of fireclay were exhausted.

In 1865, Gartcosh became the home of Woodneuk Iron Works owned by William Gray & Co. It was bought by Smith & McLeans in 1872 and subsequently David Colville & Sons' steel mills. British Steel Corporation took ownership of the Colville's steel mill in Gartcosh in 1967 and operated until its closure in February 1986. The main steel mill building was demolished around 1994–95. The galvanising plant — latterly a storage shed for oversized products produced in the mill building — was used by a paper recycling company, Stirling Fibre, between October 1990 and October 2001. After this company relocated, the building was demolished in 2002.

Smith & McLeans had considerable trouble purchasing the land for the extension of the steelworks from the original land owners. Most of Gartcosh at the time was owned by two strict presbyterian spinster sisters who were unswayed by the considerable financial offerings of the company. They eventually relented, on the condition that no public house, betting shop or Catholic church would ever be housed within the Gartcosh boundaries. This agreement still holds to this day.

For this reason, a public house was built immediately outside of the natural boundary of Gartcosh, the Bothlin Burn, which runs to Glenboig. The pub, which was called Chapman's, has since closed and been replaced by housing. In the 1960s, there was a successful application for licensed premises, under the label of Gartcosh Works Social Club. There has never been a licensed bookmakers in Gartcosh. The resident Roman Catholic population travel to the neighbouring towns of Muirhead, Glenboig or Coatbridge to practise their faith.

The Co-operative store was established in the late 19th century, situated at the junction between Old Gartloch Road and Lochend Road. The store closed down, date unknown, and has had a variety of uses since then. The building, known locally as the old Co-op Building, has three flats above the shop which are now privately owned and occupied.

Gartloch Hospital was opened as in 1896. It was built on the Gartloch Estate which had been bought by the Glasgow City Council for nearly £8,600. It was then handed over to the Glasgow District Lunacy Board as a site for an asylum for the poor people of Glasgow.

== Present day ==
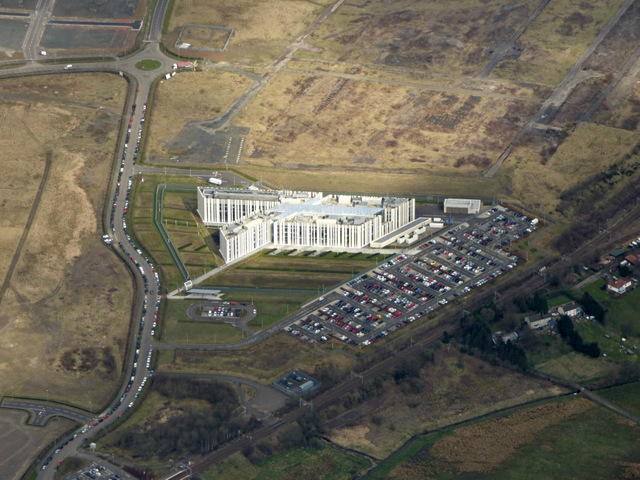
Scottish Crime Campus Gartcosh from the air

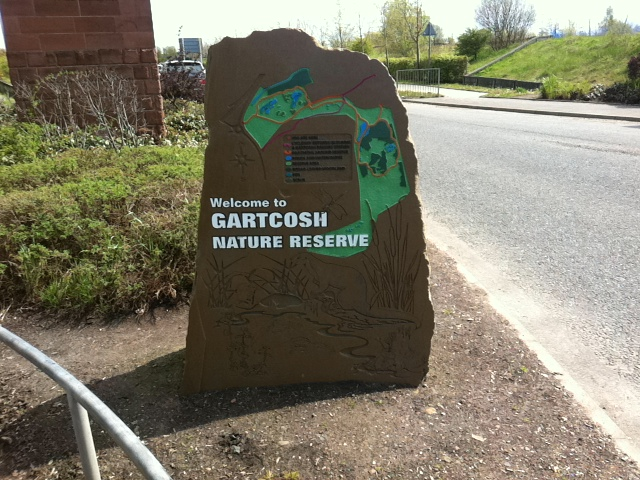
Gartcosh Nature Reserve

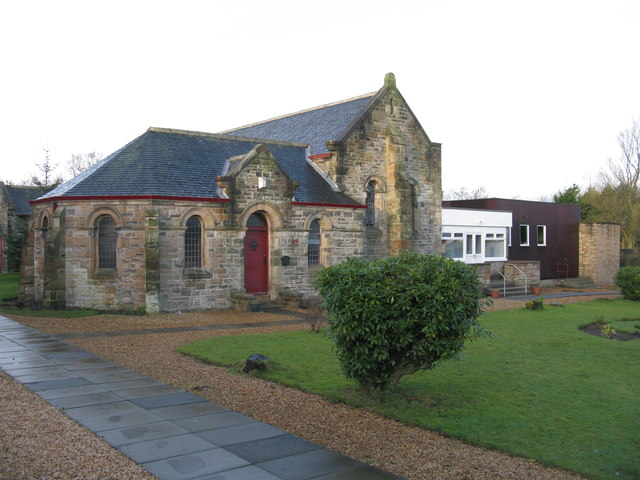
Gartcosh Parish Church

Gartcosh is now primarily a residential area. In recent years, new housing by Redrow Homes, Thomas Mitchell Homes and other smaller developers has been built in and around the old village. There are plans for further developments in the surrounding areas of farm land.

Gartcosh Business Interchange is currently being developed on the site of the old strip mill and steel works. As of 2006, Scottish Enterprise and North Lanarkshire council had invested £18m on land reclamation and upgrading transport access. This project will provide over 170,000 square metres (1,800,000 sq ft) of business space serviced by the transport links detailed below.

The Scottish Crime Campus is located within Gartcosh Business Interchange. The development of this facility was originally administered by the Scottish Police Services Authority but following police reform in 2013 all of their undertakings, including the Crime Campus, were transferred to the Scottish Police Authority. The facility was originally scheduled for completion in 2010 with cost of the development put at approximately £65 million. However the budget for the project ultimately reached £75 million and the facility was opened by Princess Anne on 20th June 2014. The Scottish Crime Campus houses elements of several of Police Scotland's partner agencies in the Criminal Justice system at Serious and Organised Crime level. These are parts of the Crown Office and Procurator Fiscal Service, the National Crime Agency, HM Revenue and Customs and the Scottish Police Authority Forensic Laboratory for the Glasgow area.

Next to the campus is the Gartcosh Local Nature Reserve. Although relatively small, it contains a variety of wildlife, including protected species such as a great crested newt colony (the largest in Scotland).

There is a Church of Scotland parish in Gartcosh which has Bible Study, Sunday services and a Sunday Club for children. The church hall is used for various community projects, including 1st Gartcosh Boys' Brigade and both slimming and exercise groups.

The defunct Anglican church at the top of the hill on Lochend Road was demolished in 1997 for property development.

The original Gartcosh Police Station closed in the 1990s. However, most of Gartcosh continues to be served by the Cumbernauld Sub-division of Police Scotland. Gartcosh railway station and its access roads, the defunct Chapman's public house, and a small number of houses in the village to the south of the railway line, are served by Monklands Sub-division operating from Coatbridge Police Office.

== Future development ==
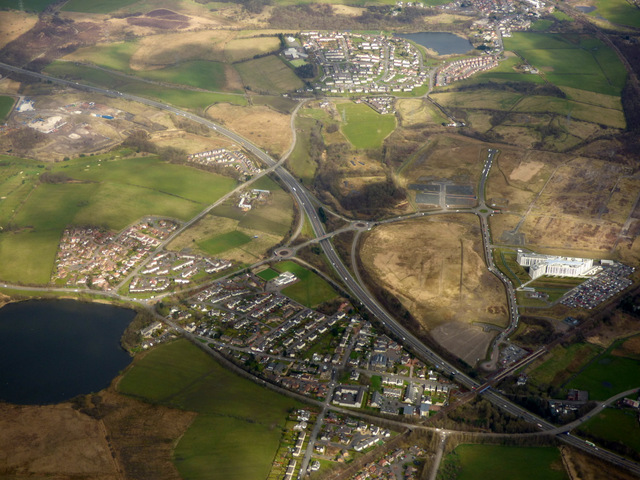
The M73 with Gartcosh in the foreground and Glenboig in the background.

North Lanarkshire Council have identified open space areas around Gartcosh and Glenboig as potential sites for a "Community Growth Area". This, in effect, means there is potential for up to 3000 homes to be built in Gartcosh and Glenboig, of which approximately 1800 are to be built in the Gartcosh area. At least 25% of this must be "affordable housing". Provisions will be made for infrastructure and amenities to support such a large development. Such a development will have significant impact on the local landscape with much of the green belt and farmland being developed into housing and retail areas.

== Transport ==
=== General Transport Information ===
The M73 motorway is the main transport link, with Junction 2A providing road access to the village. Gartcosh also benefits from a railway station which was built at a cost of £3.5 million and officially opened in March 2005 by Princess Anne.

=== Road and Rail Links ===
- M73 - north to A80(M) providing motorway access to North Glasgow, Cumbernauld, Falkirk, Stirling and The North
- M73 - south to M74 providing motorway access to South Glasgow, Hamilton, Motherwell, Carlisle and The South
- A752 - north to Muirhead
- A752 - south to A89 providing access to Coatbridge and Baillieston and continuing south to Uddingston and Bothwell
- A752 - south to A8(M) providing motorway access to Edinburgh, Glasgow and the Central Belt.
- B806 - West to Glasgow Fort Shopping Centre
- Gartcosh railway station providing direct rail service to Glasgow Queen Street, Cumbernauld and Falkirk Grahamston, and to Edinburgh via either Glasgow or Falkirk stations.

== Film, TV and other media ==
- The Big Mill (1963) colour, sound 25 mins - dir. Laurence Henson shows steel being produced at Ravenscraig and Gartcosh
- Make Way For Steel (1966) colour, sound 29 mins by Templar Film Studios shows the building of the steel works at Ravenscraig and Gartcosh

Gartcosh is often mentioned as the location of a fictional police station in the Inspector Rebus novels by Ian Rankin.
