= Gartloch Hospital =

- NHS Greater Glasgow
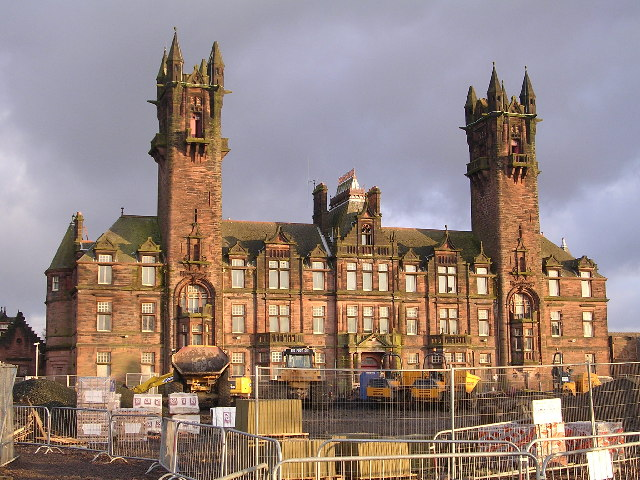
- Main Administration building of Gartloch Hospital

- Shown in Glasgow

Geography
- Location: Glasgow, Scotland
- Coordinates: 55.87958°N 4.10469°W

Organisation
- Care system: NHS Scotland
- Type: Specialist

Services
- Emergency department: No
- Speciality: Mental health

History
- Founded: 1896
- Closed: 1996

Links
- Lists: Hospitals in Scotland

Gartloch Hospital was a psychiatric hospital located on Gartloch Road near the village of Gartcosh, Scotland. It opened in 1896 and was officially closed in 1996. It was managed by NHS Greater Glasgow.

== History ==
In January 1889 the Glasgow Corporation acquired the Gartloch Estate for the purpose of building a hospital. A foundation stone for the hospital, which was designed by Thomson and Sandilands, was laid in November 1892. It accepted its first patients in 1896 and was officially opened as the Gartloch District Asylum in June 1897. A nurses' home was completed in June 1900 and a tuberculosis sanatorium opened in December 1902. Bed capacity reached a peak of 830 in 1904. It served as an emergency hospital using hutted accommodation during the Second World War and joined the National Health Service in 1948.

Robin Farquharson was an inmate at the hospital at the time he joined the Scottish Union of Mental Patients in the early 1970s. After the introduction of Care in the Community in the early 1980s, the hospital went into a period of decline and closed in 1996.

Many of the surrounding buildings were subsequently converted into homes or demolished to create Gartloch Village but the Category A-listed administration building remains intact but derelict.

== In popular culture ==
In 1993, the hospital was used in the BBC television series Takin' Over the Asylum starring David Tennant and Ken Stott where its distinctive French Renaissance style architecture served as the exterior of the fictional St. Jude's Hospital. In 2005 a film Gartloch Hospital was released which gave an account of the history of the hospital. It was the winner of the Best Factual Film at the Scottish Mental Health Art and Film Festival, in 2007.

== See also ==
- List of Category A listed buildings in Glasgow
