= M9 motorway (Scotland) =

Motorway in Scotland

M9
- M9 highlighted in blue
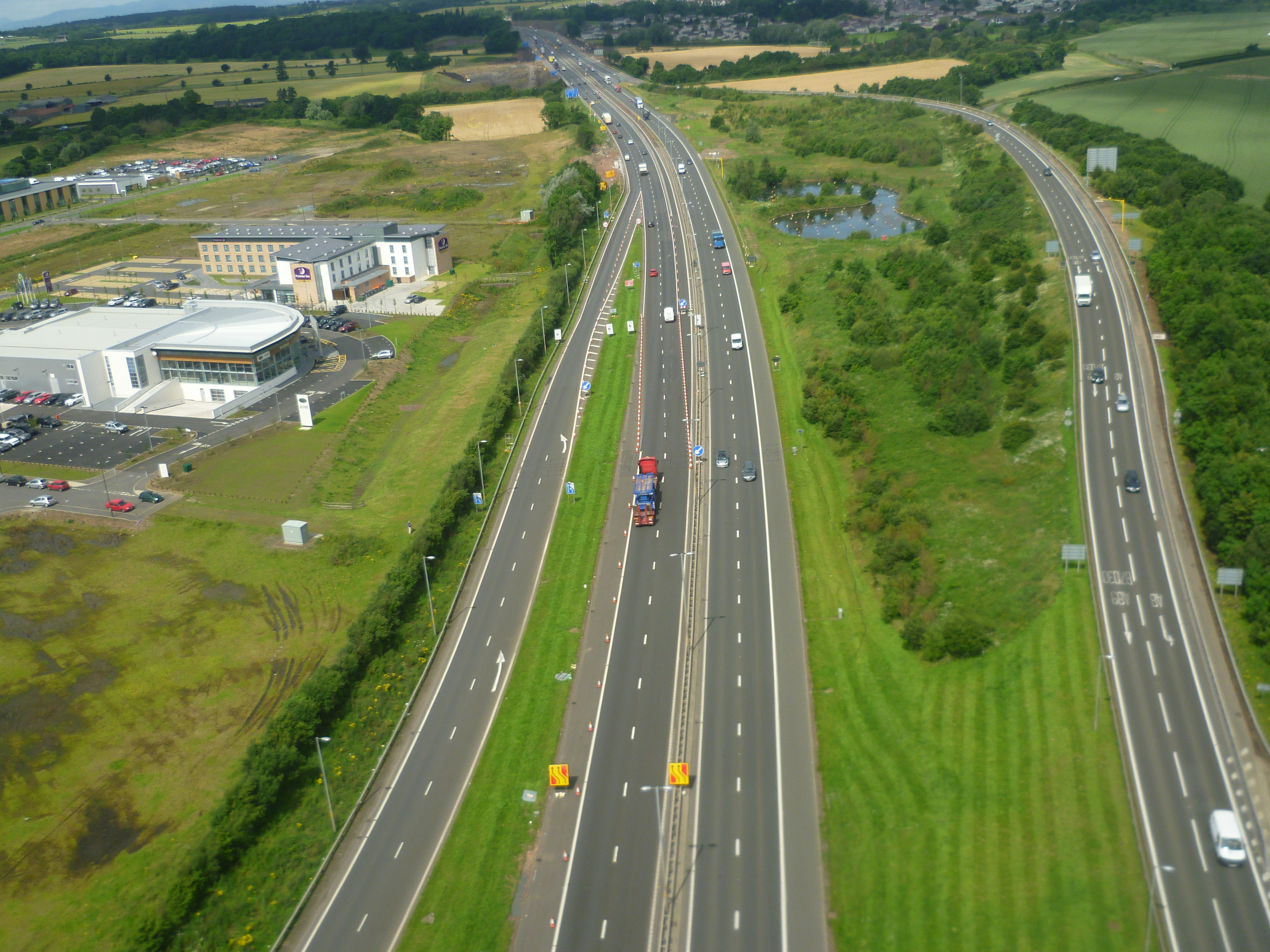
- Looking northwest from junction 1, 2012

Route information
- Maintained by Transport Scotland
- Length: 33.0 mi (53.1 km)
- Existed: 1968–present
- History: Opened: 1970; Completed: 1980

Major junctions
- Southeast end: Newbridge
- M8 motorway J1a → M90 motorway J7 → M876 motorway J8 → M876 motorway J9 → M80 motorway
- Northwest end: Dunblane

Location
- Country: United Kingdom
- Constituent country: Scotland
- Counties: Edinburgh, West Lothian, Falkirk, Stirling
- Primary destinations: Edinburgh Airport; Falkirk; Stirling

Road network
- Roads in the United Kingdom; Motorways; A and B road zones
← M8	→ M11

The M9 is a major motorway in Scotland. It runs from the outskirts of Edinburgh, bypassing the towns of Linlithgow, Falkirk, Grangemouth and Stirling to end at Dunblane.

== History ==
The first section was Polmont and Falkirk Bypass which opened on 28 August 1968 This was followed by the Newbridge Bypass which opened on 25 November 1970, the third section Lathalllan to Muriehall (Linlithgow), which joined the two together opened on 18 December 1972.

In April 2022, work began on a new junction at Winchburgh. Winchburgh Developments contributed £40 million towards the construction cost.

== Route ==
The road is approximately 30 miles (48 km) long, and runs in a roughly north-west direction from the M8. It meets the A8 at Newbridge – a traffic blackspot before the junction was grade separated. Its next junction is with the M90, the first part of which used to be a spur of the M9 towards the Forth Road Bridge. This spur ended at the single carriageway A8000 road 2 miles (3.2 km) short of the bridge, but was extended in September 2007 to meet the A90 at Scotstoun.

The road shares space with 1 mile (1.6 km) of the M876 en route to the Kincardine Bridge east of Stenhousemuir, at this point the motorway has 3 lanes in each direction, making it the most northerly stretch of motorway in the UK to be 3 lanes wide. At Stirling it meets the M80 (junction 9 of both motorways), taking over the main route through the Carse of Lecropt to the final roundabout at Dunblane. From there, the A9 runs all the way to Thurso. Moto services are located at the M9/M80 junction, accessed via a roundabout which allows access to all routes.

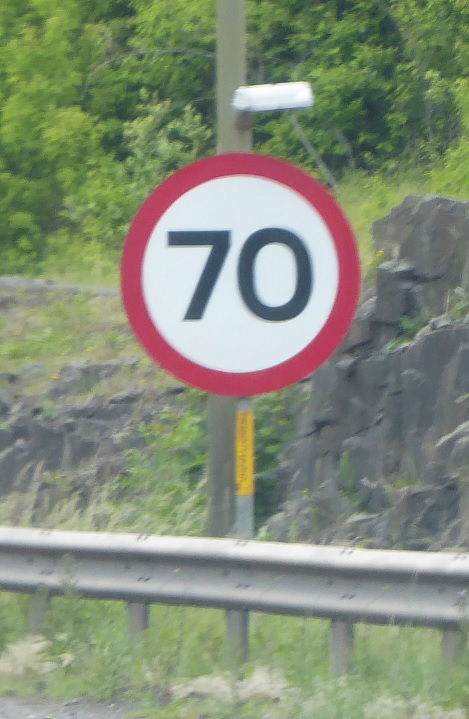
Speed limit sign at the exit for Edinburgh (Junction 2)

== Junctions ==
M90 motorway junctions
County	Location	mi	km	Junction	Destinations	Notes
Edinburgh	—	0	0	— (Note: 55.926°N 3.403°W)	M8 – Edinburgh, Glasgow	
Edinburgh	Newbridge	1.4	2.3	1 (Note: 55.978°N 3.384°W)	A8 – Edinburgh Airport; A89 – Broxburn	
Edinburgh	Kirkliston	2.7	4.32	1A (Note: 55.955°N 3.419°W)	M90 – Dundee, Perth	
West Lothian	Winchburgh	5.4	8.7	1B (Note: 55.970°N 3.458°W)	B8020 – Winchburgh	
West Lothian	Old Philpstoun	7.58	12.2	2 (Note: 55.982°N 3.515°W)	B8046 – Forth Road Bridge, Kincardine A904 – Kincardine Bridge	no Southbound entrance or Northbound exit
West Lothian	Linlithgow	9.9	16.0	3 (Note: 55.987°N 3.557°W)	A803 – Linlithgow A904 – Bo'ness	no Northbound entrance or Southbound exit
Falkirk	Polmont	13.1	21.0	4 (Note: 55.998°N 3.682°W)	A801 – Bathgate, Livingston A803 – Polmont	
Falkirk	Grangemouth	13.8	22.2	5 (Note: 55.997°N 3.717°W)	A905 – Grangemouth, Falkirk A905 - Grangemouth, Bo'ness	
Falkirk	Grangemouth	15.7	25.3	6 (Note: 56.015°N 3.748°W)	A905 – Grangemouth Falkirk	no Southbound entrance or Northbound exit
Falkirk	Larbert	17.7	28.4	7 (Note: 56.044°N 3.785°W)	M876 – Kincardine Bridge	
Falkirk	Larbert	18.6	30.0	8 (Note: 56.043°N 3.815°W)	M876 – Glasgow	no Northbound entrance or Southbound exit from the motorway
Stirling	Bannockburn	28.0	45.1	9 (Note: 56.077°N 3.920°W)	A91 – Stirling A872 – Denny, Glasgow, Carlisle M80	
Stirling	Bannockburn	28.0	45.1	Stirling Services		
Stirling	Craigforth	30.45	49.0	10 (Note: 56.133°N 3.970°W)	A84 – Stirling, Callander, Crianlarich	
Stirling	Keir	33.0	53.1	11 (Note: 56.168°N 3.973°W)	A9 - Perth, Inverness; A9 -Bridge of Allan; B824 - Doune; B8033 - Dunblane	
1.000 mi = 1.609 km; 1.000 km = 0.621 mi: Incomplete access

Coordinate list

== See also ==
- List of motorways in the United Kingdom
