= Robroyston railway station =

Railway station in Glasgow, Scotland

Robroyston
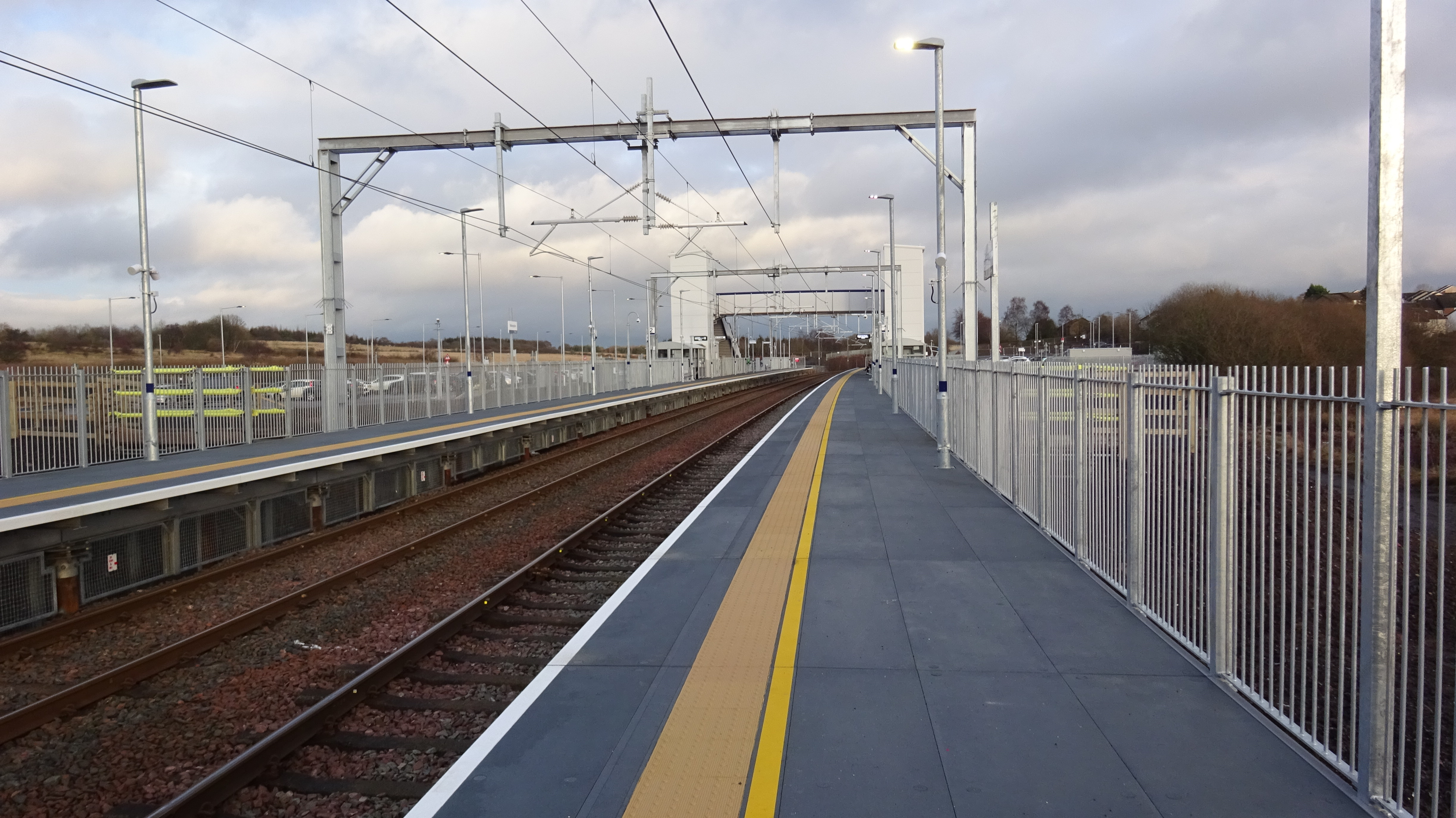

General information
- Location: Robroyston, Glasgow; Scotland
- Coordinates: 55°53′15″N 4°10′20″W
- Manager: ScotRail
- Transit authority: SPT
- Platforms: 2

Other information
- Station code: RRN

Key dates
- 1898: Opened
- 1917: Closed
- 1919: Reopened
- 11 June 1956: Closed
- 15 December 2019: Reopened

Passengers
- 2021/22: ▲0.108 million
- 2022/23: ▲0.160 million
- 2023/24: ▲0.245 million
- 2024/25: ▼0.243 million
- 2025/26: ▲0.290 million
Location
Notes
- Passenger statistics from the Office of Rail and Road

Robroyston railway station serves the suburbs of Millerston and Robroyston in Glasgow, Scotland. The station is located on the Cumbernauld Line, and is managed by ScotRail. The station, which includes a park and ride facility and a through road connecting the two communities, opened on 15 December 2019. It is part of a wider development plan for the local area including 1,600 new houses.

There was previously a Robroyston station (and a marshalling yard) at the same location, on the line originally operated by the Garnkirk and Glasgow Railway which later formed part of the Caledonian Railway main line; this operated from 1898 to 1917, and from 1919 to 1956.

== Services ==
From Monday to Saturday, there are 2tph to Glasgow Queen Street, 1tph to Cumbernauld and 1tph to Falkirk Grahamston. On Sundays, there is 1tph to Cumbernauld and Glasgow Queen Street.

| Preceding station | National Rail | Following station |
|---|---|---|
| Springburn | ScotRail; Cumbernauld Line | Stepps |

== Facilities ==
The station acts as a park and ride location, with 231 spaces, 12 being for EVs. The station features a footbridge with lifts allowing for step-free access throughout the station, each platform has a waiting shelter and departure boards. There is also a ticket machine allowing for the collection of pre-paid tickets as well as tickets bought on the day of travel using card.
