= Annathill =

Village in North Lanarkshire, Scotland

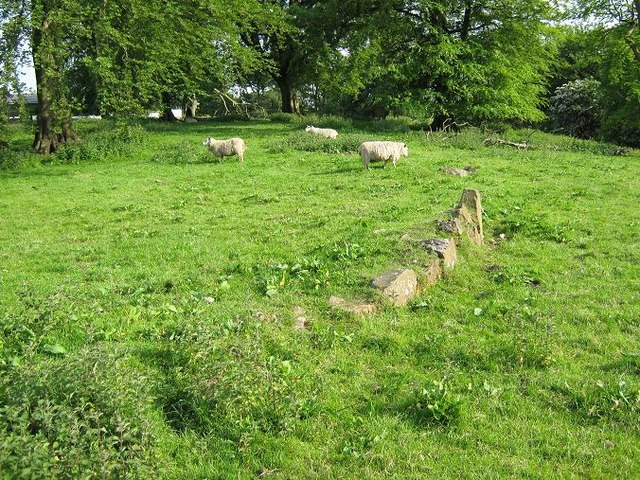
Stone circle at Annathill

Annathill (Scots: Annathull, Scottish Gaelic: Cnoc na h-Annaid; 55.9144°N 4.0463°W) is a small village located near Coatbridge in North Lanarkshire, Scotland, although closer to Glenboig. The name "Annathill" is thought to be derived from the Gaelic word annaid, meaning a patron saint's church. Annathill is on the banks of the Mollins Burn, a tributary of the Luggie Water.

== History ==
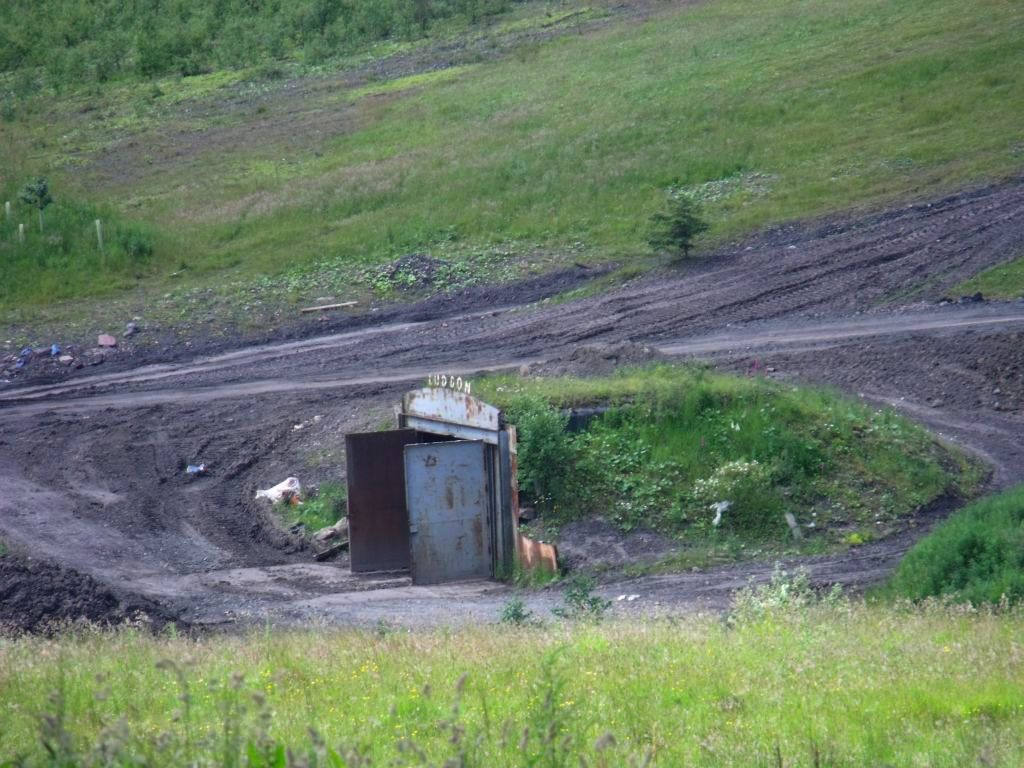
Annathill, underground workshop

Annathill was primarily famous for coal, as it was home to Bedlay Colliery. The majority of miners from Bedlay Colliery came from Annathill and there were three "Miners' Rows" of houses along with various shops, a butchers and a pub which were all built around the same time Bedlay Colliery was sunk in 1905. On 11 December 1981, Bedlay Colliery was closed by the then Conservative government and was left abandoned until 1982 when it was filled in (or "capped") and the complex demolished. Post-closure, in the 1990s, the land on which Bedlay Colliery sat on (owned by the National Coal Board) underwent an operation to restore the ground to what it looked like before the colliery was sunk. This operation is still underway.

== Population (1991 Census) ==
According to the 1991 Census, Annathill had a population of 237.

== See also ==
- List of places in North Lanarkshire
