= M80 motorway =

Motorway in Scotland

M80
- M80 highlighted in blue

Route information
- Length: 25.0 mi (40.2 km)
- Existed: 1974–present
- History: Constructed 1974-2011

Major junctions
- Southwest end: Glasgow; Blochairn
- Northeast end: Stirling

Section 1
- Major intersections: M8 motorway M73 motorway M876 motorway M9 motorway Junction 9

Location
- Country: United Kingdom
- Primary destinations: Stirling, Cumbernauld, Glasgow

Road network
- Roads in the United Kingdom; Motorways; A and B road zones
← M77	→ M90

The M80 is a motorway in Scotland's central belt, running between Glasgow and Stirling via Cumbernauld and Denny and linking the M8, M73 and M9 motorways. Following completion in 2011, the motorway is 25 miles (40 km) long. Despite being only a two lane motorway, parts of the M80 Stepps Bypass are used by around 60,000 vehicles per day.

The M80 was constructed in three sections. The first section, from the village of Haggs to the M9 near Stirling, opened in 1974, followed in 1992 by the section from the M8 to the town of Stepps. The section from Stepps to Haggs was completed in September 2011, though it partially opened in February 2011 when the Moodiesburn bypass, from Stepps to the M73 at Mollinsburn, was completed; the section of the A80 from Mollinsburn to Haggs was then upgraded.

== Route ==
=== M8 to Stepps (junctions 1 to 3) ===
This section of road was originally envisioned during the M8's construction in the 1960s, but was not realised until 1992, and is also known as the 'Stepps Bypass'. It begins at M8 junction 13 in the Glasgow suburb of Blochairn. Construction began in 1990.

It runs to the north of Stepps, under the Cumbernauld Railway Line with exits for Bishopbriggs, Lenzie and Kirkintilloch, where it continues onto the new section, completed in 2011.

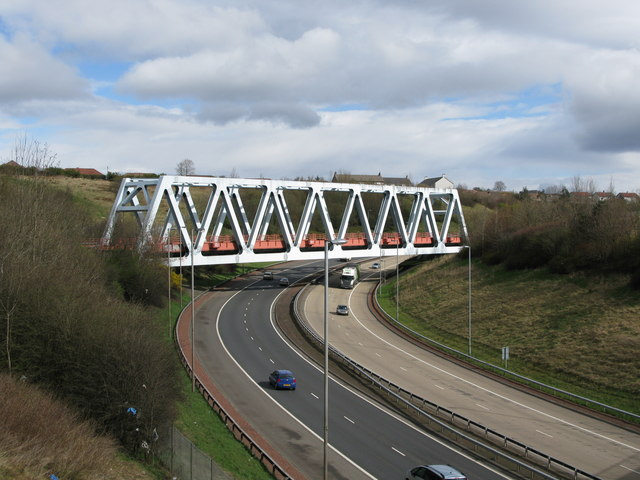
The M80 near its southern terminus at Blackhill, with the bridge carrying the Cumbernauld-Stepps railway line

=== Stepps to Haggs (junctions 3 to 7) ===
The Stepps to Haggs section was completed in September 2011, completing the M80 route.

A short section of offline upgrade takes the route from the former terminus at junction 3 (Stepps), to a new junction with the M73. After this, the route follows an on-line upgrade of the former A80 through Cumbernauld. It is mainly two-lane dual carriageway.

=== Haggs to Pirnhall (junctions 7 to 9) ===
At the junction with the A803, the road rejoins the older section of the M80 (opened in 1974) and runs for about 1 mile (1.6 km) until it meets the M876 for traffic towards the Kincardine Bridge.

The M80 then continues north, passing to the west of Denny and after 5 miles (8.0 km) meets a junction with the A91 (the same roundabout interchange also hosts Stirling Services) and then merges into the M9 just outside Stirling at Bannockburn.

== M80 Stepps to Haggs completion ==
The M80 Stepps to Haggs Completion Project connected the two-halves of the current motorway via an online upgrade of the existing A80, passing through Cumbernauld and Auchenkilns, and the offline creation of new motorway from Stepps to Mollinsburn. Although various plans were considered from the 1970s to 1990s to connect the two sections of motorway, it was not until 2003 that a definitive timeline for proposing, developing and executing a completion plan was announced.

Two routes were proposed for development: the so-called Kelvin Valley route, which would create a bypass to the north of the existing line of the A80, and the "online" upgrade of the existing A80 to motorway grade. In October 2005, the project was put to a public inquiry, which ended in August 2006. The Kelvin Valley route was not chosen as it would have breached the Antonine Wall and destroyed the Castlecary Roman fort; instead the online upgrade of the A80 through Cumbernauld was selected.

Originally budgeted to cost £130–180 million, but as of August 2010 was estimated to cost £320 million, preparatory works were started in November 2008, and construction work began in January 2009. The project was completed in September 2011.

The upgrade plans were set into three discrete phases. Phase one involved the creation of 8 kilometres (5.0 mi) of road from Stepps, routing north of Muirhead, Moodiesburn and Chryston, and meeting the line of the existing A80 at Mollinsburn with the construction of a new interchange, connecting the M80 with the M73 and the western section of the A80. Phase two required the online upgrade of the A80 between Mollinsburn and Auchenkilns, with the attendant upgrade of adjoining on-slip and off-slip roads, meeting the Auchenkilns Interchange. The interchange was opened in November 2005 after the online grade separation of the Auchenkilns Roundabout from the line of the dual carriageway created a grade separated dumbbell interchange, linking the A80 (and subsequently the M80) with the A73 and B8048. Phase three saw the A80 upgraded online from Auchenkilns to the Haggs Interchange east of Cumbernauld – also seeing some junctions being upgraded, but with some being removed – completing the connection of the western M80 to the eastern M80, and connecting to the M876 and M9 motorways. The M80 crosses the Glasgow to Edinburgh via Falkirk railway line and Forth and Clyde Canal.

== Junctions ==
M80 motorway junctions
County	Location	mi	km	Junction	Destinations	Notes
Glasgow	Glasgow	0	0	1 (Note: 55.870°N 4.199°W)	M8 – Glasgow, Edinburgh	
Glasgow	Glasgow	1.7	2.7	2 (Note: 55.890°N 4.178°W)	B765- Bishopbriggs	
North Lanarkshire	Moodiesburn	3.5	5.6	3 (Note: 55.901°N 4.138°W)	A806 – Kirkintilloch, Stepps	
North Lanarkshire	Moodiesburn	6.9	11.0	4 (Note: 55.922°N 4.063°W)	Moodiesburn, Cumbernauld	No Eastbound entrance or Westbound exit
North Lanarkshire	Moodiesburn	7.3	11.8	— (Note: 55.923°N 4.051°W)	M73 – Gartcosh	No Westbound entrance or Eastbound exit
North Lanarkshire	Cumbernauld	9.0	14.5	4a (Note: 55.940°N 4.020°W)	A8011 – Balloch, Cumbernauld	No Westbound entrance or Eastbound exit
North Lanarkshire	Cumbernauld	9.4	15.1	5 (Note: 55.943°N 4.013°W)	A73 – Carluke, Airdrie	
North Lanarkshire	Cumbernauld	11.6	18.7	6 (Note: 55.966°N 3.972°W)	A8011 – Cumbernauld, B816- Castlecary	
Falkirk	—	13.3	21.4	6a (Note: 55.983°N 3.943°W)	B816- Castlecary, Allandale	No Southbound entrance or Northbound exit
Falkirk	—	13.9	22.3	7 (Note: 55.991°N 3.943°W)	A803 – Haggs, Banknock	
Falkirk	Denny	15.2	24.4	8 (Note: 56.002°N 3.917°W)	M876 – Kincardine, Falkirk	No Northbound entrance or Southbound exit
Stirling	—	20.6	33.1	9 (Note: 56.076°N 3.924°W)	M9 – Grangemouth, Edinburgh, Dunblane; A91 – Cupar, St Andrews A872 – Denny, Stirling	
1.000 mi = 1.609 km; 1.000 km = 0.621 mi: Incomplete access

Coordinate list

== See also ==
- List of motorways in the United Kingdom
