= Stepps railway station =

Railway station in North Lanarkshire, Scotland

Stepps
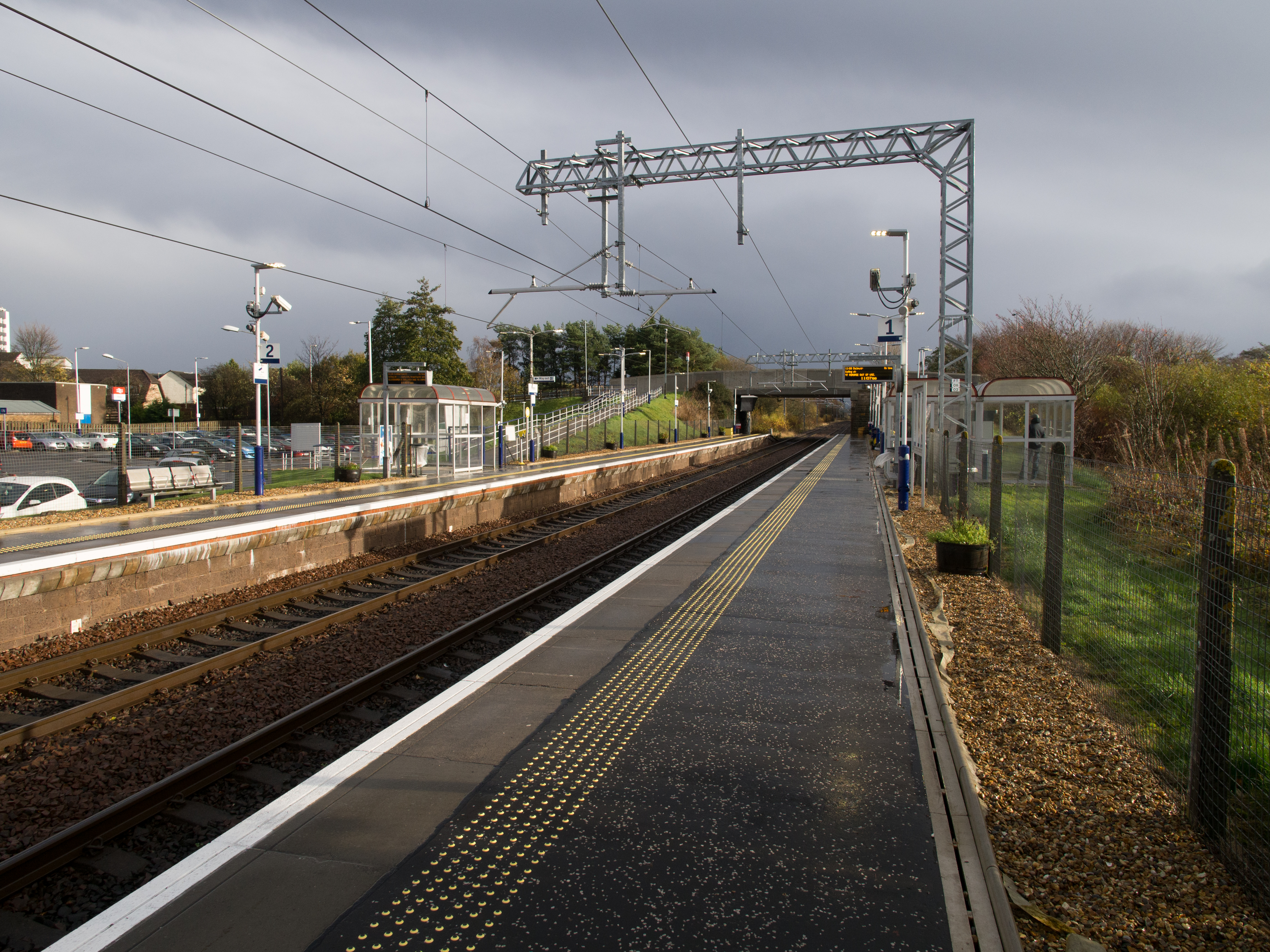

General information
- Location: Stepps, North Lanarkshire; Scotland
- Coordinates: 55.8901°N 4.1406°W
- Grid reference: NS662684
- Manager: ScotRail
- Transit authority: SPT
- Platforms: 2

Other information
- Station code: SPS

Key dates
- 1831 or 1832: Opened as Stepps Road
- 5 November 1962: Closed
- 15 May 1989: Reopened as Stepps

Passengers
- 2021/22: ▲0.135 million
- 2022/23: ▲0.193 million
- 2023/24: ▲0.266 million
- 2025/26: ▲0.291 million
Location
Notes
- Passenger statistics from the Office of Rail and Road

Stepps railway station serves the town of Stepps, North Lanarkshire, Scotland. The railway station is located on the Cumbernauld Line, 5¼ miles (8 km) north east of Glasgow Queen Street (High Level) and is managed by ScotRail.

== History ==
The station is sited on the former Garnkirk and Glasgow Railway, which originally opened back to 1831 and later formed part of the Caledonian Railway main line from Glasgow Buchanan Street. A station at Stepps (originally known as Stepps Road) was opened on this line sometime around 1831-2 (when the line was extended to Coatbridge), which was then closed by the British Railways on 5 November 1962.

Electrification was established in 2014 with services from Springburn being extended to Cumbernauld.

== Services ==
=== 2017 ===
Monday to Saturday, there is a half-hourly EMU service to Glasgow Queen Street Low Level and Dalmuir westbound and Cumbernauld eastbound along with an hourly diesel service between Queen Street High Level and Falkirk Grahamston. Electric services reverse at Springburn to access the North Clyde Line following the inauguration of electrification between Springburn & Cumbernauld on 18 May 2014, but the service to/from Falkirk remains diesel operated at present.

On Sundays there is an hourly service to Partick via Glasgow Queen St LL and to Cumbernauld.

=== 2018/19 ===
From December 2018, a new half hourly Glasgow - Edinburgh via Cumbernauld and Falkirk Grahamston service started, replacing the hourly DMU service and taking over the existing EMU service between Springburn and Cumbernauld. The service uses new Class 385 EMUs.

Preceding station	National Rail	Following station
Robroyston	ScotRail; Cumbernauld Line	Gartcosh

== Facilities ==
The station has a car park as well as cycle storage, but is not staffed. There is a ticket machine on the westbound platform, but not on the eastbound platform. A new 48 space car park was opened on the former site of St Joseph's Hall.
