= Stepps =

Coordinates: 55.89079°N 4.15220°W

Stepps: Scottish Gaelic: Na Staran
- Town
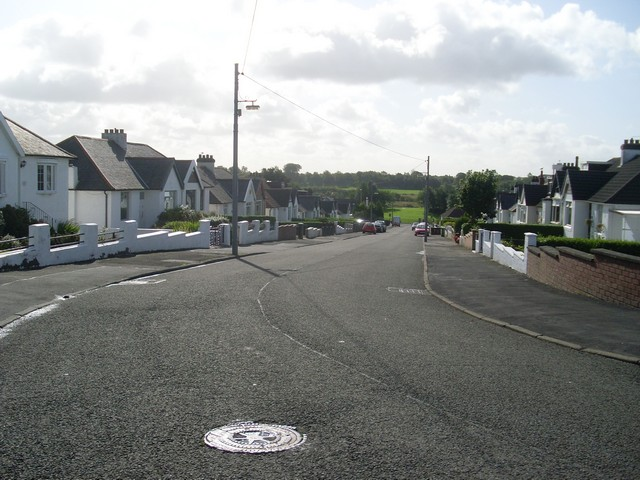
- Looking down Third Avenue towards Cumbernauld Road

- Location within North Lanarkshire
- Population: 7,639 (2022)
- OS grid reference: NS655685
- Council area: North Lanarkshire
- Lieutenancy area: Lanarkshire
- Country: Scotland
- Sovereign state: United Kingdom
- Post town: GLASGOW
- Postcode district: G33
- Dialling code: 0141
- Police: Scotland
- Fire: Scottish
- Ambulance: Scottish
- UK Parliament: Coatbridge, Chryston and Bellshill
- Scottish Parliament: Coatbridge and Chryston

Stepps (Scottish Gaelic: Ceumannan) is a town in North Lanarkshire, Scotland, near the north-eastern outskirts of Glasgow. The town retains a historic heart around its church in Whitehill Avenue, whilst examples of Victorian and Edwardian housing can still be found. The travel connections by road and rail mean residents work in Glasgow, Edinburgh, Falkirk, Stirling and beyond. The town is located in close proximity to the new Seven Lochs Wetland Park, from which views to the Campsies and Loch Lomond can be enjoyed. Its recently upgraded amenities include a new primary school, library and sports facilities.

== History ==
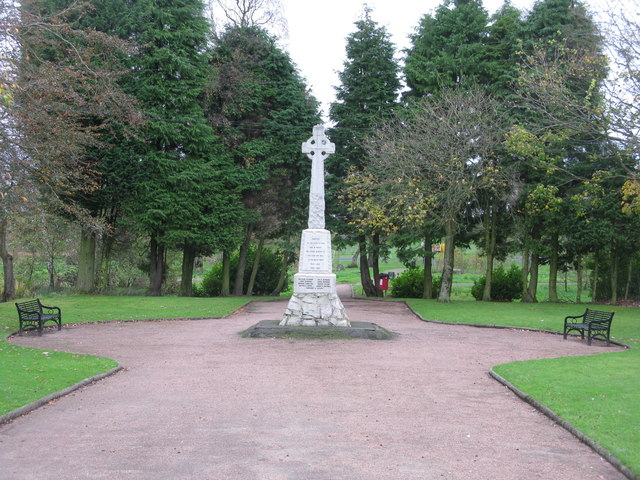
Stepps War Memorial

The etymology of the name is uncertain, but may relate to stepping stones over boggy ground. Early maps give the name as Coshnocksteps. Steps is included on several old documents including maps by John Ainslie, Thomas Richardson and William Forrest.

Originally part of the Garnkirk estate, the name for the settlement appears to pre-date that of the main road through its centre, Stepps Road, which was named in the 19th century. The railway came to Steps around 1831. The name and spelling Stepps only became accepted when the name of the railway station formally changed to Stepps in 1924.

Stepps is home to one of Scotland's oldest Hockey Clubs. Formed in 1913, Stepps Hockey Club is building towards its centenary celebrations and currently competes in the Second Division of the Scottish National Hockey League. The tennis club was founded in 1905 and new facilities, including all-weather courts, were recently completed. The local cultural centre is home to the library, meeting rooms for local clubs and all-weather facilities for football and hockey. It is located on the same campus as Stepps Primary School, all of which was built in 2007.

== Demography ==
=== Population ===
According to data gathered by the 2022 Scottish census, Stepps has a population of 7,639 inhabitants.

== Transport ==
The town is served by a railway station on SPT's Cumbernauld Line, providing a quick commute to central Glasgow, and by the A80 road. The town was bypassed by the southern section of the M80 motorway in 1992; that section of motorway is still referred to locally as the Stepps Bypass. The M80 upgrade between Stepps and Haggs began in 2009 and was completed on 26 August 2011. The project cost around £320 million.

The town's main bus service is the number 38C bus.

== Schools ==
Stepps has two primary schools. Stepps Primary School was established in 1902 but opened in new premises, shared with Stepps Public Library on a different site in 2007. Most of its pupils go on to Chryston High School. St Joseph's Roman Catholic Primary School was first opened in 1900 but a new building was opened in 1985. Most of its pupils go on to Our Lady's High School, Cumbernauld.

== Businesses ==
Historical industries in the area include a brass foundry, whisky blending, and coal mining. In the 1990s the Buchanan Business Park was developed. Modern businesses include Bannatyne's Health Club and up until recently, Solutions Driven. The town is home to the Garfield House Hotel and Premier Inn, both on Cumbernauld Road. Scottish Water is also headquartered in Stepps.
