= M73 motorway =

Motorway in Scotland

M73
- M73 highlighted in blue

Route information
- Part of E05
- Length: 7.0 mi (11.3 km)
- Existed: 1969–present
- History: constructed 1969 – 2011

Major junctions
- South end: Uddingston
- M74 motorway M8 motorway M80 motorway
- North end: Mollinsburn

Location
- Country: United Kingdom
- Primary destinations: Cumbernauld, Hamilton, Motherwell, Carlisle

Road network
- Roads in the United Kingdom; Motorways; A and B road zones
| ← M69 | → M74 |

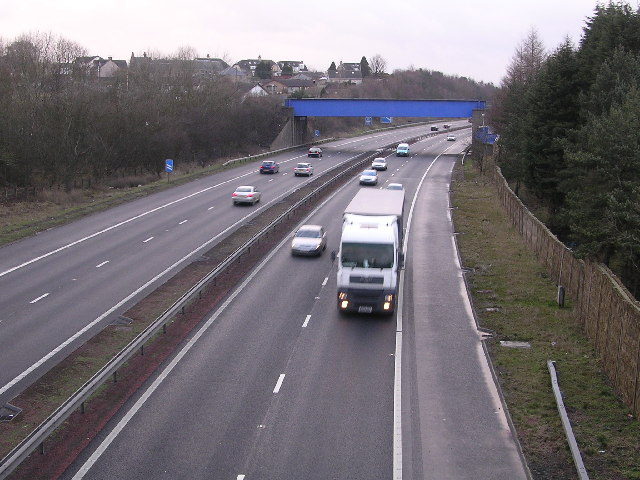
The M73 just before the Gartcosh cutoff

The M73 is a motorway in Glasgow and North Lanarkshire, Scotland. It is 7 miles (11 km) long and connects the M74 motorway with the M80 motorway, providing an eastern bypass for Glasgow. The short stretch between junctions 1 and 2 is part of unsigned international E-road network E05, where it continues along the M8 through Glasgow. To the south, the M74 motorway is also part of the E05.

== Route ==
Starting at the M74 junction 4 (M73 junction 1) by the River Clyde, it proceeds north with Birkenshaw to the east and crosses the Whifflet railway line before meeting the M8 and A8 at a three-level interchange, east of Swinton. The North Clyde railway line passes underneath the M73 immediately north of this interchange. The M73 then passes alongside Woodend Loch before reaching junction 2A at Gartcosh. There is then a further two miles (three kilometres) of motorway, before traffic exits onto the M80 eastbound (on a north easterly heading).

The road is a dual three-lane road between junctions 1 and 2, and a dual two-lane road between junctions 2 and 3. It is subject to the national speed limit.

== History and future plans ==
Construction began in 1969 with the motorway opening between May 1971 and April 1972. Junction 2A was added at a later date.

In 2011, the northern end was extended as part of the M80 completion project. This connects the motorway into the completed M80 at a new interchange. Further work in 2017 improved access from the M74 at Junction 3A, and from the M8 and A8 at Baillieston Interchange.

== Junctions ==
M73 motorway junctions
| County | Location | mi | km | Junction | Destinations | Notes |
|---|---|---|---|---|---|---|
| North Lanarkshire | Glasgow | 0 | 0 | 1 (Note: 55.8326°N 4.1010°W) | M74 – Carlisle, Glasgow | |
| Glasgow | Glasgow | 1.5 | 2.4 | 2 (Note: 55.8530°N 4.0898°W) | M8 – Edinburgh, Glasgow; A8 – Barlanark, A89 – Gallowgate, Coatbridge | No Northbound entrance from West on M8 |
| North Lanarkshire | Glasgow | 4.2 | 6.8 | 2a (Note: 55.8908°N 4.0750°W) | A752 – Gartcosh, Muirhead | |
| North Lanarkshire | Glasgow | 6.4 | 10.3 | 3 (Note: 55.9197°N 4.0616°W) | M80 – Stirling; A80 – Moodiesburn, Chryston | No exit to M80 going Westward or entrance from M80 from the West |
1.000 mi = 1.609 km; 1.000 km = 0.621 mi: Concurrency terminus; Incomplete access

Coordinate list

== Gallery ==
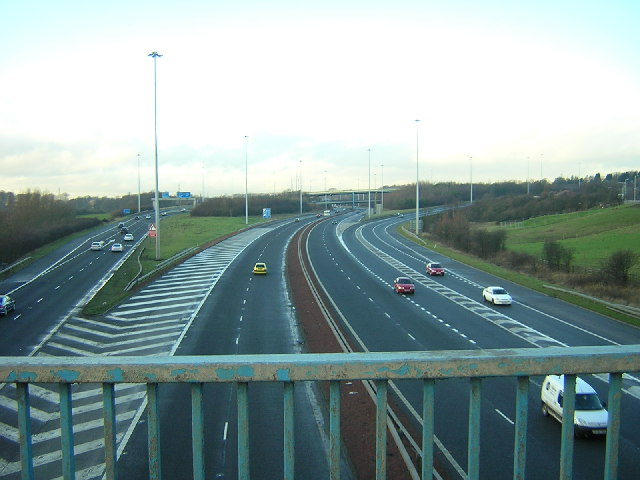
The interchange with the M74.

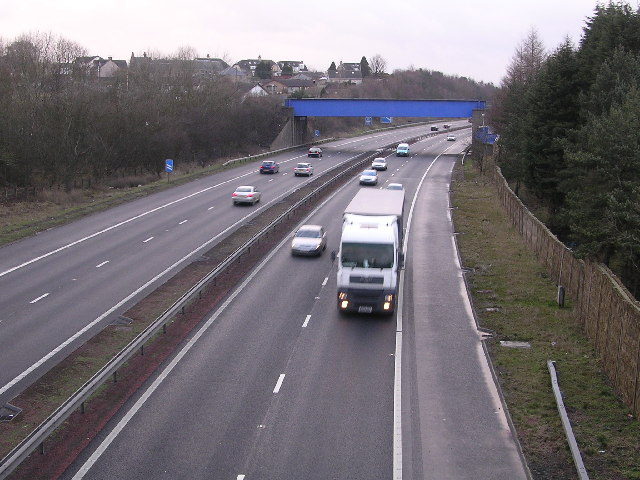
The M73 just before the Gartcosh cutoff

== See also ==
- List of motorways in the United Kingdom
- M80 Motorway – Completion Project
