= Gartcosh railway station =

Railway station in North Lanarkshire, Scotland

Gartcosh Scottish Gaelic: Gart a' Chòis
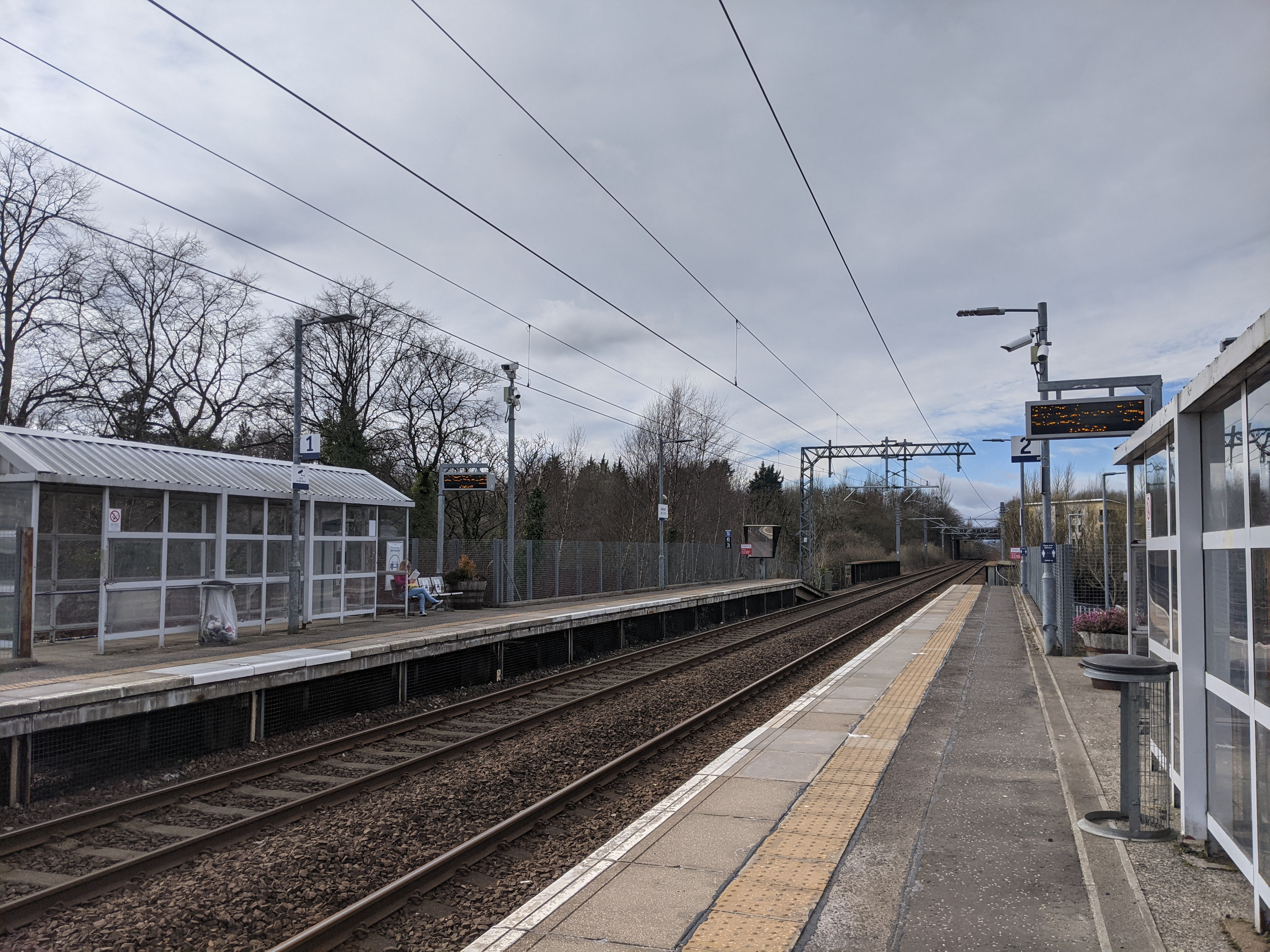

General information
- Location: Gartcosh, North Lanarkshire; Scotland
- Coordinates: 55.8855°N 4.0788°W
- Grid reference: NS700677
- Manager: ScotRail
- Transit authority: SPT
- Platforms: 2

Other information
- Station code: GRH

History
- Original company: Garnkirk and Glasgow Railway
- Pre-grouping: Caledonian Railway
- Post-grouping: London, Midland and Scottish Railway

Key dates
- 1 June 1831: Opened
- 5 November 1962: Closed
- 9 May 2005: Reopened

Passengers
- 2021/22: ▲96,136
- 2022/23: ▲0.135 million
- 2023/24: ▲0.173 million
- 2024/25: ▲0.181 million
- 2025/26: ▲0.209 million
Location
Notes
- Passenger statistics from the Office of Rail and Road

Gartcosh railway station serves the village of Gartcosh, North Lanarkshire, Scotland. The railway station is managed by ScotRail and is located on the Cumbernauld Line, 7 3/4 mi (12 km) northeast of Glasgow Queen Street (High Level) station.

The station was opened on 9 May 2005 by The Princess Royal. The station was built at a cost of over £3 million, provided by Strathclyde Passenger Transport and North Lanarkshire council, on the site of the previous Gartcosh station that closed in 1962.

== Services ==
=== 2017 ===
Monday to Saturday there are three trains per hour from Gartcosh to Glasgow Queen Street westbound and Cumbernauld eastbound with an hourly service continuing to Falkirk Grahamston. Two of the westbound services run via Queen St Low Level to Partick and Dalmuir over the North Clyde Line whilst the other (the service to/from Falkirk) terminates at Queen St High Level.

On Sundays there is an hourly service to Partick via Queen St LL and to Cumbernauld.

=== 2018/19 ===
From December 2018, a new half hourly Glasgow - Edinburgh via Cumbernauld and Falkirk Grahamston service started, replacing the hourly DMU service and taking over the existing EMU service between Springburn and Cumbernauld. The service uses new Class 385 EMUs.

Preceding station	National Rail	Following station
Stepps	ScotRail; Cumbernauld Line	Greenfaulds

== Facilities ==
The station has a car park, but is not permanently staffed.
