= East Dunbartonshire Council elections =

Local government elections in East Dunbartonshire, Scotland

East Dunbartonshire Council in Scotland holds elections every five years, previously holding them every four years from its creation as a single-tier authority in 1995 to 2007.

== Council elections ==
Year	SNP	Liberal Democrats	Labour	Conservative	EDIA	Independent
1995	0	9	15	2	0	0
1999 (Note: New ward boundaries.)	0	10	11	3	0	0
2003	0	12	9	3	0	0
2007 (Note: Change to single transferable vote system and new ward boundaries.)	8	3	6	5	2	0
2012	8	3	8	2	2	1
2017 (Note: New ward boundaries.)	7	6	2	6	0	1
2022	8	6	4	3	0	1

== Results maps ==
1999 results map

2003 results map

2017 results map

2022 results map

== By-elections ==
=== 2007-2012 ===
Bishopbriggs South By-Election 4 June 2009
Party	Candidate	FPv%	Count			
Party	Candidate	FPv%	1	2	3	4
Labour	Alan Moir	39.2	1,401	1,479	1,784	1,787
SNP	Denis Johnston	23.4	837	949	1,223	
Liberal Democrats	Alastair McPhee	20.6	736	928		
Conservative	Matt Ford	14.0	500			
Scottish Socialist	Mark Callaghan	2.7	96			
Labour hold						
Valid: 5,196 Spoilt: 65 Quota: 2,599 Turnout: 5,261

Bearsden South By-Election 10 December 2009
Party	Candidate	FPv%	Count		
Party	Candidate	FPv%	1	2	3
Liberal Democrats	Ashay Ghai	29.4	1,110	1,381	1,770
Conservative	Rachel Higgins	33.4	1,261	1,306	1,499
SNP	Fiona McLeod	20.7	783	972	
Labour	Manjinder Shergill	16.6	626		
Liberal Democrats gain from Conservative					
Valid: 3,780 Spoilt: 150 Quota: 1,891 Turnout: 3,930

=== 2012-2017 ===
Campsie and Kirkintilloch North By-Election 14 September 2012
Party	Candidate	FPv%	Count				
Party	Candidate	FPv%	1	2	3	4	5
Labour	Gemma Welsh	30.8	851	860	874	939	1,146
SNP	Billy Hutchinson	26.9	743	762	767	845	1,044
Liberal Democrats	Susan Murray	25.0	693	702	740	788	
Independent	Brian Reid	9.9	274	284	318		
Conservative	Alisdair Sinclair	5.1	141	143			
Green	Ross Greer	2.3	65				
Labour gain from EDIA							
Valid: 2,767 Spoilt: 28 Quota: 1,384 Turnout: 2,795

=== 2022-2027 ===
Kirkintilloch East and North and Twechar By-Election 13 February 2025
Party	Candidate	FPv%	Count							
Party	Candidate	FPv%	1	2	3	4	5	6	7	8
Labour	Aidan Marshall	30.2	958	959	967	983	999	1,040	1,255	1,691
Liberal Democrats	Marthos Christoforou	21.3	677	679	684	712	765	878	1,029	
SNP	Serina Marshall	22.9	726	727	751	812	815	855		
Reform	Bruce Hampton	15.0	476	480	489	494	517			
Conservative	Satbir Kaur Gill	4.1	131	133	134	136				
Green	Elizabeth Rowan	4.0	128	128	133					
Alba	Eamonn Gallagher	2.0	63	67						
Sovereignty	Alan McManus	0.6	18							
Labour gain from Liberal Democrats										
Valid: 3,177 Spoilt: 51 Quota: 1,589 Turnout: 3,228

Bearsden South By-Election 27 January 2026
Party	Candidate	FPv%	Count				
Party	Candidate	FPv%	1	2	3	4	5
Liberal Democrats	Ben Langmead	38.1	1,744	1,749	1,826	1,940	2,333
SNP	Lynne Gibbons	17.2	789	791	804	948	1,057
Reform	John Fairlie	15.5	709	716	787	793	836
Labour	Lorna Dougall	14.2	650	650	678	746	
Green	Emma Sheppard	8.1	371	378	384		
Conservative	Duncan Evans	6.2	283	287			
Scottish Family	Liam McKechnie	0.8	35				
Liberal Democrats gain from Conservative							
Valid: 4,581 Spoilt: 26 Quota: 2,291 Turnout: 4,607
