= Mid Dunbartonshire =

UK Parliament constituency (since 2024)

- County constituency for the House of Commons
- Interactive map of boundaries from 2024
- Boundary of Mid Dunbartonshire in Scotland
- Subdivision: East Dunbartonshire
- Electorate: 75,099 (March 2020)
- Major settlements: Bearsden, Bishopbriggs, Kirkintilloch, Lenzie, Milngavie

Current constituency
- Created: 2024
- Member of Parliament: Susan Murray (Liberal Democrats)
- Seats: One
- Created from: East Dunbartonshire

Mid Dunbartonshire is a constituency of the House of Commons in the UK Parliament. Further to the completion of the 2023 review of Westminster constituencies, it was first contested at the 2024 general election, when it was won by Susan Murray of the Liberal Democrats.

== Boundaries ==
Map of boundaries from 2024

The constituency comprises the following wards of the East Dunbartonshire council area:

- In full: Milngavie, Bearsden North, Bearsden South, Bishopbriggs North and Campsie, Bishopbriggs South.
- In part: Lenzie and Kirkintilloch South (virtually all the electorate), Kirkintilloch East and North and Twechar (small part comprising the northern areas of the town of Kirkintilloch).

It covers virtually all of the former East Dunbartonshire constituency, together with a small part of the Cumbernauld, Kilsyth and Kirkintilloch East constituency (renamed Cumbernauld and Kirkintilloch), including Lennoxtown and Milton of Campsie.

== Constituency profile ==
Electoral Calculus characterises the seat as "Strong Left", with left-wing economic and socially liberal views, high levels of university education and an internationalist outlook including strong opposition to Brexit.

== Members of Parliament ==
Election	Member	Party
2024	Susan Murray	Scottish Liberal Democrats

== Election results ==
=== Elections in the 2020s ===
2024 general election: Mid Dunbartonshire
Party	Candidate	Votes	%	±%
Liberal Democrats	Susan Murray	22,349	42.4	+7.9
SNP	Amy Callaghan	12,676	24.0	−13.9
Labour	Lorna Dougall	10,993	20.8	+11.4
Conservative	Alix Mathieson	2,452	4.6	−11.0
Reform	David McNabb	2,099	4.0	N/A
Green	Carolynn Scrimgeour	1,720	3.3	+1.7
Alba	Ray James	449	0.9	N/A
Majority		9,673	18.4	N/A
Turnout		52,738	71.7	−6.3
Registered electors		73,603		
Liberal Democrats gain from SNP		Swing	+10.9	

=== Elections in the 2010s ===
2019 notional result (Note: Estimate of the 2019 general election result as if the revised boundaries recommended under the 2023 boundary review were in place)
Party	Vote	%
SNP	22,179	37.9
Liberal Democrats	20,193	34.5
Conservative	9,118	15.6
Labour	5,520	9.4
Scottish Greens	916	1.6
Other (3 candidates)	626	1.1
Majority	1,986	3.4
Turnout	58,552	78.0
Electorate	75,099	
