= Cumbernauld and Kirkintilloch =

UK Parliament constituency (since 2005)

Coordinates: 55.957°N 4.038°W

- County constituency for the House of Commons
- Location of Cumbernauld and Kirkintilloch within Scotland
- Subdivision: East Dunbartonshire and North Lanarkshire
- Electorate: 70,579 (March 2020)
- Major settlements: Croy, Cumbernauld, Kilsyth, Kirkintilloch

Current constituency
- Created: 2005 (as Cumbernauld, Kilsyth and Kirkintilloch East)
- Member of Parliament: Katrina Murray (Labour)
- Created from: Cumbernauld and Kilsyth and Strathkelvin and Bearsden

Cumbernauld and Kirkintilloch is a constituency of the House of Commons of the Parliament of the United Kingdom. It was created for the 2005 general election, replacing Cumbernauld and Kilsyth and part of Strathkelvin and Bearsden. The seat has been represented since 2024 by Katrina Murray of Scottish Labour.

The constituency covers the north of the North Lanarkshire council area, and small eastern and northern part of the East Dunbartonshire council area. Under the 2023 review of Westminster constituencies the Boundary Commission for Scotland recommended new boundaries for the constituency and for it to be renamed from Cumbernauld, Kilsyth and Kirkintilloch East.

== Boundaries ==
Map of boundaries 2005–2024

Map of boundaries from 2024

=== 2005–2024 (Cumbernauld, Kilsyth and Kirkintilloch East) ===
Under the Fifth Review of UK Parliament constituencies, the boundaries were defined in accordance with the ward structure in place on 30 November 2004. Further to reviews of local government ward boundaries which came into effect in 2007 and 2017, but did not affect the parliamentary boundaries, the constituency comprised the following wards or part wards:

- The East Dunbartonshire Council wards of Bishopbriggs North and Campsie (part), Kirkintilloch East and North and Twechar (most), Lenzie and Kirkintilloch South (very small part); and
- The North Lanarkshire Council wards of Cumbernauld East, Cumbernauld North (most), Cumbernauld South, and Kilsyth.

The new town of Cumbernauld is approximately 15 miles north-east of Glasgow. This constituency brought together areas from North Lanarkshire and East Dunbartonshire councils. The western, mostly rural, areas including Lennoxtown, Milton of Campsie, Twechar and the Campsie Fells were joined in the east and south by eastern parts Kirkintilloch and the entire towns of Cumbernauld and Kilsyth. These two latter areas formed one constituency prior to the 2000 review.

=== 2024–present (Cumbernauld and Kirkintilloch) ===
Further to the 2023 review of Westminster constituencies, the newly named constituency comprises the following wards or part wards:

- The East Dunbartonshire Council wards of Kirkintilloch East and North and Twechar (most), Lenzie and Kirkintilloch South (very small part); and
- The North Lanarkshire Council wards of Cumbernauld East, Cumbernauld North (most), Cumbernauld South, Kilsyth, and Stepps, Chryston and Muirhead.

The boundary review resulted in the gain of Stepps, Chryston and Muirhead from Coatbridge, Chryston and Bellshill (renamed Coatbridge and Bellshill), partly offset by the transfer of Lennoxtown and Milton of Campsie to Mid Dunbartonshire.

== Members of Parliament ==
Election	Member	Party
2005	Rosemary McKenna	Labour
2010	Gregg McClymont	Labour
2015	Stuart McDonald	Scottish National Party
2024	Katrina Murray	Labour

== Election results ==
=== Elections in the 2020s ===
2024 general election: Cumbernauld and Kirkintilloch
Party	Candidate	Votes	%	±%
Labour	Katrina Murray	18,513	45.2	+18.1
SNP	Stuart McDonald	14,369	35.1	−16.9
Reform	Billy Ross	3,167	7.7	N/A
Conservative	Satbir Gill	1,939	4.7	−10.3
Green	Anne McCrossan	1,694	4.1	+3.9
Liberal Democrats	Adam Harley	1,294	3.2	−2.4
Majority		4,144	10.1	N/A
Turnout		40,976	58.2	
Labour gain from SNP		Swing	+17.5	

=== Elections in the 2010s ===
2019 notional result (Note: Estimate of the 2019 general election result as if the revised boundaries recommended under the 2023 boundary review were in place)
Party	Vote	%
SNP	25,084	52.0
Labour	13,079	27.1
Conservative	7,243	15.0
Liberal Democrats	2,691	5.6
Scottish Greens	115	0.2
Majority	12,005	24.9
Turnout	48,212	68.3
Electorate	70,579	

2019 general election: Cumbernauld, Kilsyth and Kirkintilloch East
Party	Candidate	Votes	%	±%
SNP	Stuart McDonald	24,158	52.8	+9.2
Labour	James McPhilemy	11,182	24.5	−9.4
Conservative	Roz McCall	7,380	16.1	−2.2
Liberal Democrats	Susan Murray	2,966	6.6	+3.8
Majority		12,976	28.3	+18.6
Turnout		45,716	69.3	+3.4
SNP hold		Swing	+9.3	

2017 general election: Cumbernauld, Kilsyth and Kirkintilloch East
Party	Candidate	Votes	%	±%
SNP	Stuart McDonald	19,122	43.6	−16.3
Labour	Elisha Fisher	14,858	33.9	+3.9
Conservative	Stephen Johnston	8,010	18.3	+10.4
Liberal Democrats	Rod Ackland	1,238	2.8	+0.6
UKIP	Carl Pearson	605	1.4	N/A
Majority		4,264	9.7	−22.2
Turnout		43,833	65.9	−7.7
SNP hold		Swing	−10.1	

2015 general election: Cumbernauld, Kilsyth and Kirkintilloch East
Party	Candidate	Votes	%	±%
SNP	Stuart McDonald	29,572	59.9	+36.1
Labour	Gregg McClymont	14,820	30.0	−27.2
Conservative	Malcolm MacKay	3,891	7.9	−0.4
Liberal Democrats	John Duncan	1,099	2.2	−7.3
Majority		14,752	29.9	N/A
Turnout		49,382	73.6	+9.3
SNP gain from Labour		Swing	+31.7	

2010 general election: Cumbernauld, Kilsyth and Kirkintilloch East
Party	Candidate	Votes	%	±%
Labour	Gregg McClymont	23,549	57.2	+5.4
SNP	Julie Hepburn	9,794	23.8	+1.6
Liberal Democrats	Rod Ackland	3,924	9.5	−5.4
Conservative	Stephanie Fraser	3,407	8.3	+1.3
Scottish Socialist	Willie O'Neill	476	1.2	−1.7
Majority		13,755	33.4	+3.8
Turnout		41,150	64.3	+3.9
Labour hold		Swing	+1.9	

=== Elections in the 2000s ===
2005 general election: Cumbernauld, Kilsyth and Kirkintilloch East
Party	Candidate	Votes	%	±%
Labour	Rosemary McKenna	20,251	51.8	
SNP	Jamie Hepburn	8,689	22.2	
Liberal Democrats	Hugh O'Donnell	5,817	14.9	
Conservative	James Boswell	2,718	7.0	
Scottish Socialist	Willie O'Neill	1,141	2.9	
Christian Vote	Patrick Elliott	472	1.2	
Majority		11,562	29.6	
Turnout		39,088	60.4	
Labour win (new seat)				
