= 2012 Scottish local elections =

- 3 May 2012

All 1,223 seats to 32 Scottish councils
- Turnout: 39.6% (▼13.2%)
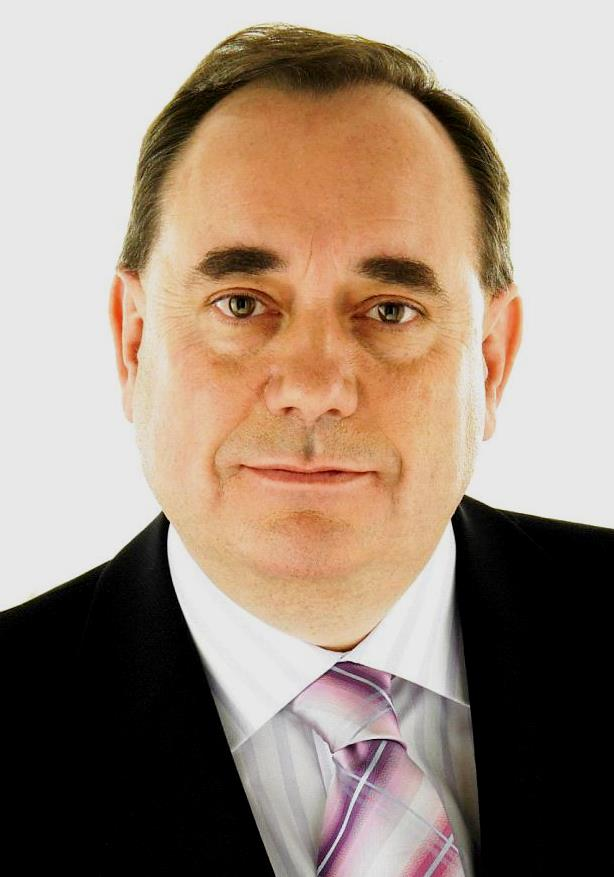

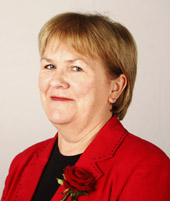

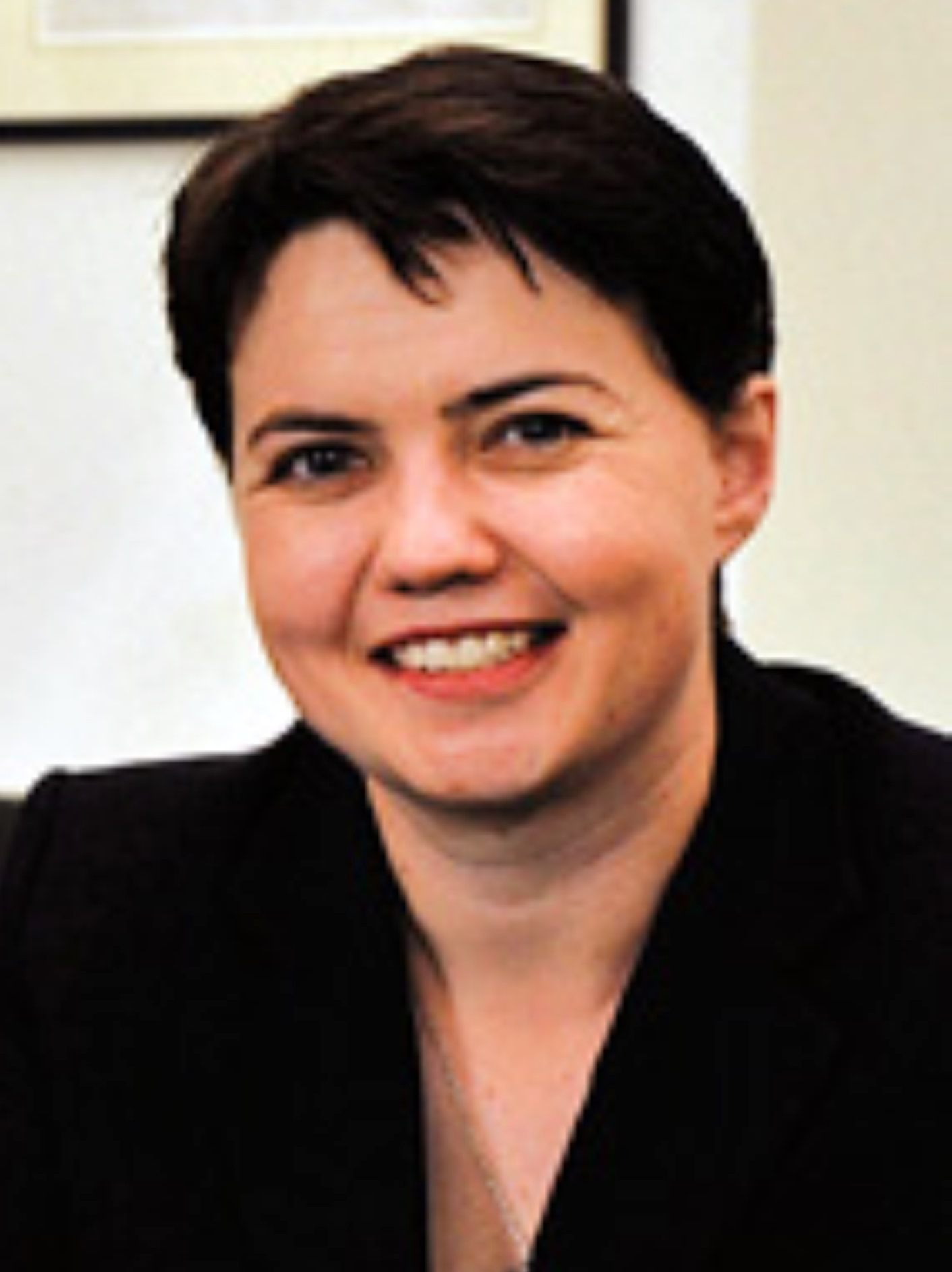

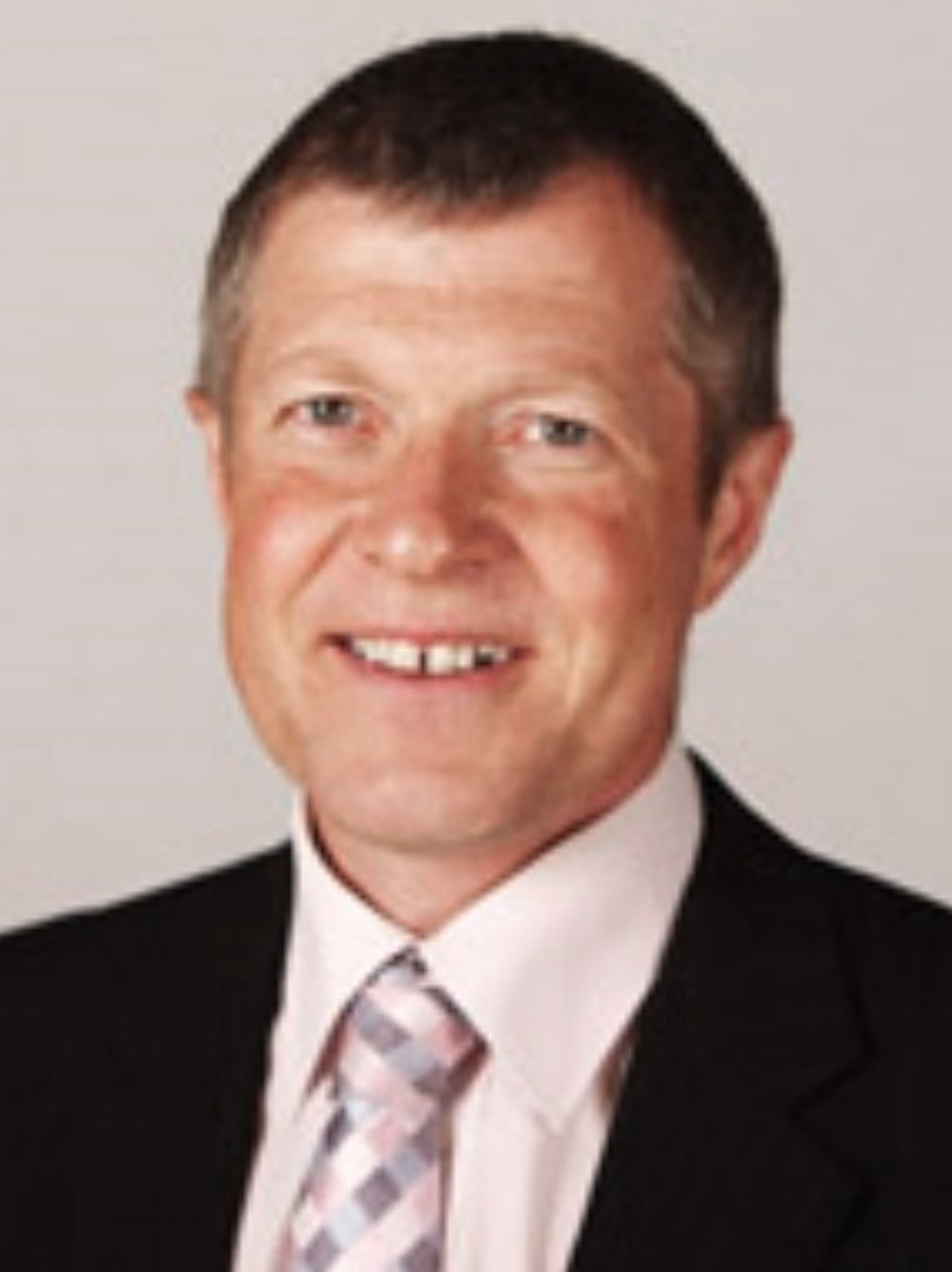
	First party	Second party
Leader	Alex Salmond	Johann Lamont
Party	SNP	Labour
Leader since	3 September 2004	17 December 2011
Last election	363 seats, 27.9%	348 seats, 28.1%
Seats won	425	394
Seat change	▲62	▲46
First preferences	503,233	488,703
First preferences (%)	32.33%	31.39%
Swing (pp)	▲4.48%	▲3.26%
	Third party	Fourth party
Leader	Ruth Davidson	Willie Rennie
Party	Conservative	Liberal Democrats
Leader since	4 November 2011	17 May 2011
Last election	143 seats, 15.6%	166 seats, 12.7%
Seats won	115	71
Seat change	▼28	▼95
First preferences	206,599	103,087
First preferences (%)	13.27%	6.62%
Swing (pp)	▼2.35%	▼6.05%

- Colours denote the party with the most seats

- Colours denote the party with largest share of first preference votes by ward

The 2012 Scottish local elections were held on 3 May 2012 in all 32 local authorities. The Scottish National Party (SNP) overtook Labour to win the highest share of the vote, and retained and strengthened its position as the party with most councillors. Labour also made gains, while the Liberal Democrats experienced meltdown, losing over half their seats and falling behind the Conservatives. For the first time since the introduction of the Single Transferable Vote system, the SNP won majority control of 2 councils, from no overall control. Labour also won majority control of 2 councils from no overall control, while retaining majority control over 2 councils.

Independent councillors retained majority control over the 3 island councils. The 23 other councils remained under no overall control.

== Background ==
The election was due to be held on 5 May 2011, but Scottish Ministers heeded the advice of the Gould Report and split the Holyrood and local elections - in order to avoid a repeat of the 2007 fiasco. These local elections were the second since the Single Transferable Vote (STV) was first introduced for the 2007 local government elections. This election was the first since the SNP won a majority in the Scottish Parliament. They were also the first local elections in Scotland since 1995 not to take place at the same time as a Scottish parliamentary election.

=== New eCounting system ===
In October 2010 a new company - Logica was awarded the contract for the vote counting system for the 2012 council elections, and since January 2011 testing has been under way to sort out many issues. On the 5 August 2011, A Dummy election was set up in Perth to test out new "eCounting" system, as part of robust test, in which 160,000 ballot papers run through the machine. This forms third stage of rigorous testing of the system in partition of these elections.

== Party performance ==
Both the SNP and Labour performed well, increasing both share of the vote and their numbers of councillors. The SNP gained control of two councils from No Overall Control: Angus and Dundee. Labour gained majority control over two councils, Renfrewshire and West Dunbartonshire, also from No Overall Control, and held on to their overall majority in both Glasgow and North Lanarkshire councils. The Conservatives lost significant ground, but did gain a seat in Argyll & Bute and managed to come third.

The Liberal Democrats continued to experience a political meltdown following on from the previous year's Scottish elections, losing 57% of their councillors. In the Edinburgh ward of Pentland Hills, Mike 'Professor Pongoo' Ferrigan, who dressed as a penguin to council meetings, received 444 first-preference votes, 74 more than the Liberal Democrat candidate, Stuart Bridges, and 122 more than the Green Party candidate. In Edinburgh, where the Liberal Democrats had previously been in a ruling coalition with the SNP, they lost 13 of their 16 seats. In the Fife Council ward of Buckhaven, Methil and Wemyss Villages, the party's candidate, Lois Lothian, received just 21 votes.

The Greens boosted their councillor numbers from 8 to 14, including doubling their representation in Edinburgh (where they topped the poll in two wards for the first time) and electing councillors for the first time to Stirling, Midlothian and Aberdeenshire local authorities (note: Cllr Martin Ford, re-elected in 2012 as a Green, won in 2007 as a Liberal Democrat).

The Scottish Socialist Party held its sole seat, that of Jim Bollan in West Dunbartonshire. Meanwhile, the UK Independence Party lost its sole councillor in Scotland on Fife Council. Independent councillors retained majority control over the three island councils (Na h-Eileanan Siar, Orkney and Shetland).

== Aftermath ==
Colours denote the winning party with outright control

Talks took place to decide who would control of the 23 remaining councils This resulted in Labour taking control of Fife, East and West Lothian, Inverclyde and South Lanarkshire and forming a grand coalition with the SNP in the City of Edinburgh and an anti-Conservative alliance in East Renfrewshire.

The SNP took control of Clackmannanshire, North Ayrshire and Perth and Kinross and became the largest party in controlling coalitions in Argyll and Bute, Highland, Midlothian, Scottish Borders and East Ayrshire. They also joined the Scottish Conservatives in a coalition arrangement in Dumfries and Galloway.

== Results ==
Summary of the 3 May 2012 Scottish council election results
Party	First-preference votes			Seats won		
Party	#	%	Swing (pp)	#	Net Gain	%
SNP	503,233	32.33	+4.48	425	+62	34.75
Labour	488,703	31.39	+3.26	394	+46	32.22
Conservative	206,599	13.27	−2.35	115	−28	9.40
Independents	183,329	11.78	+1.27	196	+12	16.03
Liberal Democrats	103,087	6.62	−6.05	71	−95	5.81
Green	36,000	2.31	+0.11	14	+6	1.14
UKIP	4,289	0.28	+0.22	0	±0	0.00
Scottish Socialist	4,183	0.27	−0.61	1	±0	0.08
Borders Party	3,755	0.24	+0.12	2	±0	0.16
Action to Save St John's Hospital	3,474	0.22	+0.03	0	−3	0.00
East Dunbartonshire Independent Alliance	2,973	0.19	−0.09	2	±0	0.16
Glasgow First	2,547	0.16	+0.16	1	+1	0.08
TUSC	2,485	0.16	+0.16	0	±0	0.00
Christian Party	2,344	0.15	+0.12	0	±0	0.00
All Scotland Pensioners Party	2,328	0.15	+0.08	0	±0	0.00
Cumbernauld Independent Alliance	1,894	0.12	+0.02	1	±0	0.08
Unionist	864	0.06	−0.09	0	±0	0.00
Perth Independent Candidates	805	0.05	+0.05	1	+1	0.08
Solidarity	787	0.05	−0.81	0	−1	0.00
Socialist Labour Party	714	0.05	+0.03	0	±0	0.00
East Kilbride Alliance	681	0.04	−0.03	0	±0	0.00
Liberal	595	0.04	−0.02	0	±0	0.00
National Front	369	0.02	+0.02	0	±0	0.00
Pirate Party	292	0.02	+0.02	0	±0	0.00
Christian Peoples Alliance	209	0.01	+0.01	0	±0	0.00
Communist Party of Britain	94	<0.01	+0.01	0	±0	0.00
Britannica	73	<0.01		0	±0	0.00
Official Monster Raving Loony Party	67	<0.01		0	±0	0.00
Total	1,556,773	100.00	±0.00	1,223	+1	100.00

Note: The net gain/loss and percentage change in number of votes relates to the result of the previous Scottish local elections on 3 May 2007. This differs from the table in the reference above which shows gain/loss relative to seats held at dissolution of Scotland's councils.

=== Analysis ===
Candidates elected on first preferences, by party (2012)
Party	Total elected	Elected on 1st prefs		
Party	Total elected	Total	%	% (2007)
Conservative	115	46	40.0	40.6
Labour	394	199	50.5	37.4
Liberal Democrats	71	20	28.2	21.7
SNP	425	185	43.5	56.5
Green	14	1	7.1	–
Independent	200	79	39.5	31.6
Other	4	2	50.0	14.3
Totals	1,223	532	43.5	39.7

Average first terminal transfer rates (2012) (Note: the first terminal transfer of a major party candidate in a ward, where all of the other parties still had a candidate in the count)
Transferred from	% non-transferable	% transferred to				
Transferred from	% non-transferable	Con	Lab	LD	SNP	Ind/Other
Conservative	33.6	–	8.0	32.4	8.3	17.6
Labour	47.8	5.8	–	13.2	16.5	16.7
Liberal Democrats	23.1	21.8	20.4	–	15.5	19.3
SNP	44.2	6.0	18.1	14.1	–	17.8
Green	20.4	5.1	19.2	19.9	18.3	17.0

== Councils ==
Council	2007 Result: Largest party (Parties in control)	Control before election (Change in control since May 2007, if different)	2012 Result: Largest party (Parties in control)	Details
Aberdeen City	Liberal Democrats (LD + SNP)	NOC (SNP + LD)	Labour (Lab + Con + Ind)	Details
Aberdeenshire	Liberal Democrats (LD + Con)		SNP (Con + LD + Ind)	Details
Angus	SNP (Ind + Con + LD + Lab)		SNP	Details
Argyll and Bute	Independent (Ind + SNP)	NOC (Independent minority)	Independent (Ind + SNP)	Details
Clackmannanshire	Labour (Lab minority)	NOC (SNP minority)	SNP (SNP minority)	Details
Dumfries and Galloway	Conservative (LD + SNP)		Labour (Lab minority)	Details
Dundee City	SNP (Lab + LD)	NOC (SNP minority)	SNP	Details
East Ayrshire	SNP (SNP minority)	(SNP + Con)	SNP (SNP + Con)	Details
East Dunbartonshire	SNP (Lab + Con)		Labour (Lab + LD + Con)	Details
East Lothian	Labour (SNP + LD)		Labour (Lab + Con)	Details
East Renfrewshire	Conservative (Lab + Con + Ind + LD)	NOC (Lab + SNP + Ind + LD)	Labour (Lab + SNP + Ind)	Details
City of Edinburgh	Liberal Democrats (LD + SNP)		Labour (Lab + SNP)	Details
Falkirk	Labour (Lab + Ind + Con)		Labour (Lab + Con + Ind)	Details
Fife	Labour (LD + SNP)		Labour (Lab minority)	Details
Glasgow City	Labour	NOC (Lab minority)	Labour	Details
Highland	Independent (Ind + SNP)}	NOC (Ind + LD + Lab)	Independent (SNP + LD + Lab)	Details
Inverclyde	Labour (Lab minority)		Labour (Lab minority)	Details
Midlothian	Labour (Lab minority)	Labour	Labour (SNP + Green + Ind)	Details
Moray	Independent (Ind + Con)		SNP (Ind + Con)	Details
Na h-Eileanan Siar	Independent		Independent	Details
North Ayrshire	Labour (Lab minority)		SNP (SNP minority)	Details
North Lanarkshire	Labour	Labour	Labour	Details
Orkney	Independent		Independent	Details
Perth and Kinross	SNP (SNP + LD)		SNP (SNP minority)	Details
Renfrewshire	Labour (SNP + LD)		Labour	Details
Scottish Borders	Conservative (Con + LD + Ind)		Conservative (SNP + Ind + LD)	Details
Shetland	Independent		Independent	Details
South Ayrshire	Conservative (Con + Lab + Ind)		Conservative (Con + Lab + Ind)	Details
South Lanarkshire	Labour (Lab + LD + Con)		Labour (Lab minority)	Details
Stirling	Labour (Lab minority)	NOC (SNP minority)	SNP (Lab + Con)	Details
West Dunbartonshire	Labour (SNP + Ind)		Labour	Details
West Lothian	Labour (SNP + Ind)		Labour (Lab minority)	Details

Name of party shows the largest group within each council. However, the party names in brackets identify members of a coalition leading the council. In some cases, the largest party is shown, but is not in charge of the council.

== Notes ==
Preceded by 2007 Scottish local elections	Scottish local elections	Succeeded by 2017 Scottish local elections
