= Bishopbriggs North and Campsie (ward) =

Local government ward of East Dunbartonshire

Location of the ward in East Dunbartonshire

Bishopbriggs North and Campsie is one of the seven wards used to elect members of the East Dunbartonshire Council. It elects four Councillors.

The ward was created in 2017 following a boundary review, when the council's wards were reduced in number from eight to seven – most of the Bishopbriggs North and Torrance ward of 2007 was combined with the majority of the Campsie & Kirkintilloch North ward (Clachan of Campsie, Lennoxtown and Milton of Campsie) – the parts of Bishopbriggs between the Croy Line railway tracks and the Bishopbriggs Burn were re-assigned to the Bishopbriggs South ward, and the parts of Kirkintilloch north of the Forth and Clyde Canal were re-assigned to Lenzie and Kirkintilloch South. The new ward's territory borders the North Lanarkshire and Stirling local authority areas at either end of the Campsie Fells. In 2020, the ward had a population of 19,323.

== Councillors ==
Election	Councillors			
2017	Paul Ferretti (SNP)	Mohrag Fischer (SNP)	Gary Pews (Liberal Democrats)	Bill Hendry (Conservative)
2022	Paul Ferretti (SNP)	Lynda Williamson (SNP)	Colette McDiarmid (Labour Co-op)	Bill Hendry (Conservative)

== Election results ==
=== 2022 election ===
2022 East Dunbartonshire Council election

Bishopbriggs North and Campsie – 4 seats
Party	Candidate	FPv%	Count						
Party	Candidate	FPv%	1	2	3	4	5	6	7
SNP	Paul Ferretti (Incumbent)	26.38%	2,130						
Labour	Colette McDiarmid	20.73%	1,674						
Conservative	Billy Hendry (incumbent)	18.52%	1,495	1,502.46	1,509.33	1,522.44	1,578.79	1,596.76	1,596.76
Liberal Democrats	Gary Pews (Incumbent)	15.23%	1,229	1,254.15	1,274.02	1,289.09	1,333.22	1,429.79	
SNP	Lynda Williamson	10.52%	849	1,223.28	1,228.63	1,268.23	1.292.69	1,592.85	1,823.72
Green	Elizabeth Rowan	5.08%	410	462.47	468.70	491.75	508.34		
Scottish Family	Paul Gallacher	2.03%	164	175.36	178.22	200.05			
Alba	Alan Harris	1.49%	121	135.51	136.22				
Electorate: 15,642 Valid: 8,072 Spoilt: 130 Quota: 1,615 Turnout: 52.4%

=== 2017 election ===
2017 East Dunbartonshire Council election

Bishopbriggs North and Campsie – 4 seats
Party	Candidate	FPv%	Count					
Party	Candidate	FPv%	1	2	3	4	5	6
Conservative	Billy Hendry (incumbent) †	30.27%	2,541					
SNP	Paul Ferretti	21.79%	1,829					
SNP	Mohrag Fischer	14.32%	1,202	1,228	1,356	1,498	1,587	1,793
Liberal Democrats	Gary Pews	11.40%	957	1,301	1,303	1,366	1,502	2,091
Labour	Gemma Welsh (incumbent) ††	14.18%	1,191	1,308	1,313	1,364	1,451	
Independent	Brian Reid	4.25%	357	451	454	499		
Green	Christopher Cotton	3.79%	318	341	348			
Electorate: TBC Valid: 8,395 Spoilt: 127 Quota: 1,680 Turnout: 54.7%

=== Notes ===
- † Sitting councillor for defunct Bishopbriggs North & Torrance ward – see 2012 East Dunbartonshire Council election#Bishopbriggs North and Torrance.
- †† Sitting councillor for defunct Campsie & Kirkintilloch North ward – see 2012 East Dunbartonshire Council election#By Elections since 2012.
