= 2022 East Dunbartonshire Council election =

2022 Scottish local government election

- 5 May 2022

All 22 seats to East Dunbartonshire Council 12 seats needed for a majority
	First party	Second party	Third party
Leader	Gordan Low	Vaughan Moody	Alan Moir
Party	SNP	Liberal Democrats	Labour
Leader's seat	Bishopbriggs South	Bearsden South	Bishopbriggs South
Last election	7 seats, 28.77%	6 seats, 15.04%	2 seats, 13.09%
Seats before	7	6	2
Seats won	8	6	4
Seat change	▲1	0	▲2
	Fourth party	Fifth party
Leader	Andrew Polson	Duncan Cumming
Party	Conservative	Independent
Leader's seat	Bearsden South	Bearsden North
Last election	6 seats, 26.45%	1 seat, 4.2%
Seats before	3	1
Seats won	3	1
Seat change	▼3	0
- Results by ward
Joint Council Leaders before election
Vaughan Moody & Andrew Polson
Lib Dems & Conservatives
Council Leader after election
Gordan Low
SNP

The East Dunbartonshire Council election of 2022 was held on 5 May 2022, the same day as the 31 other Scottish local government elections. Each ward elected three or four councillors using the single transferable vote system, a form of proportional representation used since the 2007 election and according to the Local Governance (Scotland) Act 2004.

The election saw the SNP remain as the largest group, increasing their representation by 1 seat to 8. The Lib Dems remained steady on 6, moving into second place, although former Depute Provost Gary Pews, who had succeeded the Conservative's Alan Brown as Provost following the latter's death in December 2021, lost his seat. Labour doubled their representation to 4 seats, moving into third place, while the Conservatives fell back to fourth place on 3. The independent councillor Duncan Cumming retained his seat.

== Election result ==
2022 East Dunbartonshire local election result
Party	Seats	Gains	Losses	Net gain/loss	Seats %	Votes %	Votes	+/−
SNP	8	1	0	▲1	36.4	30.38	13,842	▲1.61
Liberal Democrats	6	1	1	0	27.3	16.43	7,484	▲1.39
Labour	4	2	0	▲2	18.2	19.35	8,814	▲6.26
Conservative	3	0	3	▼3	13.6	18.26	8,318	▼8.19
Independent	1	0	0	0	4.5	8.61	3,924	▼3.39
Green	0	-	-	-	-	5.87	2,676	▲1.22
Alba	0	-	-	-	-	0.46	208	New
Scottish Family	0	-	-	-	-	0.36	164	New
Freedom Alliance (United Kingdom)	0	-	-	-	-	0.29	131	New

Note: "Votes" are the first preference votes. The net gain/loss and percentage changes relate to the result of the previous Scottish local elections on 4 May 2017. This may differ from other published sources showing gain/loss relative to seats held at dissolution of Scotland's councils.

=== Ward summary ===
2022 East Dunbartonshire Council election results by ward
Ward	%	Seats	%	Seats	%	Seats	%	Seats	%	Seats	%	Seats	Total
Ward	SNP		Lib Dem		Lab		Con		Ind		Others		Total
Milngavie	24.89	1	16.49	1	13.49	0	20.69	1	13.28	0	10.56	0	3
Bearsden North	19.05	1	12.42	1	9.48	0	14.98	0	38.30	1	5.75	0	3
Bearsden South	23.39	1	23.12	1	16.06	0	23.20	1	7.05	0	7.17	0	3
Bishopbriggs North and Campsie	36.90	2	15.23	0	20.73	1	18.52	1			8.60	0	4
Bishopbriggs South	36.92	1	12.45	1	27.25	1	17.27	0			5.76	0	3
Lenzie & Kirkintilloch South	33.23	1	17.36	1	20.98	1	20.34	0			7.99	0	3
Kirkintilloch East & North & Twechar	38.88	1	18.67	1	29.17	1	11.95	0			1.34	0	3
Total	30.38	8	16.43	4	19.35	3	18.26	1	8.61	1	6.98	0	22

== Ward results ==
=== Milngavie ===
- 2017: 1 x Liberal Democrat, 1 x SNP, 1 x Conservative
- 2022: 1 x Liberal Democrat, 1 x SNP, 1 x Conservative
- 2017–2022 Change: No Change

Milngavie – 3 seats
Party	Candidate	FPv%	Count				
Party	Candidate	FPv%	1	2	3	4	5
SNP	Jim Gibbons (incumbent)	24.89%	1,566				
Conservative	Alix Mathieson	20.69%	1,293	1,293.05	1,303.06	1,448.07	1,586.08
Liberal Democrats	Aileen Polson	16.49%	1,031	1,031.26	1,217.49	1,449.63	2,159.10
Labour	Thomas Shepherd	13.49%	869	869.37	1,100.79	1,364.99	
Independent	Julie Duncan	13.28%	830	830.29	948.69		
Green	Emma Sheppard	10.56%	660	661.59			
Electorate: 10,661 Valid: 6,249 Spoilt: 52 Quota: 1,563 Turnout: 59.1%

=== Bearsden North ===
- 2017: 1 x independent, 1 x Lib Dem, 1 x Conservative
- 2022: 1 x independent, 1 x Lib Dem, 1 x SNP
- 2017–2022 Change: 1 x SNP gain from Conservative

Bearsden North – 3 seats
Party	Candidate	FPv%	Count					
Party	Candidate	FPv%	1	2	3	4	5	6
Independent	Duncan Cumming (incumbent)	38.30%	2,645					
SNP	Calum Smith	19.05%	1,316	1,404.15	1,659.04	1,821.97		
Conservative	Duncan Evans	14.98%	1,035	1,263.02	1,269.45	1,370.05	1,373.07	
Liberal Democrats	Alan Reid	12.42%	858	1,119.34	1,199.81	1,569.10	1,605.73	2,378.56
Labour	Craig Muncie	9.48%	655	795.21	873.67			
Green	Neill Simpson	5.75%	397	478.56				
Electorate: 11,936 Valid: 6,909 Spoilt: 59 Quota: 1,727 Turnout: 58.4%

=== Bearsden South ===
- 2017: 1 x Liberal Democrat, 1 x SNP, 1 x Conservative
- 2022: 1 x Liberal Democrat, 1 x SNP, 1 x Conservative
- 2017–2022 Change: No Change

Bearsden South – 3 seats
Party	Candidate	FPv%	Count					
Party	Candidate	FPv%	1	2	3	4	5	6
SNP	Ian Gallagher	23.39%	1,490	1,497	1,521	1,783		
Conservative	Andrew Polson (incumbent)	23.20%	1,478	1,488	1,567	1,571	1,574.94	1,604.40
Liberal Democrats	Vaughan Moody (incumbent)	23.12%	1,473	1,487	1,590	1,669		
Labour	Lorna Dougall	16.06%	1,023	1,035	1,103	1,197	1,286.40	1,312.08
Green	Scott Ferguson	7.17%	457	469	491			
Independent	Sheila Mechan	4.74%	302	383				
Independent	Duncan Malcolm	2.31%	147					
Electorate: 11,099 Valid: 6,370 Spoilt: 50 Quota: 1,593 Turnout: 57.8%

=== Bishopbriggs North and Campsie ===
- 2017: 2 x SNP, 1 x Liberal Democrat, 1 x Conservative
- 2022: 2 x SNP, 1 xLabour, 1 x Conservative
- 2017–2022 Change: 1x Labour gain from Lib Dem

Bishopbriggs North and Campsie – 4 seats
Party	Candidate	FPv%	Count						
Party	Candidate	FPv%	1	2	3	4	5	6	7
SNP	Paul Ferretti (Incumbent)	26.38%	2,130						
Labour	Colette McDiarmid	20.73%	1,674						
Conservative	Billy Hendry (incumbent)	18.52%	1,495	1,502.46	1,509.33	1,522.44	1,578.79	1,596.76	1,596.76
Liberal Democrats	Gary Pews (Incumbent)	15.23%	1,229	1,254.15	1,274.02	1,289.09	1,333.22	1,429.79	
SNP	Lynda Williamson	10.52%	849	1,223.28	1,228.63	1,268.23	1.292.69	1,592.85	1,823.72
Green	Elizabeth Rowan	5.08%	410	462.47	468.70	491.75	508.34		
Scottish Family	Paul Gallacher	2.03%	164	175.36	178.22	200.05			
Alba	Alan Harris	1.49%	121	135.51	136.22				
Electorate: 15,642 Valid: 8,072 Spoilt: 130 Quota: 1,615 Turnout: 52.4%

=== Bishopbriggs South ===
- 2017: 1 x Labour, 1 x SNP, 1 x Conservative
- 2022: 1 x Labour, 1 x SNP, 1 x Liberal Democrat
- 2007-2012 Change: 1x Lib Dem gain from Conservative

Bishopbriggs South – 3 seats
Party	Candidate	FPv%	Count					
Party	Candidate	FPv%	1	2	3	4	5	6
SNP	Gordan Low (incumbent)	36.92%	2,241					
Labour	Alan Moir (incumbent)	27.25%	1,654					
Conservative	Catherine Brown	17.27%	1,048	1,061.87	1,076.92	1,091.22	1,119.07	
Liberal Democrats	Ben Rose	12.45%	756	865.69	918.89	938.25	1,235.73	1,962.71
Green	Jesper Bach	4.68%	284	662.76	682.89	751.42		
Alba	Eamonn Gallagher	1.08%	87	150.56	154.59			
Electorate: 12,340 Valid: 6,070 Spoilt: 70 Quota: 1,518 Turnout: 49.8%

=== Lenzie & Kirkintilloch South ===
- 2017: 1 x Liberal Democrat, 1 x SNP, 1 x Conservative
- 2022: 1 x Liberal Democrat, 1 x SNP, 1 x Labour
- 2017–2022 Change: 1 x Labour gain from Conservative

Lenzie & Kirkintilloch South – 3 seats
Party	Candidate	FPv%	Count					
Party	Candidate	FPv%	1	2	3	4	5	6
SNP	Gillian Renwick (incumbent)	33.23%	2,165					
Labour	Callum McNally	20.98%	1,367	1,474.19	1,484.45	1,809.77		
Conservative	Sandra Thornton (incumbent)	20.34%	1,325	1,331.44	1,344.44	1,360.89	1,377.44	
Liberal Democrats	Willie Paterson	17.36%	1,131	1,188.68	1,196.18	1,394.78	1,495.48	2,356.67
Green	Carolynn Scrimgeour	7.18%	468	744.04	752.02			
Freedom Alliance (UK)	James Watson	0.91%	59	62.71				
Electorate: 12,524 Valid: 6,515 Spoilt: 72 Quota: 1,629 Turnout: 52.6%

=== Kirkintilloch East & North & Twechar ===
- 2017: 1 x Labour, 1 x SNP, 1 x Liberal Democrat
- 2022: 1 x Labour, 1 x SNP, 1 x Liberal Democrat
- 2017–2022 Change: No Change

Kirkintilloch East & North & Twechar – 3 seats
Party	Candidate	FPv%	Count		
Party	Candidate	FPv%	1	2	3
SNP	Pamela Marshall	38.88	2,095		
Labour	Stewart MacDonald (incumbent)	29.17	1,572		
Liberal Democrats	Susan Murray (incumbent)	18.67	1,006	1,307.65	1,404.40
Conservative	Josephine MacLeod	11.95	644	663.61	692.82
Freedom Alliance (UK)	Alan McManus	1.34	72	180.75	199.13
Electorate: 12,318 Valid: 5,389 Spoilt: 87 Quota: 1,348 Turnout: 44.5%

== Aftermath ==
On 19 May 2022, a new SNP administration took office, with Cllr Gordan Low elected as Leader and Cllr Calum Smith appointed as Depute. Cllr Gillian Renwick was appointed as the first SNP Provost of East Dunbartonshire, and the first to represent a Kirkintilloch seat. Labour's Cllr Colette McDiarmid was elected as Depute Provost.

=== Kirkintilloch East & North & Twechar by-election ===
In the 2024 United Kingdom general election, Liberal Democrat councillor for Kirkintilloch East and North and Twechar (Ward 7), Susan Murray, was elected MP for Mid Dunbartonshire. Following this, she resigned from the council 30 November 2024, and a by-election for her replacement was held on 13 February 2025.

Kirkintilloch East & North & Twechar by-election (13 February 2025) - 1 seat
Party	Candidate	FPv%	Count							
Party	Candidate	FPv%	1	2	3	4	5	6	7	8
Labour	Aidan Marshall	30.2	958	959	967	983	999	1,040	1,255	1,691
SNP	Serina Marshall	22.9	726	727	751	812	815	855		
Liberal Democrats	Marthos Christoforou	21.3	677	679	684	712	765	878	1,029	
Reform	Bruce Hampton	15.0	476	480	489	494	517			
Conservative	Satbir Kaur Gill	4.1	131	133	134	136				
Green	Elizabeth Rowan	4.0	128	128	133					
Alba	Eamonn Gallagher	2.0	63	67						
Sovereignty	Alan McManus	0.6	18							
Electorate: 12,319 Valid: 3,177 Spoilt: 51 Quota: 1,589 Turnout: 26.2%

=== Bearsden South by-election ===
Bearsden South by-election (29th January 2026) - 1 seat
Party	Candidate	FPv%	Count				
Party	Candidate	FPv%	1	2	3	4	5
Liberal Democrats	Ben Langmead	38.1	1,744	1,749	1,826	1,940	2,333
SNP	Lynne Gibbons	17.2	789	791	804	948	1,057
Reform	John Fairlie	15.5	709	716	787	793	836
Labour	Lorna Dougall	14.2	650	650	678	746	
Green	Emma Sheppard	8.1	371	378	384		
Conservative	Duncan Evans	6.2	283	287			
Scottish Family	Liam Mckechnie	0.8	35				
Electorate: 10,785 Valid: 4,581 Spoilt: 26 Quota: 2,291 Turnout: 42.7

The by-election was called following the imprisonment of Conservative councillor, Andrew Polson.
