= Milngavie (ward) =

Local government ward of East Dunbartonshire

Location of the ward in East Dunbartonshire

Milngavie is one of the seven wards used to elect members of the East Dunbartonshire Council. It elects three Councillors. Its territory (which has not altered since its creation in 2007) consists of the entire burgh of Milngavie, and a sparsely populated hinterland to its north-west, bordering the West Dunbartonshire and Stirling local authority areas. In 2020, the ward had a population of 13,572.

== Councillors ==
Election	Councillors		
2007	Jim Gibbons (SNP)	Bill Binks (Conservative)	Eric Gotts (Liberal Democrats)
2012	Jim Gibbons (SNP)	Maureen Henry (Labour)	Eric Gotts (Liberal Democrats)
2017	Jim Gibbons (SNP)	Graeme McGinnigle (Conservative)	Jim Goodall (Liberal Democrats)
2022	Jim Gibbons (SNP)	Alix Mathieson (Conservative)	Aileen Polson (Liberal Democrats)

== Election results ==
=== 2022 election ===
2022 East Dunbartonshire Council election

Milngavie – 3 seats
Party	Candidate	FPv%	Count				
Party	Candidate	FPv%	1	2	3	4	5
SNP	Jim Gibbons (incumbent)	24.89%	1,566				
Conservative	Alix Mathieson	20.69%	1,293	1,293.05	1,303.06	1,448.07	1,586.08
Liberal Democrats	Aileen Polson	16.49%	1,031	1,031.26	1,217.49	1,449.63	2,159.10
Labour	Thomas Shepherd	13.49%	869	869.37	1,100.79	1,364.99	
Independent	Julie Duncan	13.28%	830	830.29	948.69		
Scottish Green	Emma Sheppard	10.56%	660	661.59			
Electorate: 10,661 Valid: 6,249 Spoilt: 52 Quota: 1,563 Turnout: 59.1%

=== 2017 election ===
2017 East Dunbartonshire Council election

Milngavie – 3 seats
Party	Candidate	FPv%	Count				
Party	Candidate	FPv%	1	2	3	4	5
Conservative	Graeme McGinnigle	27.69%	1,701				
Liberal Democrats	Jim Goodall	27.64%	1,698				
SNP	Jim Gibbons (incumbent)	22.38%	1,375	1,381	1,393	1,486	1,957
Labour	Maureen Henry (incumbent)	9.29%	571	624	684	796	838
SNP	Kate Waddell	7.68%	472	473	478	560	
Scottish Green	Gordon Masterton	5.32%	327	342	372		
Electorate: TBC Valid: 6,144 Spoilt: 98 Quota: 1,537 Turnout: 58.7%

=== 2012 election ===
2012 East Dunbartonshire Council election

Milngavie – 3 seats
Party	Candidate	FPv%	Count		
Party	Candidate	FPv%	1	2	3
Liberal Democrats	Eric Gotts (incumbent)	36.6	1,751		
SNP	Jim Gibbons (incumbent)	28.0	1,338		
Labour	Maureen Henry	20.0	955	1,177	1,283
Conservative	Bill Binks (incumbent)	14.6	696	866	889
Electorate: 10,289 Valid: 4,740 Spoilt: 42 Quota: 1,186 Turnout: 46.07%

=== 2007 election ===
2007 East Dunbartonshire Council election

Milngavie
Party	Candidate	FPv%	Count							
Party	Candidate	FPv%	1	2	3	4	5	6	7	8
SNP	Jim Gibbons	20.1	1,310	1,327	1,388	1,475	1,581	1,637		
Conservative	Bill Binks	18.8	1,230	1,234	1,277	1,305	1,372	1,436	1,436	1,742
Liberal Democrats	Eric Gotts	18.8	1,226	1,229	1,257	1,304	1,951			
Labour	Peter Ritchie	17.8	1,161	1,175	1,217	1,263	1,336	1,400	1,400	
Liberal Democrats	Fiona Risk	14.1	919	924	962	1,051				
EDIA	Pat Ryan	4.7	308	314						
Scottish Green	Emma Sheppard	4.7	307	319	364					
Scottish Socialist	Bill Newman	1.1	71							
Electorate: 10,124 Valid: 6,532 Spoilt: 61 Quota: 1,634 Turnout: 65.12%
