= 2017 East Dunbartonshire Council election =

2017 Scottish local government election

- 4 May 2017

All 22 seats to East Dunbartonshire Council 12 seats needed for a majority
	First party	Second party	Third party
Leader	Ian Mackay	Andrew Polson	Vaughan Moody
Party	SNP	Conservative	Liberal Democrats
Leader's seat	Bearsden North (lost re-election)	Bearsden South	Bearsden South
Last election	8 seats, 33.3%	2 seats, 8.3%	3 seats, 12.5%
Seats before	8	2	3
Seats won	7	6	6
Seat change	▼1	▲4	▲3
	Fourth party	Fifth party
Leader	Rhondda Geekie	Duncan Cumming
Party	Labour	Independent
Leader's seat	Lenzie & Kirkintilloch South (lost re-election)	Bearsden North
Last election	8 seats, 33.3%	1 seat, 4.2%
Seats before	8	1
Seats won	2	1
Seat change	▼6	0
- Results by ward
Council Leader before election
Rhondda Geekie
Labour
Council Leader after election
Gordan Low
SNP

2017 Elections to East Dunbartonshire Council were held on Thursday 4 May, the same day as the 31 other local authorities in Scotland. The election used seven wards created under the Local Governance (Scotland) Act 2004, a reduction of one from 2012, with 22 Councillors being elected, 2 fewer overall. Each ward elected either 3 or 4 members, using the STV electoral system.

The election saw the Scottish National Party elected as the largest group with 7 seats, replacing Labour, which lost all but 2 seats to form the fourth largest group. The Scottish Conservative and Unionist Party gained 4 seats to achieve their highest ever number of councillors, while the Scottish Liberal Democrats gained 3 seats. The Independent councillor Duncan Cumming retained his seat.

Labour councillor Rhondda Geekie, leader of the council since 2007, lost her seat, as did the SNP Group Leader, Ian Mackay.

== Election result ==
East Dunbartonshire local election result 2017
Party	Seats	Gains	Losses	Net gain/loss	Seats %	Votes %	Votes	+/−
SNP	7	0	1	-1	31.8	28.77	13,540	+0.47
Conservative	6	4	0	+4	27.3	26.45	12,445	+11.05
Liberal Democrats	6	3	0	+3	27.3	15.04	7,076	+0.14
Labour	2	0	6	-6	9.1	13.09	6,159	-15.21
Independent	1	-	-	-	4.5	12.00	5,649	+5.9
Green	0	-	-	-	-	4.65	2,187	+3.95

Note: "Votes" are the first preference votes. The net gain/loss and percentage changes relate to the result of the previous Scottish local elections on 3 May 2012. This may differ from other published sources showing gain/loss relative to seats held at dissolution of Scotland's councils.

== Ward results ==
=== Milngavie ===
- 2012: 1 x Liberal Democrat, 1 x SNP, 1 x Labour
- 2017: 1 x Liberal Democrat, 1 x SNP, 1 x Conservative
- 2012-2017 Change: 1 x Conservative gain from Labour

Milngavie – 3 seats
Party	Candidate	FPv%	Count				
Party	Candidate	FPv%	1	2	3	4	5
Conservative	Graeme McGinnigle	27.69%	1,701				
Liberal Democrats	Jim Goodall	27.64%	1,698				
SNP	Jim Gibbons (incumbent)	22.38%	1,375	1,381	1,393	1,486	1,957
Labour	Maureen Henry (incumbent)	9.29%	571	624	684	796	838
SNP	Kate Waddell	7.68%	472	473	478	560	
Green	Gordon Masterton	5.32%	327	342	372		
Electorate: TBC Valid: 6,144 Spoilt: 98 Quota: 1,537 Turnout: 58.7%

=== Bearsden North ===
- 2012: 1 x Independent, 1 x Lib Dem, 1 x SNP
- 2017: 1 x Independent, 1 x Lib Dem, 1 x Conservative
- 2012-2017 Change: 1 x Conservative gain from SNP

Bearsden North – 3 seats
Party	Candidate	FPv%	Count				
Party	Candidate	FPv%	1	2	3	4	5
Independent	Duncan Cumming (incumbent)	33.23%	2,338				
Conservative	Sheila Mechan	20.78%	1,462	1,635	1,650	1,693	1,780
Liberal Democrats	Rosie O'Neil	17.97%	1,264	1,449	1,538	1,716	2,415
SNP	Ian Mackay (incumbent)	18.15%	1,277	1,343	1,496	1,588	
Labour	Eunis Jassemi-Zargani	5.39%	379	411	469		
Green	Erin Crawley	4.48%	315	355			
Electorate: TBC Valid: 7,035 Spoilt: 69 Quota: 1,759 Turnout: 62.1%

=== Bearsden South ===
- 2012: 1 x Liberal Democrat, 1 x SNP, 1 x Labour
- 2017: 1 x Liberal Democrat, 1 x SNP, 1 x Conservative
- 2012-2017: Con gain one seat from Lab

Bearsden South – 3 seats
Party	Candidate	FPv%	Count					
Party	Candidate	FPv%	1	2	3	4	5	6
Conservative	Andrew Polson	27.96%	1,859					
Liberal Democrats	Vaughan Moody (incumbent)	21.62%	1,437	1,519	1,660	2,019		
SNP	Denis Johnston	18.13%	1,205	1,207	1,420	1,547	1,597	1,973
Independent	Alan Oliver	13.19%	877	919	995	1,123	1,250	
Labour	Manjinder Shergill (incumbent)	10.38%	690	711	815			
Green	Scott Ferguson	8.72%	580	585				
Electorate: TBC Valid: 6,648 Spoilt: 50 Quota: 1,663 Turnout: 61.7%

=== Bishopbriggs North and Campsie ===
- 2017: 2 x SNP, 1 x Liberal Democrat, 1 x Conservative
- 2012-2017 Change: New Ward

Bishopbriggs North and Campsie – 4 seats
Party	Candidate	FPv%	Count					
Party	Candidate	FPv%	1	2	3	4	5	6
Conservative	Billy Hendry (incumbent) †	30.27%	2,541					
SNP	Paul Ferretti	21.79%	1,829					
SNP	Mohrag Fischer	14.32%	1,202	1,228	1,356	1,498	1,587	1,793
Liberal Democrats	Gary Pews	11.40%	957	1,301	1,303	1,366	1,502	2,091
Labour	Gemma Welsh (incumbent) ††	14.18%	1,191	1,308	1,313	1,364	1,451	
Independent	Brian Reid	4.25%	357	451	454	499		
Green	Christopher Cotton	3.79%	318	341	348			
Electorate: TBC Valid: 8,395 Spoilt: 127 Quota: 1,680 Turnout: 54.7%

=== Notes ===
- † Sitting councillor for defunct Bishopbriggs North & Torrance ward – see 2012 East Dunbartonshire Council election#Bishopbriggs North and Torrance.
- †† Sitting councillor for defunct Campsie & Kirkintilloch North ward – see 2012 East Dunbartonshire Council election#By Elections since 2012.

=== Bishopbriggs South ===
- 2012: 2 x Labour, 1 x SNP
- 2017: 1 x Labour, 1 x SNP, 1 x Conservative
- 2007-2012 Change: 1 x Conservative gain from Labour

Bishopbriggs South – 3 seats
Party	Candidate	FPv%	Count					
Party	Candidate	FPv%	1	2	3	4	5	6
Conservative	Alan Brown	26.74%	1,631					
SNP	Gordan Low (incumbent)	24.05%	1,467	1,470	1,536			
Labour	Alan Moir (incumbent)	16.27%	992	1,011	1,062	1,062	1,303	2,280
Labour	Ian Elrick	14.72%	898	926	996	996	1,194	
SNP	Irene Mackay	13.76	839	840	883	892		
Green	Connor Boyd	4.46%	272	281				
Electorate: TBS Valid: 6,099 Spoilt: 166 Quota: 1,525 Turnout: 50.3%

=== Lenzie & Kirkintilloch South ===
- 2012: 1 x Labour, 1 x SNP, 1 x Conservative
- 2017: 1 x Liberal Democrat, 1 x SNP, 1 x Conservative
- 2012-2017 Change: 1 x Liberal Democrat gain from Labour

Lenzie & Kirkintilloch South – 3 seats
Party	Candidate	FPv%	Count							
Party	Candidate	FPv%	1	2	3	4	5	6	7	8
Conservative	Sandra Thornton	24.55%	1,634	1,641	1,716					
SNP	Gillian Renwick (incumbent)	22.52%	1,499	1,576	1,611	1,612	2,093			
Liberal Democrats	Rod Ackland	12.09%	805	847	896	914	928	989	1,342	1,825
Independent	Sandy Taylor	12.19%	811	841	1,037	1,049	1,070	1,180	1,298	
Labour	Rhondda Geekie (incumbent)	10.94%	728	758	777	783	797	859		
SNP	Martin Robertson	7.59%	505	543	552	552				
Independent	Alisdair Sinclair	6.23%	415	431						
Green	Carolynn Scrimgeour	3.89%	259							
Electorate: TBC Valid: 6,656 Spoilt: 103 Quota: 1,665 Turnout: 56.1%

=== Kirkintilloch East & North & Twechar ===
- 2012: 1 x Labour, 1 x EDIA, 1 x SNP
- 2017: 1 x Labour, 1 x SNP, 1 x Liberal Democrat
- 2012-2017 Change: 1 x Liberal Democrat gain from EDIA

Kirkintilloch East & North & Twechar – 3 seats
Party	Candidate	FPv%	Count					
Party	Candidate	FPv%	1	2	3	4	5	6
SNP	John Jamieson (incumbent)	19.80%	1,115	1,132	1,144	1,872		
Labour	Stewart MacDonald (incumbent)	19.33%	1,089	1,101	1,241	1,269	1,366	1,645
Liberal Democrats	Susan Murray	16.25%	915	931	1,183	1,215	1,281	1,678
Independent	Willie Paterson	15.11%	851	871	1,028	1,053	1,185	
SNP	Pamela Marshall	14.29%	805	849	858			
Conservative	Alison Lothian	13.16%	741	741				
Green	Emma Sheppard	2.06%	116					
Electorate: TBC Valid: 5,632 Spoilt: 119 Quota: 1,409 Turnout: 47.9%

== Aftermath ==
Following the election, the Conservative and LibDem groups, who together formed a majority on the council, combined to secure the civic offices and various external appointments, the position of Provost being filled by Conservative Councillor Alan Brown and Depute Provost by LibDem Councillor Gary Pews. However, with the 2017 general election just weeks away, the two groups abstained on each other's nominations for the political posts, allowing the SNP to form a minority administration with Cllr Gordan Low as Leader and Cllr Gillian Renwick as Depute.

Thereafter, the Conservative and LibDem groups continued to vote together, and matters came to a head when a revised redundancy policy was pushed through against the opposition of the SNP administration. After a motion by the council leader calling for the policy to be withdrawn was rejected by Conservative and LibDem councillors, the administration stood down on 21 December 2017.

For the next few months the council functioned without an official administration, and then on 20 March 2018 Conservative Leader Councillor Andrew Polson and Lib Dem Leader Vaughan Moody were elected as Co-Leaders of the new Joint Administration, a first in East Dunbartonshire. Shortly thereafter the new redundancy policy was suspended in the face of potential industrial action.

== Post Election Changes ==
- On 13 November 2021, Bishopbriggs South Conservative councillor, Provost Alan Brown, died suddenly, being succeeded as Provost on 16 December 2021 by his Depute, Bishopbriggs North and Campsie LibDem councillor, Gary Pews. Both the former Provost's seat and the Depute Provost's position were left unfilled for the remainder of the council term. Provost Pews subsequently lost his seat at the 2022 council election.
- On 4 January 2022, Bearsden North councillor, Sheila Mechan, announced her resignation from the Conservative group, citing differences with her values at UK, Scottish and Association level, and served out the remainder of the council term as an independent, before standing unsuccessfully in Bearsden South at the 2022 council election.
