= Alan Reid (politician) =

British politician (born 1954)

Member of Parliament for Argyll and Bute
- In office 7 June 2001 – 30 March 2015
- Preceded by: Ray Michie
- Succeeded by: Brendan O'Hara

Personal details
- Born: 7 August 1954 (age 72) Ayr, Scotland
- Party: Liberal Democrat
- Education: University of Strathclyde

Alan Reid (born 7 August 1954) is a Scottish Liberal Democrat politician who has been a councillor in the East Dunbartonshire ward of Bearsden North since 2022.

He was previously the Member of Parliament (MP) for Argyll and Bute from 2001 to 2015, when he lost his seat to the Scottish National Party (SNP) at the 2015 general election. He attempted unsuccessfully to regain the seat on three occasions.

== Background ==
Reid was educated at Ayr Academy and the University of Strathclyde where he gained a BSc in Mathematics. Prior to his election to the House of Commons he worked for the University of Glasgow as a computer project manager. He remains a member of the AUT (Association of University Teachers).

He was a councillor on Renfrew District Council from 1988 to 1996.

== Political career ==
=== Member of Parliament ===
Reid contested Paisley South in a 1990 by-election and the 1992 general election and Dumbarton in 1997, before being elected for Argyll and Bute in 2001.

In the 2010 Parliament, he served on the Scottish Affairs Committee. In the previous Parliament he was the Liberal Democrat spokesman for Northern Ireland Office and Scotland Office matters. He has also served as a Liberal Democrat whip.

During the MPs expenses scandal, The Daily Telegraph drew attention to Reid's claims of over £1500 for stays in B&B's within his own constituency. Reid argued overnight stays were necessary where ferry timetables made it impossible to return to his constituency home, and said he had successfully challenged initially rejected expense claims by explaining the geography of Argyll and Bute.

==== Subsequent electoral activity ====
At the 2016 Scottish Parliamentary elections, Reid stood for the constituency seat of Argyll and Bute, as well as being fifth on the Highlands and Islands regional list. On the constituency ballot, he took second place with 25.8% of the vote, increasing the Liberal Democrats' share by 13.6%. The Liberal Democrats retained their two constituency seats, so were not entitled to regional representation.

Reid re-contested Argyll and Bute at the 2017 snap general election, finishing third with 8,745 votes (18.2%), a decrease by 9.7%.

His share of the vote decreased a further 4% at the 2019 general election, taking a distant third place in the constituency.

Reid was the lead list candidate for the Liberal Democrats in the Highlands and Islands at the 2021 Scottish Parliamentary elections, as well as being the constituency candidate for Argyll and Bute. The Liberal Democrat vote share in the region fell from 13.3% at the 2016 elections to 11.2%. Reid's vote share in the constituency vote fell from 25.7% at the 2016 election to 20.5%, and he finished third in Argyll and Bute.

In November 2023, Reid was selected to contest Argyll, Bute and South Lochaber at the 2024 general election. This was a new constituency, following the boundary changes which took effect at the 2024 General Election. He polled 16.4% of the vote in the constituency at the election, a 2.3% increase in the vote share compared to the notional result for the constituency at the previous general election in 2019.

=== Local Government ===
==== Argyll and Bute Council ====
At the Scottish local government elections held In May 2017, Reid stood as a candidate for the 3 member Ward of Cowal (Ward 6) in Argyll and Bute Council. Reid finished in third place, behind William Blair (SNP) and Yvonne McNeilly (Scottish Conservative), and received 791 first preference votes (22.7% of votes cast). Reid was duly elected as a councillor for the Ward of Cowal. At the Scottish local government elections held in May 2022, Reid did not seek re-election for the Cowal ward, and was replaced as a Liberal Democrat councillor for the ward of Cowal by William Sinclair at the 2022 Scottish Local Government elections. Reid instead chose to be a candidate for the ward of Bearsden North in East Dunbartonshire Council.

==== East Dunbartonshire Council ====
For the 2022 Scottish local elections, Reid was announced as a candidate for Bearsden North in East Dunbartonshire. On 6 May 2022, he was elected in this 3-member ward alongside Calum Smith of the SNP and independent candidate Duncan Cumming. He finished fourth on the first round of voting with 12.42% of the vote (which was a fall in the vote share of 17.97% achieved by the previous Liberal Democrat candidate Rosie O'Neill, who was elected as a councillor for the ward at the 2016 Scottish Local Government Elections) and he was elected at the sixth stage of the voting process.

=== Scottish Parliament ===
Reid contested Argyll and Bute for the 2026 Scottish Parliament election where he placed second.

Parliament of the United Kingdom
Preceded by Ray Michie	Member of Parliament for Argyll and Bute; 2001–2015	Succeeded by Brendan O'Hara
