= Amy Callaghan =

Scottish politician, MP for East Dunbartonshire

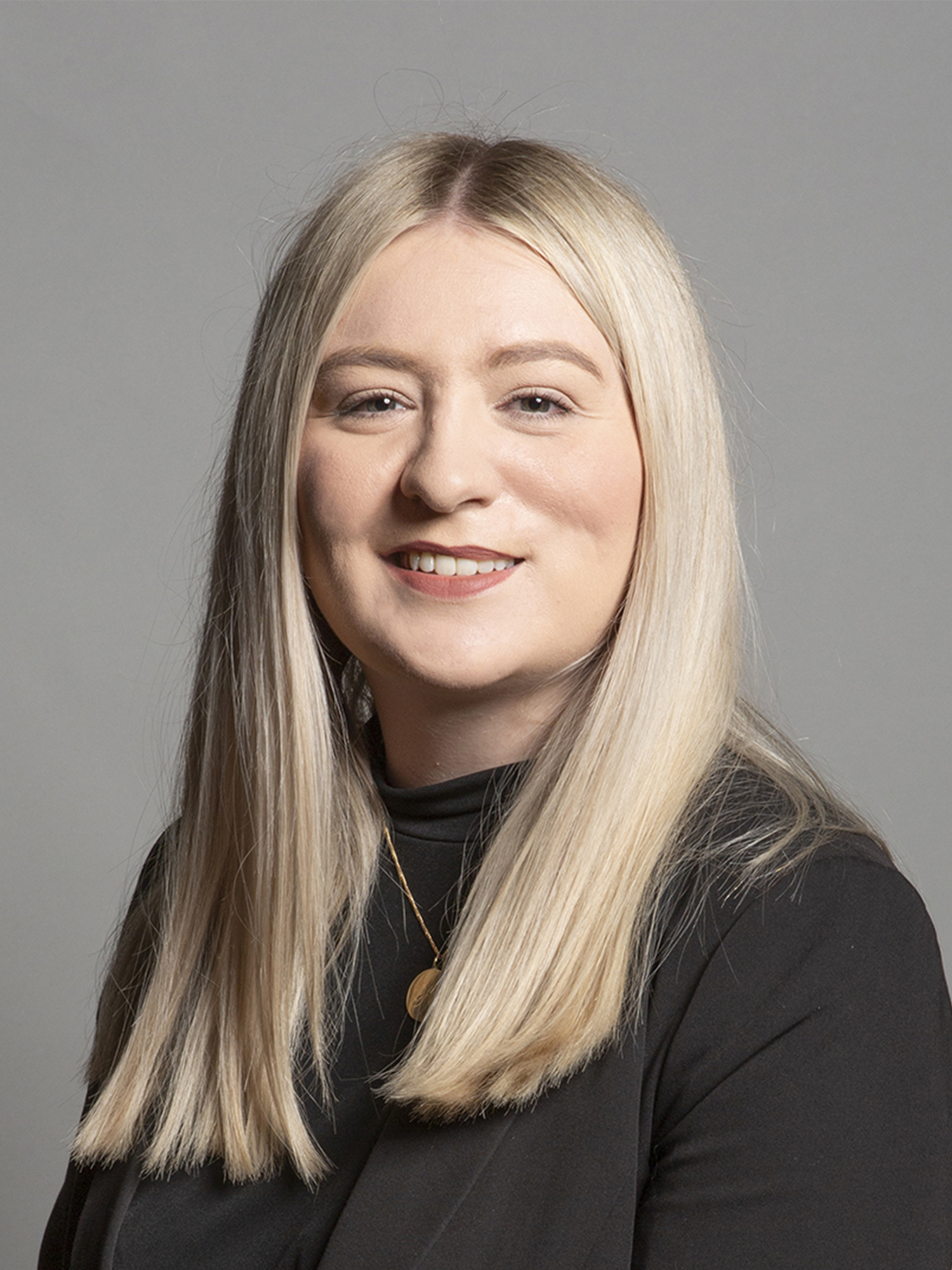
- Official portrait, 2020

SNP Spokesperson for Health in the House of Commons
- In office 4 September 2023 – 5 July 2024
- Leader: Stephen Flynn
- Preceded by: Martyn Day
- Succeeded by: Office not in use

SNP Spokesperson for Pensions and Intergenerational Affairs
- In office 8 January 2020 – 10 December 2022
- Leader: Ian Blackford
- Preceded by: Position established
- Succeeded by: Position abolished

Member of Parliament for East Dunbartonshire
- In office 12 December 2019 – 30 May 2024
- Preceded by: Jo Swinson
- Succeeded by: Constituency abolished

Personal details
- Born: 21 May 1992 (age 34)
- Party: Scottish National Party
- Education: University of Strathclyde

Amy Callaghan (born 21 May 1992) is a Scottish National Party (SNP) politician who served as the member of parliament (MP) for East Dunbartonshire from 2019 until 2024. She unseated the then Liberal Democrat leader, Jo Swinson, with a narrow majority of 149 votes or 0.3%, overturning her majority of 5,339 votes two years earlier. She was SNP Health spokesperson since and sat on the Health and Social Care Select Committee during her time in Parliament.

== Background ==
Callaghan attended primary and secondary school in Clydebank. She then attended the University of Strathclyde where she gained a BA Honours in politics. Before pursuing a political career, Callaghan worked in retail, hospitality and social care. In 2015 she began her work with the SNP as a Parliamentary Assistant in the Scottish Parliament for the former Scottish Government Minister for Environment and Land Reform, Aileen McLeod MSP. Following the 2016 Scottish Parliament election, Callaghan worked as Office Manager to Rona Mackay, the MSP for Strathkelvin and Bearsden.

Callaghan was diagnosed with melanoma when she was 19 and cites her experience of cancer as motivation to safeguard the NHS, saying, "It can never be jeopardised." She has been cancer-free since 2014.

In June 2020, Callaghan's office announced that she had suffered a brain haemorrhage and had undergone emergency neurosurgery. She spent four months recovering in the Physically Disabled Rehabilitation Unit at Queen Elizabeth University Hospital.

== Voluntary activities ==
Callaghan volunteered as a member of the Children's Panel for three years. Her voluntary activities have also supported the Teenage Cancer Trust, Young Lives Vs Cancer and the James Lind Alliance. She has co-authored research papers aimed at helping young people with cancer.

== Political career ==
Callaghan was selected as the Scottish National Party's candidate for the seat of East Dunbartonshire in September 2019. At the December 2019 general election, she won the seat, only narrowly beating the incumbent MP and Liberal Democrat leader, Jo Swinson.

On 7 January 2020, she was appointed as the SNP's spokesperson for pensions and intergenerational affairs. She made her maiden speech in parliament nine days later, during which she spoke about Scottish independence and protecting the NHS from the Tories.

In March 2020, she was selected as a member of the House of Commons Health and Social Care Select Committee. She was later discharged from the committee in June 2020 because of her brain haemorrhage and subsequent period of recovery.

During her recovery, Callaghan contributed to parliamentary debates virtually under processes that had been introduced to cope with the Covid-19 pandemic. However, following the removal of these processes, in February 2022 she returned to the House of Commons to deliver a speech in person. She described her return as "against doctor's orders".

Callaghan said she was travelling to London to raise the issue of a constituent who had suffered a stroke and was struggling with financial support. In what the Daily Mirror described as a "powerful return to Parliament", she pushed the work and pensions secretary, Thérèse Coffey, to commit to "revisiting the current levels of Universal Credit", claiming that the current level of support left people "barely getting by".

She has spearheaded the campaign for a proxy voting system. In January 2022, she wrote to then Leader of the House, Jacob Rees-Mogg, urging him to bring back proxy voting and virtual participation for those with long-term health conditions; Rees-Mogg subsequently suggested he was against the introduction of digital voting as MPs would not take votes "seriously" if they participated remotely.

On her physical return to the House of Commons in February 2022, Callaghan stepped up her calls for proxy voting during a speech in parliament and in a serious of interviews including with the Daily Record. In March 2022, she raised the issue again in the House of Commons, describing parliamentary procedures as "exclusionary".

On 7 June 2022, Callaghan was forced to withdraw her comment in the House of Commons for using the word "lying" in relation to the prime minister, Boris Johnson. She criticised Johnson for "partying, lying, amending the ministerial code, voter suppression, [and] watering down human rights". The deputy speaker, Nigel Evans, interrupted Callaghan and asked her to withdraw the word "lying", which she agreed to do.

In June 2022, Callaghan's colleague Patrick Grady was found to have committed "unwanted physical touching, with sexual intent" on a junior member of the SNP Westminster Group's staff. Following an investigation by an independent expert panel, Grady was suspended from the House of Commons for two sitting days. The expert group found that Grady's behaviour was a "significant breach" of the UK Parliament's sexual misconduct policy. However, for reasons set out in the report, the expert panel concluded that the suspension from parliament "should be short".

In a leaked recording of an SNP group meeting, Callaghan can be heard telling her fellow MPs, "I think we should be rallying together for this campaign, but also regardless of our position on Patrick's situation, we should be rallying together around him to support him at this time as well. I don't think we are very good as a party at supporting each other and I think we should be making sure that he feels supported at this point, so if we can all reach out to him, or do so if you feel able to, we should probably be doing that." Her comments had been greeted with applause from colleagues, but Callaghan later issued an apology, describing her remarks as "insensitive, poorly worded and misplaced". Then First Minister and SNP party leader, Nicola Sturgeon, subsequently told the Scottish Parliament, "I cannot comment on whether [the leaked recording] is an accurate overall reflection of the discussion, but what I have heard suggests that more concern was shown for the perpetrator of the behaviour than for its victim."

Callaghan launched East Dunbartonshire's first ever hospitality awards in June 2022 following what she described as a "a tough tough two years for the sector".

She chaired the All Party Parliamentary Group (APPG) on Children, Teenagers and Young Adults with Cancer.

Callaghan was promoted to the SNP's frontbench team as Health Spokesperson in September 2023. She also sat on the UK Parliament's Health and Social Care Select Committee.

During the 2024 UK general election, the East Dunbartonshire constituency was abolished, and Callaghan ran for re-election in the newly formed seat of Mid Dunbartonshire. She was unseated by Susan Murray of the Liberal Democrats, losing by a margin of 9,673 votes.

== Post-parliamentary career ==
Following her defeat at the 2024 UK General Election, Callaghan was appointed as a strategic political advisor at Chest Heart & Stroke Scotland.

== Campaigning and personal life ==
Callaghan campaigned to have VAT removed from sunscreen to reduce rates of melanoma. The campaign is supported by several leading cancer charities.

Callaghan has a small dog called Alfie.

Parliament of the United Kingdom
Preceded by Jo Swinson	Member of Parliament for East Dunbartonshire; 2019–2024	Constituency abolished
