= Stuart McDonald (Scottish politician) =

Scottish politician (born 1978)

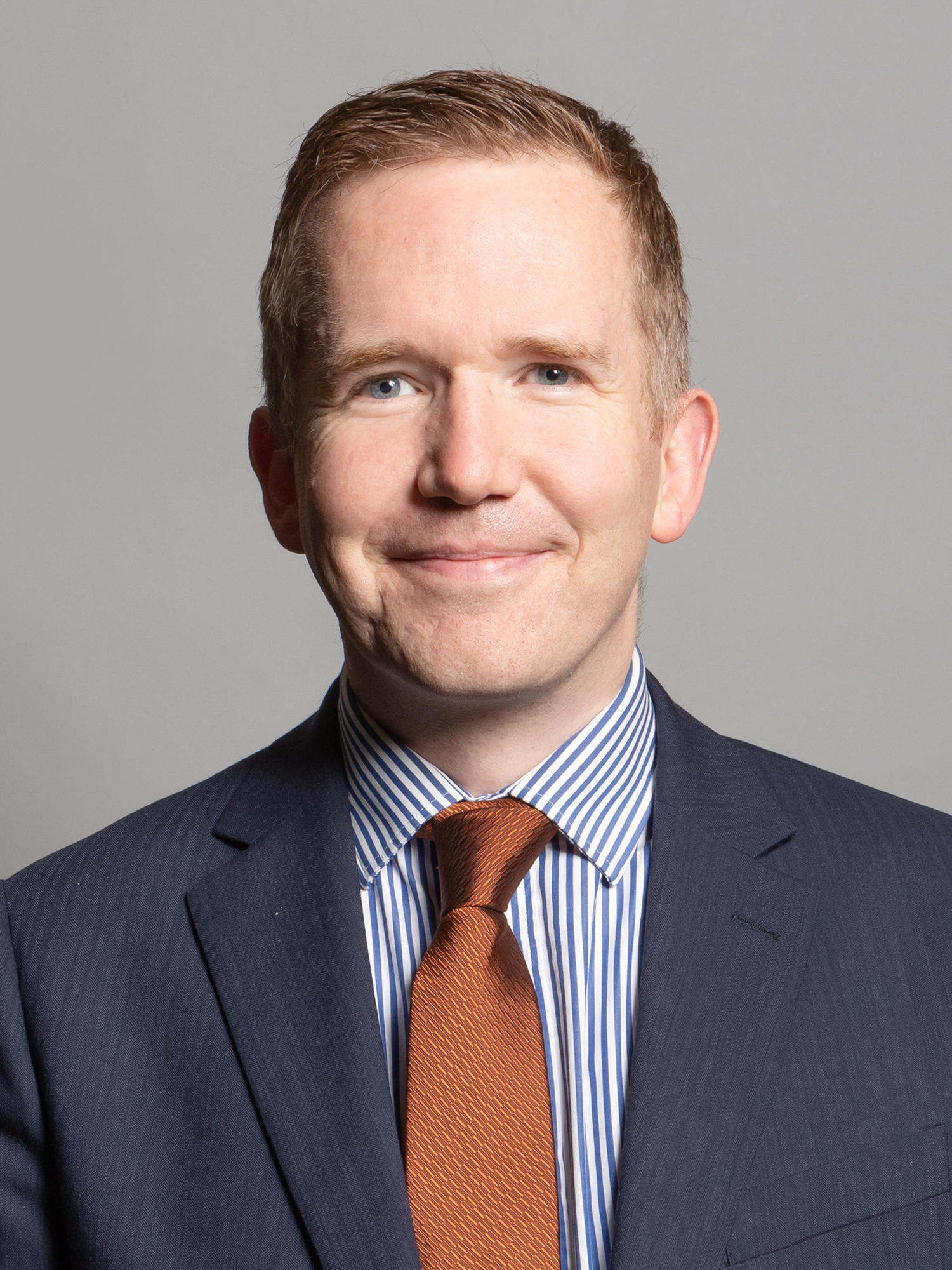
- Official portrait, 2020

SNP Justice and Immigration Spokesperson in the House of Commons
- In office 10 December 2022 – 4 September 2023
- Leader: Stephen Flynn
- Preceded by: Anne McLaughlin
- Succeeded by: Chris Stephens

SNP Home Affairs Spokesperson in the House of Commons
- In office 1 February 2021 – 10 December 2022
- Leader: Ian Blackford
- Preceded by: Joanna Cherry
- Succeeded by: Alison Thewliss

SNP Spokesperson for Immigration & Attorney General in the House of Commons
- In office 20 May 2015 – 1 February 2021
- Leader: Angus Robertson; Ian Blackford
- Preceded by: Office established
- Succeeded by: Anne McLaughlin (Immigration); Angela Crawley (Attorney General)

Member of Parliament for Cumbernauld, Kilsyth and Kirkintilloch East
- In office 7 May 2015 – 30 May 2024
- Preceded by: Gregg McClymont
- Succeeded by: Katrina Murray

Personal details
- Born: Stuart Campbell McDonald; 2 May 1978 (age 48) Glasgow, Scotland
- Party: Scottish National Party
- Education: University of Edinburgh

Stuart Campbell McDonald (born 2 May 1978) is a Scottish National Party (SNP) politician. He was the Member of Parliament (MP) for the Cumbernauld, Kilsyth and Kirkintilloch East constituency from 2015 to 2024. As a member of the House of Commons Home Affairs Select Committee, he served as the SNP Spokesperson for Justice and Immigration from 2022 to 2023. He served as the SNP Shadow Home Secretary from 2021 to 2022, and was the SNP Spokesperson on Immigration, Asylum and Border Control from 2015 to 2021.

He was first elected at the general election in May 2015, unseating incumbent Labour MP and Shadow Pensions Minister, Gregg McClymont. McDonald was the first SNP MP to represent Cumbernauld, Kilsyth and Kirkintilloch East (Margaret Bain was MP for Dumbartonshire East which covered Cumbernauld in the early-1970s), which covers parts of the North Lanarkshire and East Dunbartonshire council areas. Since 2023, he has served as Treasurer of the SNP.

== Early life and career before politics ==
Raised in Milton of Campsie, McDonald attended Kilsyth Academy between 1990 and 1996. He studied at the University of Edinburgh between 1996 and 2001, where he graduated from with a 2:1 Bachelor of Law (Hons), and a Diploma in Legal Practice. During his time at the University of Edinburgh, McDonald studied European and Comparative Law while on an ERASMUS year at the University of Leuven, between 1997 and 1998.

After graduating from university, McDonald worked as a Legal Trainee with Simpson and Marwick Solicitors, between October 2001 and July 2003, before he went to work for NHS Scotland's Central Legal Office, as a Solicitor – a position he held between July 2003 and November 2005. In November 2005, McDonald began working for the Immigration Advisory Service (IAS), as a Human Rights Solicitor – a job he held until November 2009, when he became a Senior Researcher at the Scottish Parliament.

He left his position at the Scottish Parliament in February 2013, to become a Senior Researcher for the pro-independence Scottish independence referendum campaign Yes Scotland, a position he held until the independence referendum on 18 September 2014. Immediately prior to his election, McDonald worked as a Parliamentary and Public Affairs Officer for the Coalition for Racial Equality and Rights, a Glasgow-based charity.

== Member of Parliament (2015–2024) ==
McDonald was officially selected unopposed as the SNP candidate, in December 2014, for the constituency which he has described as his "home patch". He went on to win Cumbernauld, Kilsyth and Kirkintilloch East in the 2015 UK Parliamentary Election with 59.9% of the vote, and a majority of 14,752.

Following his election, McDonald became the SNP's Spokesperson on Immigration, Asylum and Border Control, building on his previous experience as an immigration lawyer.

McDonald is gay and, on 19 May 2015, gathered with other LGBT SNP MPs, including his near-namesake Stewart McDonald, to campaign for a Yes vote in the Irish referendum on same-sex marriage, being held 3 days later.

McDonald is a Vice-Chair of the All-Party Parliamentary Group for Choice at the End of Life.

McDonald topped the backbenchers' ballot for private members bills in 2023 which allowed him to introduce 'The Neonatal Care Leave and Pay Act' later passed by parliament. This will provide paid leave of up to 12 weeks to parents of newborn babies who are taken into hospital for a week or more before they reach their 28th day, regardless of whether they were premature or full-term. The chief executive of the charity Bliss Caroline Lee-Davey, said "this will make a huge difference to around 60,000 parents every year, and to their babies, it will relieve the additional stress of having to juggle looking after a critically ill baby in hospital with work, ease some of the financial pressure and, by allowing parents to be more involved in their babies' care, improve the health outcomes of premature and sick babies."

In April 2023 the SNP executive appointed him as national treasurer of the SNP replacing Colin Beattie who resigned.

McDonald stood for re-election in the 2024 United Kingdom general election, but lost his seat to Katrina Murray of Scottish Labour.

Parliament of the United Kingdom
Preceded by Gregg McClymont	Member of Parliament for Cumbernauld, Kilsyth and Kirkintilloch East; 2015–2024	Succeeded by Katrina Murray
