= Katrina Murray =

British politician

Katrina Murray MP
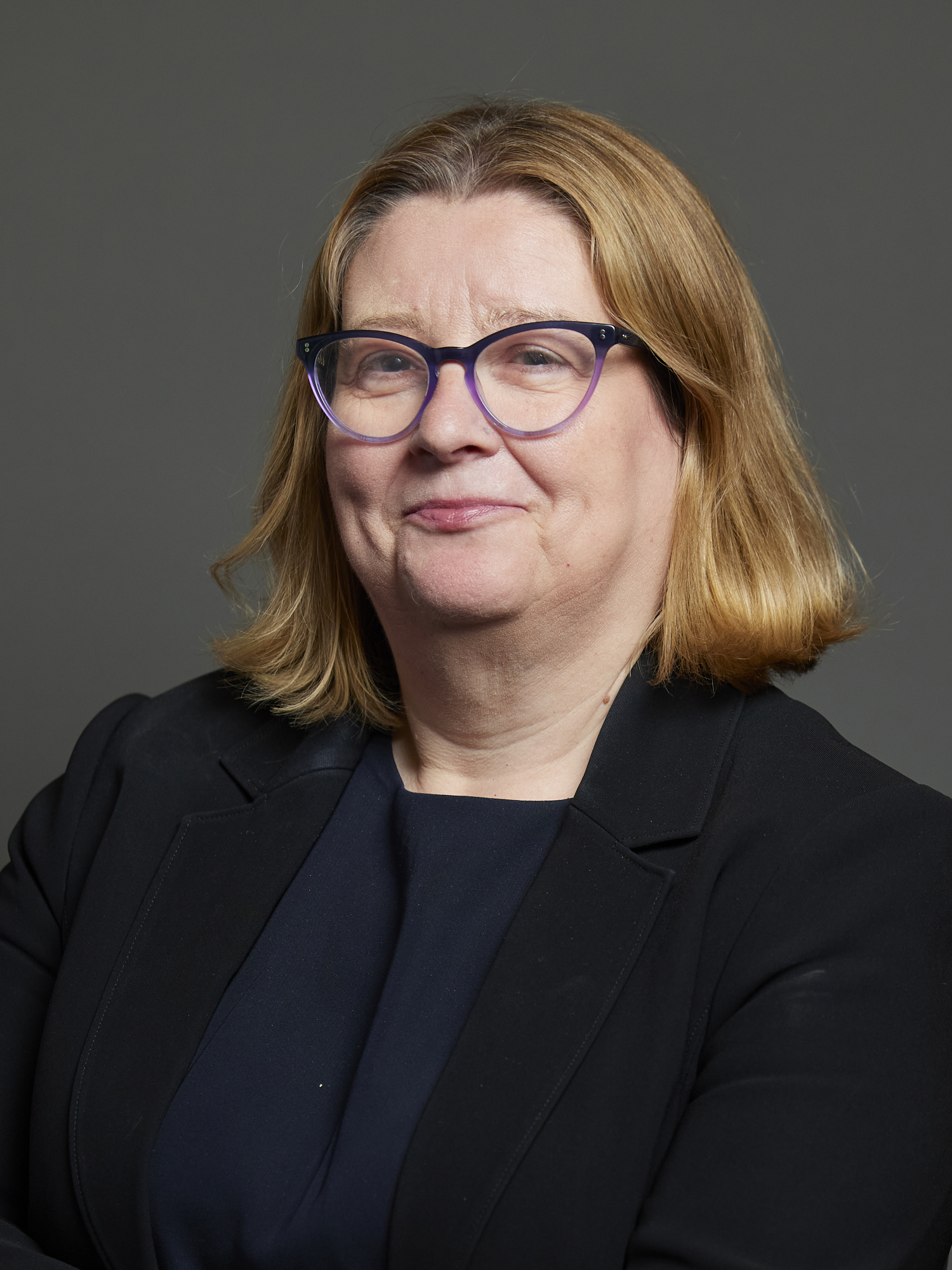
- Official portrait, 2024

Member of Parliament for Cumbernauld and Kirkintilloch
- Incumbent
- Assumed office 4 July 2024
- Preceded by: Stuart McDonald
- Majority: 4,144 (10.1%)

Personal details
- Party: Labour

Katrina Laidlan Murray is a Scottish Labour Party politician who has been the Member of Parliament (MP) for Cumbernauld and Kirkintilloch since 2024.

In the 2010 United Kingdom general election, she was the Labour candidate for Dundee East but lost to Stewart Hosie from the Scottish National Party (SNP).

In 2018, Murray was involved in an internal policy dispute within Labour's National Policy Forum after "Katrina Murray, the NPF's vice-chair, was dramatically over-ruled on the floor of the meeting by Andy Kerr, the chair of Labour's ruling National Executive Committee."
