= Susan Murray =

British politician

Susan Murray MP
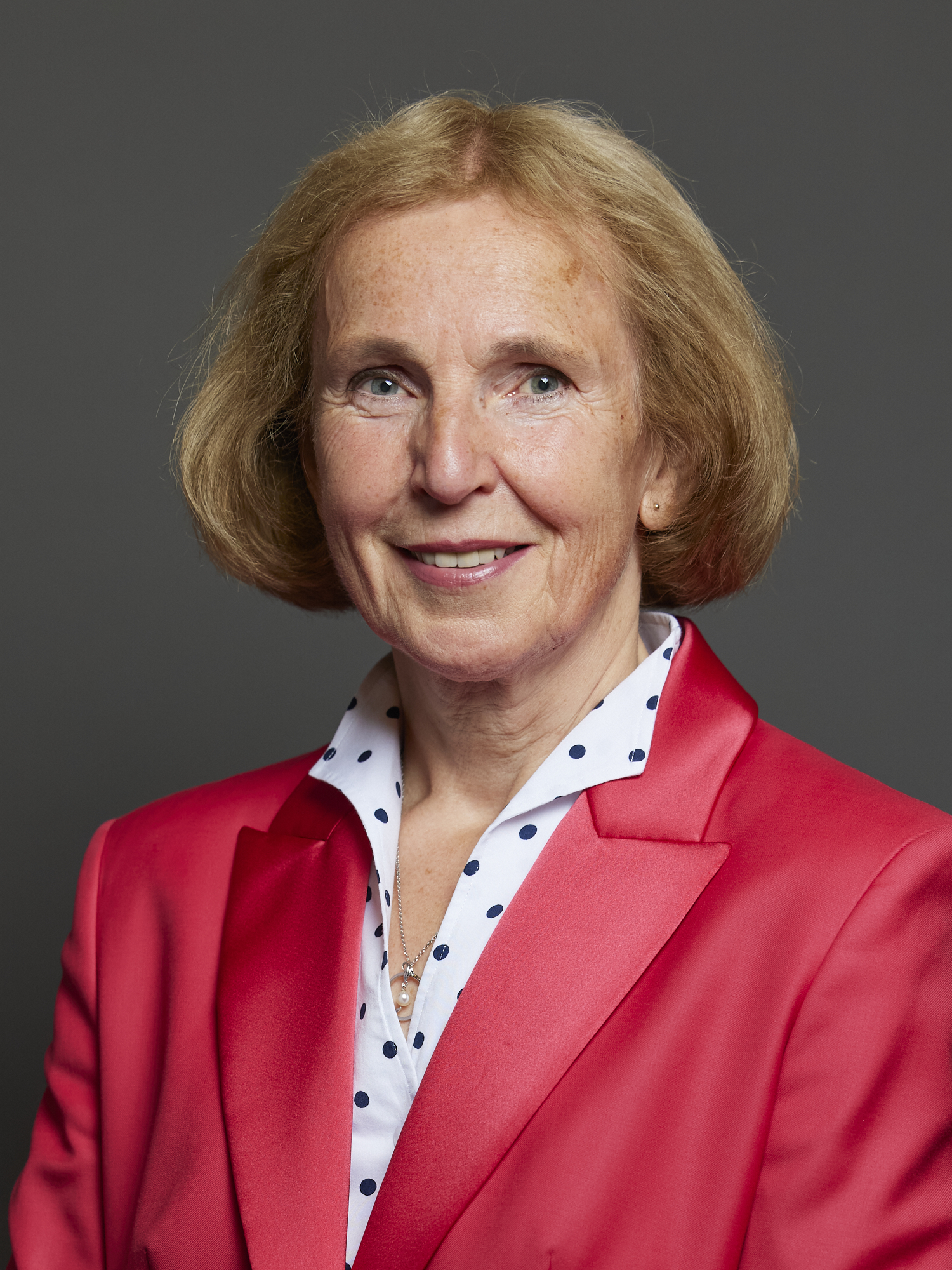
- Official portrait, 2024

Member of Parliament for Mid Dunbartonshire
- Incumbent
- Assumed office 4 July 2024
- Preceded by: Constituency established
- Majority: 9,673 (18.4%)

Liberal Democrat spokesperson for Scotland
- Incumbent
- Assumed office 1 October 2025
- Leader: Ed Davey
- Preceded by: Christine Jardine

Personal details
- Born: May 1957 (age 69) Aberdeen, Scotland
- Party: Liberal Democrats

Susan Catherine Murray (born May 1957) is a Scottish Liberal Democrat politician who has been the Member of Parliament (MP) for Mid Dunbartonshire since 2024.

== Political career ==
Murray was a councillor for Kirkintilloch East and North and Twechar ward on East Dunbartonshire Council from 2017. until her Resignation in December 2024. She is also a local businesswoman and charity founder. She stepped down from this position in December 2024, causing a by-election, to focus on her work as an MP.

At the 2019 general election, Murray contested Cumbernauld, Kilsyth and Kirkintilloch East. She increased the Liberal Democrats' previous share by 3.7%, coming last with 2,966 votes (6.5%).

At the 2021 Scottish Parliament election, Murray ran in the Strathkelvin and Bearsden constituency, where she finished fourth with 6,675 votes (14.4%). She was also the third-placed Liberal Democrat candidate on the list for the West Scotland region, though the party failed to return any list MSPs in that election.

=== Member of Parliament ===
At the 2024 general election, Murray stood in the newly-created Mid Dunbartonshire constituency, a key target seat for the party. She was successful, taking 42.4% of the vote, with a majority of 9,673. Murray's win came at the expense of the Scottish National Party's Amy Callaghan, who had represented the predecessor East Dunbartonshire seat.

Three weeks after her election, Murray declared a £2000 donation from one of Scotland's most prolific lobbyists.
