= Bearsden North (ward) =

Local government ward of East Dunbartonshire, Scotland

Location of the ward in East Dunbartonshire

Bearsden North is one of the seven wards used to elect members of the East Dunbartonshire Council. It elects three Councillors. As its name suggests, its territory (which has not altered since its creation in 2007) consists of the northern part of the burgh of Bearsden, with part of the boundary to the south following the path of the Antonine Wall; it also borders the Drumchapel housing estate in Glasgow – the marked differences in average life expectancy and other factors between residents living in close proximity in the two areas has been remarked upon in various studies. In 2020, the ward had a population of 14,943.

== Councillors ==
Election	Councillors		
2007	Ian McKay (SNP)	Amanda Stewart (Conservative)	Duncan Cumming (Liberal Democrats / Ind.)
2011	Ian McKay (SNP)	Amanda Stewart (Conservative)	Duncan Cumming (Liberal Democrats / Ind.)
2012	Ian McKay (SNP)	Ashay Ghai (Liberal Democrats)	Duncan Cumming (Liberal Democrats / Ind.)
2017	Sheila Mechan (Conservative / Ind.)	Rosie O'Neil (Liberal Democrats)	Duncan Cumming (Liberal Democrats / Ind.)
2022	Sheila Mechan (Conservative / Ind.)	Rosie O'Neil (Liberal Democrats)	Duncan Cumming (Liberal Democrats / Ind.)
2022	Calum Smith (SNP)	Alan Reid (Liberal Democrats)	Duncan Cumming (Liberal Democrats / Ind.)

== Election results ==
=== 2022 election ===
2022 East Dunbartonshire Council election

Bearsden North – 3 seats
Party	Candidate	FPv%	Count					
Party	Candidate	FPv%	1	2	3	4	5	6
Independent	Duncan Cumming (incumbent)	38.30%	2,645					
SNP	Calum Smith	19.05%	1,316	1,404.15	1,659.04	1,821.97		
Conservative	Duncan Evans	14.98%	1,035	1,263.02	1,269.45	1,370.05	1,373.07	
Liberal Democrats	Alan Reid	12.42%	858	1,119.34	1,199.81	1,569.10	1,605.73	2,378.56
Labour	Craig Muncie	9.48%	655	795.21	873.67			
Green	Neill Simpson	5.75%	397	478.56				
Electorate: 11,936 Valid: 6,909 Spoilt: 59 Quota: 1,727 Turnout: 58.4%

=== 2017 election ===
2017 East Dunbartonshire Council election

Bearsden North – 3 seats
Party	Candidate	FPv%	Count				
Party	Candidate	FPv%	1	2	3	4	5
Independent	Duncan Cumming (incumbent)	33.23%	2,338				
Conservative	Sheila Mechan	20.78%	1,462	1,635	1,650	1,693	1,780
Liberal Democrats	Rosie O'Neil	17.97%	1,264	1,449	1,538	1,716	2,415
SNP	Ian Mackay (incumbent)	18.15%	1,277	1,343	1,496	1,588	
Labour	Eunis Jassemi-Zargani	5.39%	379	411	469		
Green	Erin Crawley	4.48%	315	355			
Electorate: TBC Valid: 7,035 Spoilt: 69 Quota: 1,759 Turnout: 62.1%

=== 2012 election ===
2012 East Dunbartonshire Council election

Bearsden North – 3 seats
Party	Candidate	FPv%	Count						
Party	Candidate	FPv%	1	2	3	4	5	6	7
Independent	Duncan Cumming (incumbent)	33.2	1,837						
Liberal Democrats	Ashay Ghai *	17.1	944	1,082	1,087	1,093	1,100	1,337	1,801
SNP	Ian Mackay (incumbent)	17.4	962	1,030	1,041	1,050	1,063	1,205	1,335
Conservative	Amanda Stewart (incumbent)	16.7	921	1,017	1,019	1,039	1,066	1,141	
Labour	Stewart Moohan	12.7	700	758	770	774	785		
Scottish Christian	Bob Handyside	1.1	59	70	71	79			
UKIP	Mitch Sorbie	0.8	42	59	61				
Scottish Socialist	Neil Scott	0.6	34	40					
Electorate: 10,801 Valid: 5,499 Spoilt: 28 Quota: 1,375 Turnout: 50.91%

=== 2007 election ===
2007 East Dunbartonshire Council election

Bearsden North
Party	Candidate	FPv%	Count						
Party	Candidate	FPv%	1	2	3	4	5	6	7
Conservative	Amanda Stewart	33.3	2,383						
SNP	Ian MacKay	18.9	1,354	1,428	1,444	1,472	1,546	1,637	1,868
Labour	Ali Syed	15.1	1,082	1,138	1,147	1,163	1,221	1,340	
Liberal Democrats	Duncan Cumming†	13.7	981	1,074	1,078	1,114	1,233	1,788	2,218
Liberal Democrats	Ashay Ghai	11.4	818	875	881	894	963		
Green	Stuart Callison	4.8	344	393	411	459			
Independent	Dennis Brogan	1.8	132	199	203				
Scottish Socialist	Neil Scott	1.0	70	73					
Electorate: 10,698 Valid: 7,164 Spoilt: 56 Quota: 1,792 Turnout: 67.49%
