= Lenzie and Kirkintilloch South (ward) =

Local government ward of East Dunbartonshire

Location of the ward in East Dunbartonshire

Lenzie and Kirkintilloch South is one of the seven wards used to elect members of the East Dunbartonshire Council. It elects three Councillors. Its territory (which has not altered since its creation in 2007) consists of the village of Lenzie including the modern development at Woodilee, plus the contiguous southern parts of Kirkintilloch (neighbourhoods south of the Forth and Clyde Canal and the Luggie Water including Gallowhill, Oxgang and Townhead). In 2020, the ward had a population of 13,475.

== Councillors ==
Election	Councillors		
2007	Gillian Renwick (SNP)	Rhondda Geekie (Labour)	Anne Jarvis (Conservative)
2012	Gillian Renwick (SNP)	Rhondda Geekie (Labour)	Anne Jarvis (Conservative)
2017	Gillian Renwick (SNP)	Rod Ackland (Liberal Democrats)	Sandra Thornton (Conservative)
2022	Gillian Renwick (SNP)	Willie Paterson (Liberal Democrats)	Callum McNally (Labour Co-op)

== Election results ==
=== 2022 election ===
2022 East Dunbartonshire Council election

Lenzie & Kirkintilloch South – 3 seats
Party	Candidate	FPv%	Count					
Party	Candidate	FPv%	1	2	3	4	5	6
SNP	Gillian Renwick (incumbent)	33.23%	2,165					
Labour	Callum McNally	20.98%	1,367	1,474.19	1,484.45	1,809.77		
Conservative	Sandra Thornton (incumbent)	20.34%	1,325	1,331.44	1,344.44	1,360.89	1,377.44	
Liberal Democrats	Willie Paterson	17.36%	1,131	1,188.68	1,196.18	1,394.78	1,495.48	2,356.67
Scottish Green	Carolyn Scrimgeour	7.18%	468	744.04	752.02			
Freedom Alliance (United Kingdom)	James Watson	0.91%	59	62.71				
Electorate: 12,524 Valid: 6,515 Spoilt: 72 Quota: 1,629 Turnout: 52.6%

=== 2017 election ===
2017 East Dunbartonshire Council election

Lenzie & Kirkintilloch South – 3 seats
Party	Candidate	FPv%	Count							
Party	Candidate	FPv%	1	2	3	4	5	6	7	8
Conservative	Sandra Thornton	24.55%	1,634	1,641	1,716					
SNP	Gillian Renwick (incumbent)	22.52%	1,499	1,576	1,611	1,612	2,093			
Liberal Democrats	Rod Ackland	12.09%	805	847	896	914	928	989	1,342	1,825
Independent	Sandy Taylor	12.19%	811	841	1,037	1,049	1,070	1,180	1,298	
Labour	Rhondda Geekie (incumbent)	10.94%	728	758	777	783	797	859		
SNP	Martin Robertson	7.59%	505	543	552	552				
Independent	Alisdair Sinclair	6.23%	415	431						
Scottish Green	Carolynn Scrimgeour	3.89%	259							
Electorate: TBC Valid: 6,656 Spoilt: 103 Quota: 1,665 Turnout: 56.1%

=== 2012 election ===
2012 East Dunbartonshire Council election

Lenzie & Kirkintilloch South – 3 seats
Party	Candidate	FPv%	Count	
Party	Candidate	FPv%	1	2
Labour	Rhondda Geekie (incumbent)	36.6	1,729	
SNP	Gillian Renwick (incumbent)	32.0	1,511	
Conservative	Anne Jarvis (incumbent)	24.0	1,133	1,240
Liberal Democrats	John Duncan	7.5	353	533
Electorate: 10,412 Valid: 4,726 Spoilt: 38 Quota: 1182 Turnout: 45.39%

=== 2007 election ===
2007 East Dunbartonshire Council election

Lenzie and Kirkintilloch South
Party	Candidate	FPv%	Count								
Party	Candidate	FPv%	1	2	3	4	5	6	7	8	9
Labour	Rhondda Geekie	28.8	1,937								
Conservative	Anne Jarvis	26.3	1,772								
SNP	Gillian Renwick	16.8	1,128	1,163	1,174	1,201	1,233	1,282	1,325	1,477	1,838
Liberal Democrats	Gordon MacDonald	10.1	681	717	731	741	764	800	1,032	1,139	
EDIA	Ken Selbie	6.5	435	454	464	473	538	575	592		
Liberal Democrats	Margaret Morris	4.1	277	290	299	305	318	359			
Independent	James Barker	3.0	201	221	229	239					
Scottish Green	Isabel Park	2.8	191	210	216	241	261				
Scottish Socialist	Moira Brown	1.5	103	118	120						
Electorate: Valid: 6,725 Spoilt: 87 Quota: 1,682 Turnout: 64.08%
