= Bishopbriggs South =

Local government ward of East Dunbartonshire

Location of the ward in East Dunbartonshire

Bishopbriggs South is one of the seven wards used to elect members of the East Dunbartonshire Council. Created in 2007, it elects three Councillors. As its name suggests, its territory consists of the southern part of the burgh of Bishopbriggs (including Auchinairn), bordering the city of Glasgow further south; following a 2017 boundary review, some streets in the west of the town (between the Croy Line railway tracks and the Bishopbriggs Burn) were added from the Bishopbriggs North and Torrance ward, but the number of representatives did not change. In 2020, the ward had a population of 15,868.

== Councillors ==
Election	Councillors		
2007	Gordon Low (SNP)	Michael O'Donnell (Labour)	Alex Hannah (Labour)
2009	Gordon Low (SNP)	Michael O'Donnell (Labour)	Alan Moir (Labour)
2012	Gordon Low (SNP)	Michael O'Donnell (Labour)	Alan Moir (Labour)
2017	Gordon Low (SNP)	Alan Brown (Conservative)	Alan Moir (Labour)
2022	Gordon Low (SNP)	Ben Rose (Liberal Democrats)	Alan Moir (Labour)

== Election results ==
=== 2022 election ===
2022 East Dunbartonshire Council election

Bishopbriggs South – 3 seats
Party	Candidate	FPv%	Count					
Party	Candidate	FPv%	1	2	3	4	5	6
SNP	Gordan Low (incumbent)	36.92%	2,241					
Labour	Alan Moir (incumbent)	27.25%	1,654					
Conservative	Catherine Brown	17.27%	1,048	1,061.87	1,076.92	1,091.22	1,119.07	
Liberal Democrats	Ben Rose	12.45%	756	865.69	918.89	938.25	1,235.73	1,962.71
Green	Jesper Bach	4.68%	284	662.76	682.89	751.42		
Alba	Eamonn Gallagher	1.08%	87	150.56	154.59			
Electorate: 12,340 Valid: 6,070 Spoilt: 70 Quota: 1,518 Turnout: 49.8%

=== 2017 election ===
2017 East Dunbartonshire Council election

Bishopbriggs South – 3 seats
Party	Candidate	FPv%	Count					
Party	Candidate	FPv%	1	2	3	4	5	6
Conservative	Alan Brown	26.74%	1,631					
SNP	Gordan Low (incumbent)	24.05%	1,467	1,470	1,536			
Labour	Alan Moir (incumbent)	16.27%	992	1,011	1,062	1,062	1,303	2,280
Labour	Ian Elrick	14.72%	898	926	996	996	1,194	
SNP	Irene Mackay	13.76	839	840	883	892		
Green	Connor Boyd	4.46%	272	281				
Electorate: TBS Valid: 6,099 Spoilt: 166 Quota: 1,525 Turnout: 50.3%

=== 2012 election ===
2012 East Dunbartonshire Council election

Bishopbriggs South – 3 seats
Party	Candidate	FPv%	Count	
Party	Candidate	FPv%	1	2
Labour	Alan Moir (incumbent)	32.8	1,267	
SNP	Gordan Low (incumbent)	29.9	1,158	
Labour	Michael O'Donnell (incumbent)	18.7	724	985
Conservative	Alisdair Sinclair	9.4	362	373
Liberal Democrats	Gary Pews	7.7	297	307
Scottish Socialist	Mark Callaghan	1.5	59	62
Electorate: 9,406 Valid: 3,930 Spoilt: 63 Quota: 967 Turnout: 41.78%

=== 2009 by-election ===
Bishopbriggs South By-election (4 June 2009)- 1 Seat
Party	Candidate	FPv%	Count			
Party	Candidate	FPv%	1	2	3	4
Labour	Alan Moir	39.2	1,401	1,479	1,784	1,787
SNP	Denis Johnston	23.4	837	949	1,223	
Liberal Democrats	Alastair McPhee	20.6	736	928		
Conservative	Matt Ford	14.0	500			
Scottish Socialist	Mark Callaghan	2.7	96			
Labour hold		Swing				
Electorate: 23,202 Valid: 5,196 Spoilt: 65 Quota: 2,599 Turnout: 5,261 (22.7%)

=== 2007 election ===
2007 East Dunbartonshire Council election

Bishopbriggs South
Party	Candidate	FPv%	Count						
Party	Candidate	FPv%	1	2	3	4	5	6	7
Labour	Alex Hannah	27.7	1,505						
SNP	Gordon Low	20.1	1,095	1,105	1,114	1,264	1,430		
Conservative	Alan Brown	14.1	767	774	805	897	1,060	1,073	
Labour	Michael O'Donnell	14.0	761	845	848	942	1,117	1,135	1,399
EDIA	Donald MacDonald	12.1	656	666	673	771			
Liberal Democrats	Tom Dibble	10.8	586	595	600				
Scottish Unionist	Derek Doughty	1.3	70	71					
Electorate: Valid: 5,440 Spoilt: 99 Quota: 1,361 Turnout: 58.50%
