= Bearsden South (ward) =

Local government ward of East Dunbartonshire, Scotland

Location of the ward in East Dunbartonshire

Bearsden South is one of the seven wards used to elect members of the East Dunbartonshire Council. It elects three Councillors. As its name suggests, its territory (which has not altered since its creation in 2007) consists of the southern part of the burgh of Bearsden, with part of the boundary to the north following the path of the Antonine Wall; it also borders the Drumchapel housing estate in Glasgow – the marked differences in average life expectancy and other factors between residents living in close proximity in the two areas has been remarked upon in various studies.

The southern boundary is formed largely from the Forth and Clyde Canal and the River Kelvin, with other parts of northern Glasgow on the opposite banks. In 2020, the ward had a population of 13,318.

== Councillors ==
Election	Councillors		
2007	Graeme Douglas (SNP)	Simon Huchison (Conservative)	Vaughan Moody (Liberal Democrats)
2009	Graeme Douglas (SNP)	Ashay Ghai (Liberal Democrats)	Vaughan Moody (Liberal Democrats)
2012	Keith Small (SNP)	Manjinder Shergill (Labour)	Vaughan Moody (Liberal Democrats)
2017	Denis Johnston (SNP)	Andrew Polson (Conservative) / Independent	Vaughan Moody (Liberal Democrats)
2022	Ian Gallagher (SNP)	Andrew Polson (Conservative) / Independent	Vaughan Moody (Liberal Democrats)
2026 by-	Ian Gallagher (SNP)	Ben Langmead (Liberal Democrats)	Vaughan Moody (Liberal Democrats)

== Election results ==
=== 2026 by-election ===
29 January 2026: Due to the resignation of Andrew Polson.

- Duncan Evans (Scottish Conservative and Unionist Party)
- Lynne Gibbons (Scottish National Party)
- Ben Langmead (Scottish Liberal Democrats)
- Liam McKechnie (Scottish Family Party)
- John Fairlie (Reform UK)
- Lorna Dougall (Scottish Labour)
- Emma Sheppard (Scottish Greens)

=== 2022 election ===
2022 East Dunbartonshire Council election

Bearsden South – 3 seats
Party	Candidate	FPv%	Count					
Party	Candidate	FPv%	1	2	3	4	5	6
SNP	Ian Gallagher	23.39%	1,490	1,497	1,521	1,783		
Conservative	Andrew Polson (incumbent)	23.20%	1,478	1,488	1,567	1,571	1,574.94	1,604.40
Liberal Democrats	Vaughan Moody (incumbent)	23.12%	1,473	1,487	1,590	1,669		
Labour	Lorna Dougall	16.06%	1,023	1,035	1,103	1,197	1,286.40	1,312.08
Green	Scott Ferguson	7.17%	457	469	491			
Independent	Sheila Mechan	4.74%	302	383				
Independent	Duncan Malcolm	2.31%	147					
Electorate: 11,099 Valid: 6,370 Spoilt: 50 Quota: 1,593 Turnout: 57.8%

=== 2017 election ===
2017 East Dunbartonshire Council election

Bearsden South – 3 seats
Party	Candidate	FPv%	Count					
Party	Candidate	FPv%	1	2	3	4	5	6
Conservative	Andrew Polson	27.96%	1,859					
Liberal Democrats	Vaughan Moody (incumbent)	21.62%	1,437	1,519	1,660	2,019		
SNP	Denis Johnston	18.13%	1,205	1,207	1,420	1,547	1,597	1,973
Independent	Alan Oliver	13.19%	877	919	995	1,123	1,250	
Labour	Manjinder Shergill (incumbent)	10.38%	690	711	815			
Green	Scott Ferguson	8.72%	580	585				
Electorate: TBC Valid: 6,648 Spoilt: 50 Quota: 1,663 Turnout: 61.7%

=== 2012 election ===
2012 East Dunbartonshire Council election

Bearsden South – 3 seats
Party	Candidate	FPv%	Count					
Party	Candidate	FPv%	1	2	3	4	5	6
Liberal Democrats	Vaughan Moody (incumbent)	26.8	1,309					
SNP	Keith Small	25.4	1,243					
Labour	Manjinder Shergill	20.4	996	1,022	1,028	1,046	1,178	1,408
Conservative	David Mason	19.2	937	963	966	1,018	1,049	
Green	Scott Ferguson	5.0	247	263	272	292		
Scottish Christian	Christine Cormack	2.5	124	127	129			
Electorate: 10,452 Valid: 4,856 Spoilt: 28 Quota: 1,215 Turnout: 46.46%

=== 2009 by-election ===
Bearsden South By-election (10 December 2009)- 1 Seat
Party	Candidate	FPv%	Count		
Party	Candidate	FPv%	1	2	3
Conservative	Rachel Higgins	33.4	1,261	1,306	1,499
Liberal Democrats	Ashay Ghai	29.4	1,110	1,381	1,770
SNP	Fiona McLeod	20.7	783	972	
Labour	Manjinder Shergill	16.6	626		
Liberal Democrats gain from Conservative		Swing			
Electorate: 10,850 Valid: 3,780 Spoilt: 150 Quota: 1,891 Turnout: 3,930 (36.22%)

=== 2007 election ===
2007 East Dunbartonshire Council election

Bearsden South
Party	Candidate	FPv%	Count						
Party	Candidate	FPv%	1	2	3	4	5	6	7
Conservative	Simon Hutchison	24.4	1,654	1,677	1,794				
Labour	Manjinder Shergill	19.3	1,305	1,357	1,386	1,394	1,473	1,486	
SNP	Graeme Douglas	19.1	1,294	1,352	1,432	1,446	1,521	1,531	1,938
Liberal Democrats	Vaughan Moody	16.1	1,094	1,172	1,218	1,239	1,741		
Liberal Democrats	John Morrison	10.3	695	733	786	795			
Independent	Garry McKendrick	5.7	387	421					
Green	Scott Ferguson	5.1	349						
Electorate: Valid: 6,778 Spoilt: 59 Quota: 1,695 Turnout: 66.15%
