= 2007 East Dunbartonshire Council election =

2007 Scottish local government election

- 3 May 2007

All 24 seats to East Dunbartonshire Council 13 seats needed for a majority

Elections to East Dunbartonshire Council were held on 3 May 2007, the same day as the other Scottish local government elections and the Scottish Parliament general election. This election was the first to use eight new multi-member wards created as a result of the Local Governance (Scotland) Act 2004. Each ward returned three councillors elected under the single transferable vote form of proportional representation, replacing the previous 24 single-member wards, which had used the plurality (first past the post) system of election.

== Election results ==
East Dunbartonshire local election result 2007
Party	Seats	Gains	Losses	Net gain/loss	Seats %	Votes %	Votes	+/−
SNP	8	N/A	N/A	+8	33.3	18.2	9,146	
Labour	6	N/A	N/A	-1	25.0	25.9	13,025	
Conservative	5	N/A	N/A	+2	20.8	21.5	10,788	
Liberal Democrats	3	N/A	N/A	-9	12.5	17.9	9,001	
East Dunbartonshire Independent Alliance	2	N/A	N/A	+2	8.3	11.4	5,703	
Green	0	N/A	N/A	0	0.0	2.4	1,191	
Scottish Socialist	0	N/A	N/A	0	0.0	0.7	344	
Scottish Unionist	0	N/A	N/A	0	0.0	0.2	114	
Independent	0	N/A	N/A	-2	0.0	1.8	896	

== Ward results ==
=== Milngavie ===
Milngavie
Party	Candidate	FPv%	Count							
Party	Candidate	FPv%	1	2	3	4	5	6	7	8
SNP	Jim Gibbons	20.1	1,310	1,327	1,388	1,475	1,581	1,637		
Conservative	Bill Binks	18.8	1,230	1,234	1,277	1,305	1,372	1,436	1,436	1,742
Liberal Democrats	Eric Gotts	18.8	1,226	1,229	1,257	1,304	1,951			
Labour	Peter Ritchie	17.8	1,161	1,175	1,217	1,263	1,336	1,400	1,400	
Liberal Democrats	Fiona Risk	14.1	919	924	962	1,051				
EDIA	Pat Ryan	4.7	308	314						
Green	Emma Sheppard	4.7	307	319	364					
Scottish Socialist	Bill Newman	1.1	71							
Electorate: 10,124 Valid: 6,532 Spoilt: 61 Quota: 1,634 Turnout: 65.12%

=== Bearsden North ===
Bearsden North
Party	Candidate	FPv%	Count						
Party	Candidate	FPv%	1	2	3	4	5	6	7
Conservative	Amanda Stewart	33.3	2,383						
SNP	Ian MacKay	18.9	1,354	1,428	1,444	1,472	1,546	1,637	1,868
Labour	Ali Syed	15.1	1,082	1,138	1,147	1,163	1,221	1,340	
Liberal Democrats	Duncan Cumming†	13.7	981	1,074	1,078	1,114	1,233	1,788	2,218
Liberal Democrats	Ashay Ghai	11.4	818	875	881	894	963		
Green	Stuart Callison	4.8	344	393	411	459			
Independent	Dennis Brogan	1.8	132	199	203				
Scottish Socialist	Neil Scott	1.0	70	73					
Electorate: 10,698 Valid: 7,164 Spoilt: 56 Quota: 1,792 Turnout: 67.49%

=== Bearsden South ===
Bearsden South
Party	Candidate	FPv%	Count						
Party	Candidate	FPv%	1	2	3	4	5	6	7
Conservative	Simon Hutchison	24.4	1,654	1,677	1,794				
Labour	Manjinder Shergill	19.3	1,305	1,357	1,386	1,394	1,473	1,486	
SNP	Graeme Douglas	19.1	1,294	1,352	1,432	1,446	1,521	1,531	1,938
Liberal Democrats	Vaughan Moody	16.1	1,094	1,172	1,218	1,239	1,741		
Liberal Democrats	John Morrison	10.3	695	733	786	795			
Independent	Garry McKendrick	5.7	387	421					
Green	Scott Ferguson	5.1	349						
Electorate: Valid: 6,778 Spoilt: 59 Quota: 1,695 Turnout: 66.15%

=== Campsie and Kirkintilloch North ===
Campsie and Kirkintilloch North
Party	Candidate	FPv%	Count					
Party	Candidate	FPv%	1	2	3	4	5	6
EDIA	Charles Kennedy	48.6	2,609					
Labour	John Dempsey	17.7	950	1,179	1,383			
SNP	David Ritchie	13.1	704	890	911	917	990	1,337
Liberal Democrats	Cathy McInnes	9.6	515	639	667	675	826	
Conservative	Catherine Brown	6.2	333	436	447	450		
Labour	Alex Wingate	4.8	255	350				
Electorate: Valid: 5,366 Spoilt: 68 Quota: 1,342 Turnout: 62.68%

=== Bishopbriggs North and Torrance ===
Bishopbriggs North and Torrance
Party	Candidate	FPv%	Count						
Party	Candidate	FPv%	1	2	3	4	5	6	7
Conservative	Billy Hendry	33.7	2,370						
Labour	Una Walker	27.0	1,899						
SNP	Anne McNair	17.6	1,242	1,333	1,352	1,364	1,400	1,551	2,003
Liberal Democrats	Margaret McNaughton	13.2	927	1,017	1,047	1,059	1,095	1,231	
EDIA	Jim Gilmour	5.4	379	463	477	499	593		
Independent	Bernard Mills	2.5	176	218	228	245			
Scottish Unionist	Diane McDougall	0.6	44	100	103				
Electorate: Valid: 7,037 Spoilt: 51 Quota: 1,760 Turnout: 65.79%

=== Bishopbriggs South ===
Bishopbriggs South
Party	Candidate	FPv%	Count						
Party	Candidate	FPv%	1	2	3	4	5	6	7
Labour	Alex Hannah	27.7	1,505						
SNP	Gordon Low	20.1	1,095	1,105	1,114	1,264	1,430		
Conservative	Alan Brown	14.1	767	774	805	897	1,060	1,073	
Labour	Michael O'Donnell	14.0	761	845	848	942	1,117	1,135	1,399
EDIA	Donald MacDonald	12.1	656	666	673	771			
Liberal Democrats	Tom Dibble	10.8	586	595	600				
Scottish Unionist	Derek Doughty	1.3	70	71					
Electorate: Valid: 5,440 Spoilt: 99 Quota: 1,361 Turnout: 58.50%

=== Lenzie and Kirkintilloch South ===
Lenzie and Kirkintilloch South
Party	Candidate	FPv%	Count								
Party	Candidate	FPv%	1	2	3	4	5	6	7	8	9
Labour	Rhondda Geekie	28.8	1,937								
Conservative	Anne Jarvis	26.3	1,772								
SNP	Gillian Renwick	16.8	1,128	1,163	1,174	1,201	1,233	1,282	1,325	1,477	1,838
Liberal Democrats	Gordon MacDonald	10.1	681	717	731	741	764	800	1,032	1,139	
EDIA	Ken Selbie	6.5	435	454	464	473	538	575	592		
Liberal Democrats	Margaret Morris	4.1	277	290	299	305	318	359			
Independent	James Barker	3.0	201	221	229	239					
Green	Isabel Park	2.8	191	210	216	241	261				
Scottish Socialist	Moira Brown	1.5	103	118	120						
Electorate: Valid: 6,725 Spoilt: 87 Quota: 1,682 Turnout: 64.08%

=== Kirkintilloch East and Twechar ===
Kirkintilloch East and Twechar
Party	Candidate	FPv%	Count						
Party	Candidate	FPv%	1	2	3	4	5	6	7
Labour	Stewart MacDonald	28.7	1,487						
EDIA	Jack Young	25.4	1,316						
SNP	John Jamieson	19.7	1,019	1,029	1,033	1,064	1,114	1,241	1,464
Labour	Alan Moir	13.4	693	828	832	859	886	953	
Liberal Democrats	Rod Ackland	5.4	282	288	289	298	373		
Conservative	Alison Lothian	5.4	279	281	283	285			
Scottish Socialist	Willie Telfer	1.9	100	103	104				
Electorate: Valid: 5,176 Spoilt: 85 Quota: 1,295 Turnout: 55.18%

== Aftermath ==
Although the SNP were elected as the largest group (winning their first ever councillors on East Dunbartonshire Council), the administration was formed by a Labour/Conservative coalition. Labour councillors Rhondda Geekie and Alex Hannah became Leader and Provost respectively, with the positions of Depute Leader and Depute Provost being filled by Conservative councillors Billy Hendry and Anne Jarvis. However, following the death of Alex Hannah in April 2009, LibDem councillor Eric Gotts was appointed as Provost.

In December 2009, Lib Dem representation increased briefly to 4, following Ashay Ghai's win in the Bearsden South by-election caused by the resignation of the Conservatives' Simon Hutchison. However, their numbers reverted to 3 in June 2011, when Lib Dem councillor Duncan Cumming resigned from the party citing issues relating to the Liberal Democrats' role in the UK coalition government, sitting thereafter as an Independent.

== Changes since 2007 Election ==
- A by-election was held to fill the vacancy which arose with the death of Labour Cllr Alex Hannah on 12 April 2009. The seat was held by Labour's Alan Moir on 4 June 2009
- A by-election was held to fill the vacancy which arose following the resignation of Conservative Cllr Simon Hutchison on 29 October 2009. The seat was won by the Liberal Democrats Ashay Ghai on 10 December 2009.
- †On 10 July 2011, Bearsden North Cllr Duncan Cumming resigned from the Liberal Democrats and thereafter sat as an Independent.

== By-elections since 2007 Election ==
=== Bishopbriggs South ===
Bishopbriggs South By-election (4 June 2009) - 1 Seat
Party	Candidate	FPv%	Count			
Party	Candidate	FPv%	1	2	3	4
Labour	Alan Moir	39.2	1,401	1,479	1,784	1,787
SNP	Denis Johnston	23.4	837	949	1,223	
Liberal Democrats	Alastair McPhee	20.6	736	928		
Conservative	Matt Ford	14.0	500			
Scottish Socialist	Mark Callaghan	2.7	96			
Labour hold		Swing				
Electorate: 23,202 Valid: 5,196 Spoilt: 65 Quota: 2,599 Turnout: 5,261 (22.7%)

=== Bearsden South ===
Bearsden South By-election (10 December 2009) - 1 Seat
Party	Candidate	FPv%	Count		
Party	Candidate	FPv%	1	2	3
Conservative	Rachel Higgins	33.4	1,261	1,306	1,499
Liberal Democrats	Ashay Ghai	29.4	1,110	1,381	1,770
SNP	Fiona McLeod	20.7	783	972	
Labour	Manjinder Shergill	16.6	626		
Liberal Democrats gain from Conservative		Swing			
Electorate: 10,850 Valid: 3,780 Spoilt: 150 Quota: 1,891 Turnout: 3,930 (36.22%)
