= Kirkintilloch East and North and Twechar (ward) =

Local government ward of East Dunbartonshire

Location of the ward in East Dunbartonshire

Kirkintilloch East and North and Twechar is one of the seven wards used to elect members of the East Dunbartonshire Council. It elects three Councillors. The current entity was technically created in 2017 following a boundary review, but has largely the same boundaries as the 2007 Kirkintilloch East and Twechar ward, which as its name suggests encompassed the eastern parts of Kirkintilloch (neighbourhoods between the Forth and Clyde Canal and the Luggie Water, including Harestanes, Hillhead, Merkland and Waterside) and the separate village of Twechar further east, up to the boundary with Kilsyth and Cumbernauld in North Lanarkshire.

The 2017 amendments involved the addition of the Kirkintilloch neighbourhoods north of the canal / along the A803 road from the defunct Campsie & Kirkintilloch North ward with the name also altered to reflect this, although the number of representatives did not change. In 2020, the ward population was 18,251.

== Councillors ==
Election	Councillors		
2007	John Jamieson (SNP)	Stewart MacDonald (Labour)	Jack Young (EDIA / Ind.)
2012	John Jamieson (SNP)	Stewart MacDonald (Labour)	Jack Young (EDIA / Ind.)
2012	John Jamieson (SNP)	Stewart MacDonald (Labour)	Jack Young (EDIA / Ind.)
2017	John Jamieson (SNP)	Stewart MacDonald (Labour)	Susan Murray (Liberal Democrats)
2022	Pamela Marshall (SNP)	Stewart MacDonald (Labour)	Susan Murray (Liberal Democrats)
2025	Pamela Marshall (SNP)	Stewart MacDonald (Labour)	Aidan Marshall (Labour)

== Election results ==
=== 2025 by-election ===
A by-election was held on 13 February 2025.

=== 2022 election ===
2022 East Dunbartonshire Council election

Kirkintilloch East & North & Twechar – 3 seats
Party	Candidate	FPv%	Count		
Party	Candidate	FPv%	1	2	3
SNP	Pamela Marshall	38.88	2,095		
Labour	Stewart MacDonald (incumbent)	29.17	1,572		
Liberal Democrats	Susan Murray (incumbent)	18.67	1,006	1,307.65	1,404.40
Conservative	Josephine MacLeod	11.95	644	663.61	692.82
Freedom Alliance (United Kingdom)	Alan McManus	1.34	72	180.75	199.13
Electorate: 12,318 Valid: 5,389 Spoilt: 87 Quota: 1,348 Turnout: 44.5%

=== 2017 election ===
2017 East Dunbartonshire Council election

Kirkintilloch East & North & Twechar – 3 seats
Party	Candidate	FPv%	Count					
Party	Candidate	FPv%	1	2	3	4	5	6
SNP	John Jamieson (incumbent)	19.80%	1,115	1,132	1,144	1,872		
Labour	Stewart MacDonald (incumbent)	19.33%	1,089	1,101	1,241	1,269	1,366	1,645
Liberal Democrats	Susan Murray	16.25%	915	931	1,183	1,215	1,281	1,678
Independent	Willie Paterson	15.11%	851	871	1,028	1,053	1,185	
SNP	Pamela Marshall	14.29%	805	849	858			
Conservative	Alison Lothian	13.16%	741	741				
Green	Emma Sheppard	2.06%	116					
Electorate: TBC Valid: 5,632 Spoilt: 119 Quota: 1,409 Turnout: 47.9%

=== 2012 election ===
2012 East Dunbartonshire Council election

Kirkintilloch East & Twechar – 3 seats
Party	Candidate	FPv%	Count		
Party	Candidate	FPv%	1	2	3
Labour	Stewart MacDonald (incumbent)	36.2	1,293		
EDIA	Jack Young (incumbent)	26.4	941		
SNP	John Jamieson (incumbent)	24.3	868	892	904
Labour	Jim Neill	6.8	241	571	583
Conservative	Alison Lothian	3.3	118	121	124
Liberal Democrats	Samantha Johnstone	1.8	66	70	72
Scottish Socialist	Willie Telfer	1.1	41	47	51
Electorate: 8,918 Valid: 3,568 Spoilt: 72 Quota: 893 Turnout: 40.01%

=== 2007 election ===
2007 East Dunbartonshire Council election

Kirkintilloch East and Twechar
Party	Candidate	FPv%	Count						
Party	Candidate	FPv%	1	2	3	4	5	6	7
Labour	Stewart MacDonald	28.7	1,487						
EDIA	Jack Young	25.4	1,316						
SNP	John Jamieson	19.7	1,019	1,029	1,033	1,064	1,114	1,241	1,464
Labour	Alan Moir	13.4	693	828	832	859	886	953	
Liberal Democrats	Rod Ackland	5.4	282	288	289	298	373		
Conservative	Alison Lothian	5.4	279	281	283	285			
Scottish Socialist	Willie Telfer	1.9	100	103	104				
Electorate: Valid: 5,176 Spoilt: 85 Quota: 1,295 Turnout: 55.18%
