= East Dunbartonshire Independent Alliance =

Political party in Scotland

The East Dunbartonshire Independent Alliance was a minor political party operating in East Dunbartonshire, Scotland, represented on East Dunbartonshire Council until October 2012 by Jack Young, one of the three councillors for Kirkintilloch East & Twechar, and until July 2012 by Charles Kennedy, one of the three councillors for Campsie & Kirkintilloch North.

Kennedy and Young had originally been Labour representatives: Charles Kennedy was first elected to represent the Milton & Gartshore ward of Strathkelvin District Council in 1984, and subsequently the Milton ward of its successor, East Dunbartonshire Council, in 1995, serving terms as Labour Group Leader and Leader of the Council in both authorities. Re-elected in May 2003, he was joined that year as a Labour councillor by Jack Young, newly elected to represent the Rosebank/Waterside ward.

May 2003 also saw the election of Jean Turner, as independent MSP for Strathkelvin & Bearsden in the Scottish Parliamentary elections, and in June 2004 Kennedy was expelled from the Labour Party accused of actively supporting her campaign. Jack Young then resigned from the party in support of Kennedy, and both chose to sit on as independent councillors without contesting by-elections.

In November 2004, Kennedy and Young announced the formation of the Strathkelvin People's Independent Labour Party with the intention of campaigning on issues such as the reduction in services at the local Stobhill General Hospital, and of seeking support from people disillusioned with the way in which East Dunbartonshire Council was being run.

An inaugural meeting was held on 6 December 2004, it being announced beforehand that the party's name might be changed from the "Strathkelvin People's Independent Labour Party". However, the name East Dunbartonshire Independent Alliance had already been registered with the Electoral Commission, and it is this name that the grouping (which was largely confined to Kennedy and Young themselves) continued to use, with the more unwieldy "Strathkelvin People's Independent Labour Party" not seemingly having been used at all beyond the outset of the party's formation and early days.

At the local elections on 3 May 2007, the East Dunbartonshire Independent Alliance fielded six candidates across East Dunbartonshire, ranging from Donald Macdonald, a community activist, to Jim Gilmour, a successful businessman who had been an unsuccessful Labour local government candidate in 2003. However, only the party's two sitting councillors, Charles Kennedy and Jack Young, were returned for the new three-member wards of Campsie & Kirkintilloch North and Kirkintilloch East & Twechar respectively. Both were again re-elected on 3 May 2012, when just the two candidates were fielded.

Charles Kennedy died on Friday 13 July 2012, and no Independent Alliance candidate stood at the ensuing by-election on 13 September. The party was voluntarily deregistered with the Electoral Commission on 11 October, Jack Young reverting to his previous status as an independent councillor. Young retired from the council at the following election in May 2017.
