= 2012 East Dunbartonshire Council election =

2012 Scottish local government election

- 3 May 2012

All 24 seats to East Dunbartonshire Council 13 seats needed for a majority
	First party	Second party	Third party
Leader	Rhondda Geekie	Ian Mackay	Ashay Ghai
Party	Labour	SNP	Liberal Democrats
Leader's seat	Lenzie & Kirkintilloch South	Bearsden North	Bearsden North
Last election	6 seats, 25.0%	8 seats, 33.3%	3 seats, 12.5%
Seats before	6	8	2
Seats won	8	8	3
Seat change	▲2	0	0
	Fourth party	Fifth party	Sixth party
Leader	Billy Hendry	Charles Kennedy	Duncan Cumming
Party	Conservative	EDIA	Independent
Leader's seat	Bishopbriggs North and Torrance	Campsie & Kirkintilloch North	Bearsden North
Last election	5 seats, 20.8%	2 seats, 8.3%	0 seats, 0%
Seats before	5	2	0
Seats won	2	2	1
Seat change	▼3	0	▲1
Council Leader before election
Rhondda Geekie
Labour
Council Leader after election
Rhondda Geekie
Labour

Elections to East Dunbartonshire Council were held on 3 May 2012, the same day as the 31 other local authorities in Scotland. The election used the eight wards created under the Local Governance (Scotland) Act 2004, with 24 Councillors being elected. Each ward elected 3 members, using the STV electoral system.

The election saw Labour gain 2 seats to draw level with the Scottish National Party. However, Labour remained the largest party in terms of vote share. The Scottish National Party retained all their existing 8 seats and did not run any additional candidates though did significantly raised their vote share. The Scottish Liberal Democrats retained their 3 seats on the council. The Scottish Conservative and Unionist Party lost 3 seats, just 2 in number, the equivalent numbers of the East Dunbartonshire Independent Alliance. Former Lib Dem Cllr Duncan Cumming was elected as an Independent.

== Election result ==
East Dunbartonshire local election result 2012
Party	Seats	Gains	Losses	Net gain/loss	Seats %	Votes %	Votes	+/−
Labour	8	2	0	+2	33.3	28.3	10,334	+2.4
SNP	8	-	-	-	33.3	25.4	9,277	+7.2
Liberal Democrats	3	-	-	-	12.5	14.9	5,450	-3.0
Conservative	2	0	3	-3	8.3	15.4	5,629	-6.1
EDIA	2	-	-	-	8.3	8.1	2,973	-3.3
Independent	1	1	0	+1	4.2	6.1	2,224	+3.7
Green	0	-	-	-	-	0.7	247	-1.1
Scottish Christian	0	-	-	-	-	0.5	183	+0.3
Scottish Socialist	0	-	-	-	-	0.4	134	-0.3
UKIP	0	-	-	-	-	0.1	42	New

Note: "Votes" are the first preference votes. The net gain/loss and percentage changes relate to the result of the previous Scottish local elections on 3 May 2007. This may differ from other published sources showing gain/loss relative to seats held at dissolution of Scotland's councils.

== Ward results ==
=== Milngavie ===
- 2007: 1xSNP; 1xCon; 1xLib Dem
- 2012: 1xLib Dem; 1xSNP; 1xLab
- 2007-2012 Change: Lab gain one seat from Con

Milngavie – 3 seats
Party	Candidate	FPv%	Count		
Party	Candidate	FPv%	1	2	3
Liberal Democrats	Eric Gotts (incumbent)	36.6	1,751		
SNP	Jim Gibbons (incumbent)	28.0	1,338		
Labour	Maureen Henry	20.0	955	1,177	1,283
Conservative	Bill Binks (incumbent)	14.6	696	866	889
Electorate: 10,289 Valid: 4,740 Spoilt: 42 Quota: 1,186 Turnout: 46.07%

=== Bearsden North ===
- 2007: 1xCon; 1xSNP; 1xLib Dem
- 2012: 1xIndependent; 1xLib Dem; 1xSNP
- 2007-2012 Change: Independent gain one seat from Con

Bearsden North – 3 seats
Party	Candidate	FPv%	Count						
Party	Candidate	FPv%	1	2	3	4	5	6	7
Independent	Duncan Cumming (incumbent)	33.2	1,837						
Liberal Democrats	Ashay Ghai *	17.1	944	1,082	1,087	1,093	1,100	1,337	1,801
SNP	Ian Mackay (incumbent)	17.4	962	1,030	1,041	1,050	1,063	1,205	1,335
Conservative	Amanda Stewart (incumbent)	16.7	921	1,017	1,019	1,039	1,066	1,141	
Labour	Stewart Moohan	12.7	700	758	770	774	785		
Scottish Christian	Bob Handyside	1.1	59	70	71	79			
UKIP	Mitch Sorbie	0.8	42	59	61				
Scottish Socialist	Neil Scott	0.6	34	40					
Electorate: 10,801 Valid: 5,499 Spoilt: 28 Quota: 1,375 Turnout: 50.91%

- = Sitting Councillor from a different Ward.

=== Bearsden South ===
- 2007: 1xCon; 1xSNP; 1xLib Dem
- 2012: 1xLib Dem; 1xSNP; 1xLab
- 2007-2012: Lab gain one seat from Con

Bearsden South – 3 seats
Party	Candidate	FPv%	Count					
Party	Candidate	FPv%	1	2	3	4	5	6
Liberal Democrats	Vaughan Moody (incumbent)	26.8	1,309					
SNP	Keith Small	25.4	1,243					
Labour	Manjinder Shergill	20.4	996	1,022	1,028	1,046	1,178	1,408
Conservative	David Mason	19.2	937	963	966	1,018	1,049	
Green	Scott Ferguson	5.0	247	263	272	292		
Scottish Christian	Christine Cormack	2.5	124	127	129			
Electorate: 10,452 Valid: 4,856 Spoilt: 28 Quota: 1,215 Turnout: 46.46%

=== Campsie & Kirkintilloch North ===
- 2007: 1xEDIA; 1xLab; 1xSNP
- 2012: 1xEDIA; 1xLab; 1xSNP
- 2007-2012 Change: No change

Campsie & Kirkintilloch North – 3 seats
Party	Candidate	FPv%	Count	
Party	Candidate	FPv%	1	2
EDIA	Charles Kennedy (incumbent) †	50.8	2,032	
Labour	John Dempsey (incumbent)	21.8	872	1,197
SNP	David Ritchie (incumbent)	20.3	813	1,066
Conservative	Andrew Lothian	4.6	183	253
Liberal Democrats	Morag Daly	2.4	97	155
Electorate: 8,948 Valid: 3,997 Spoilt: 47 Quota: 1,000 Turnout: 44.67%

=== Bishopbriggs North and Torrance ===
- 2007: 1xCon; 1xLab; 1xSNP
- 2012: 1xLab; 1xSNP; 1xCon
- 2007-2012 Change: No change

Bishopbriggs North and Torrance – 3 seats
Party	Candidate	FPv%	Count	
Party	Candidate	FPv%	1	2
Labour	Una Walker (incumbent)	29.7	1,557	
SNP	Anne McNair (incumbent)	26.4	1,384	
Conservative	Billy Hendry (incumbent)	24.4	1,279	1,316
Liberal Democrats	Cathy McInnes	12.1	633	693
Independent	Alan Brown	7.4	387	441
Electorate: 10,771 Valid: 5,240 Spoilt: 36 Quota: 1,311 Turnout: 48.65%

=== Bishopbriggs South ===
- 2007: 2xLab; 1xSNP
- 2012: 2xLab; 1xSNP
- 2007-2012 Change: No change

Bishopbriggs South – 3 seats
Party	Candidate	FPv%	Count	
Party	Candidate	FPv%	1	2
Labour	Alan Moir (incumbent)	32.8	1,267	
SNP	Gordan Low (incumbent)	29.9	1,158	
Labour	Michael O'Donnell (incumbent)	18.7	724	985
Conservative	Alisdair Sinclair	9.4	362	373
Liberal Democrats	Gary Pews	7.7	297	307
Scottish Socialist	Mark Callaghan	1.5	59	62
Electorate: 9,406 Valid: 3,930 Spoilt: 63 Quota: 967 Turnout: 41.78%

=== Lenzie & Kirkintilloch South ===
- 2007: 1xLab; 1xCon; 1xSNP
- 2012: 1xLab; 1xSNP; 1xCon
- 2007-2012 Change: No change

Lenzie & Kirkintilloch South – 3 seats
Party	Candidate	FPv%	Count	
Party	Candidate	FPv%	1	2
Labour	Rhondda Geekie (incumbent)	36.6	1,729	
SNP	Gillian Renwick (incumbent)	32.0	1,511	
Conservative	Anne Jarvis (incumbent)	24.0	1,133	1,240
Liberal Democrats	John Duncan	7.5	353	533
Electorate: 10,412 Valid: 4,726 Spoilt: 38 Quota: 1,182 Turnout: 45.39%

=== Kirkintilloch East & Twechar ===
- 2007: 1xLab; 1xEDIA; 1xSNP
- 2012: 1xLab; 1xEDIA; 1xSNP
- 2007-2012 Change: No change

Kirkintilloch East & Twechar – 3 seats
Party	Candidate	FPv%	Count		
Party	Candidate	FPv%	1	2	3
Labour	Stewart MacDonald (incumbent)	36.2	1,293		
EDIA	Jack Young (incumbent)	26.4	941		
SNP	John Jamieson (incumbent)	24.3	868	892	904
Labour	Jim Neill	6.8	241	571	583
Conservative	Alison Lothian	3.3	118	121	124
Liberal Democrats	Samantha Johnstone	1.8	66	70	72
Scottish Socialist	Willie Telfer	1.1	41	47	51
Electorate: 8,918 Valid: 3,568 Spoilt: 72 Quota: 893 Turnout: 40.01%

== Aftermath ==
Following the election, the Labour Party led a three-party coalition administration with the Liberal Democrats and the Conservatives, replacing the previous Labour/Conservative coalition that had run the council from 2007 to 2012. The leader of the council remained Labour councillor Rhondda Geekie, and Labour councillor Una Walker became provost. The depute leader and depute provost were the Lib Dem councillor Ashay Ghai and the Conservative councillor Anne Jarvis.

Following a disagreement between the Liberal Democrats and their administration colleagues, the ruling three-party coalition reverted to a minority two-party Labour/Conservative coalition in January 2016, and the Conservatives' Billy Hendry resumed the role of depute council leader.

== Post Election Changes ==
- † Campsie and Kirkintilloch North EDIA Cllr Charles Kennedy died on 13 July 2012. The by-election was held on 14 September 2012 and was won by Labour's Gemma Welsh.

== By Elections since 2012 ==
Campsie & Kirkintilloch North By-election (14 September 2012) - 1 Seat
Party	Candidate	FPv%	Count				
Party	Candidate	FPv%	1	2	3	4	5
Labour	Gemma Welsh	30.8	851	860	874	939	1,146
SNP	Billy Hutchinson	26.9	743	762	767	845	1,044
Liberal Democrats	Susan Murray	25.0	693	702	740	788	
Independent	Brian Reid	9.9	274	284	318		
Conservative	Alisdair Sinclair	5.1	141	143			
Green	Ross Greer	2.3	65				
Labour gain from EDIA		Swing					
Electorate: 9,277 Valid: 2,767 Spoilt: 28 Quota: 1,384 Turnout: 2,795 (30.1%)
