= 1999 Pulitzer Prize =

Awards for journalism and related fields

The Pulitzer Prizes for 1999 were announced on April 12, 1999.

== Journalism awards ==
- Public Service:
  - The Washington Post, "for its series that identified and analyzed patterns of reckless gunplay by city police officers who had little training or supervision."
- Breaking News Reporting:
  - Staff of The Hartford Courant, "for its clear and detailed coverage of a shooting rampage in which a Connecticut Lottery employee killed four supervisors, then himself."
- Investigative Reporting:
  - Staff of The Miami Herald, "for its detailed reporting that revealed pervasive voter fraud in a city mayoral election, that was subsequently overturned."
- Explanatory Reporting:
  - Richard Read, The Oregonian, "for vividly illustrating the domestic impact of the Asian economic crisis by profiling the local industry that exports frozen french fries."
- Beat Reporting:
  - Chuck Philips and Michael A. Hiltzik, the Los Angeles Times, "for their stories on corruption in the entertainment industry, including a charity sham sponsored by the National Academy of Recording Arts and Sciences, illegal detoxification programs for wealthy celebrities, and a resurgence of radio payola."
- National Reporting:
  - Staff of The New York Times, and notably Jeff Gerth, "for a series of articles that disclosed the corporate sale of American technology to China, with U.S. government approval despite national security risks, prompting investigations and significant changes in policy."
- International Reporting:
  - Staff of The Wall Street Journal, "for its in-depth, analytical coverage of the 1998 Russian financial crisis."
- Feature Writing:
  - Angelo B. Henderson, The Wall Street Journal, "for his portrait of a druggist who is driven to violence by his encounters with armed robbery, illustrating the lasting effects of crime."
- Commentary:
  - Maureen Dowd, The New York Times, "for her fresh and insightful columns on the impact of President Clinton's affair with Monica Lewinsky."
- Criticism:
  - Blair Kamin, the Chicago Tribune, "for his lucid coverage of city architecture, including an influential series supporting the development of Chicago's lakefront area."
- Editorial Writing:
  - Editorial Board, the New York Daily News, "for its effective campaign to rescue Harlem's Apollo Theater from the financial mismanagement that threatened the landmark's survival."
- Editorial Cartooning:
  - David Horsey, Seattle Post-Intelligencer
- Spot News Photography:
  - Staff of the Associated Press, "for its portfolio of images following the embassy bombing in Kenya and Tanzania that illustrates both the horror and the humanity triggered by the event."
- Feature Photography:
  - Staff of the Associated Press, "for its striking collection of photographs of the key players and events stemming from President Clinton's affair with Monica Lewinsky and the ensuing impeachment hearings."

== Letters awards ==
- Fiction:
  - The Hours by Michael Cunningham (Farrar, Straus & Giroux)
- History:
  - Gotham: A History of New York City to 1898 by Edwin G. Burrows and Mike Wallace (Oxford University Press)
- Biography or Autobiography:
  - Lindbergh by A. Scott Berg (G.P. Putnam's Sons)
- Poetry:
  - Blizzard of One by Mark Strand (Alfred A. Knopf)
- General Nonfiction:
  - Annals of the Former World by John McPhee (Farrar)

== Arts awards ==
- Drama:
  - Wit by Margaret Edson (Faber and Faber)
- Music:
  - Concerto for Flute, Strings and Percussion by Melinda Wagner (Theodore Presser Company)

Premiered on May 30, 1998, in Purchase, New York by the Westchester Philharmonic, and commissioned by that orchestra for Paul Lustig Dunkel.

== Other awards ==
- Special Citation:
  - Duke Ellington

"Bestowed posthumously on Edward Kennedy "Duke" Ellington, commemorating the centennial year of his birth, in recognition of his musical genius, which evoked aesthetically the principles of democracy through the medium of jazz and thus made an indelible contribution to art and culture."
