= Jennifer Margaret Barker =

Scottish-American classical composer and pianist

Jennifer Margaret Barker (born 6 May 1965 in Glasgow, Scotland) is a Scottish-American classical composer and pianist. Her compositional style is highly influenced by the landscape, culture and musical heritage of Scotland. She is Professor Emerita of Composition and Theory at the University of Delaware. Her music has been recorded on the Naxos Records, Composers Recordings Inc., New World Records, Albany Records, Meyer Media and PnOVA Recordings labels. She is published by Boosey & Hawkes, Theodore Presser Company, Vanderbeek & Imrie Ltd., Southern Percussion and McKenna-Keddie Publishing.

== Biography ==
Raised in Blanefield, Stirlingshire, Barker studied composition with Scottish composer, John Maxwell Geddes at the University of Glasgow (B.Mus. Hons.), before crossing the Atlantic for graduate studies with American Pulitzer prize-winning composers Melinda Wagner and George Crumb at Syracuse University (M.M.) and the University of Pennsylvania (A.M., Ph.D.) respectively. She also worked with British composers Sir Peter Maxwell Davies and Judith Weir on the 1992 Scottish Chamber Orchestra's Young Composers Course in Orkney, and with American composers Daniel Strong Godfrey and Jay Reise. In 2021 she was named the recipient of the Delaware Division of the Arts Masters Fellowship for Artistic Excellence and Service to the State. Further awards in composition include the 2022 Miriam Gideon Prize from the International Alliance for Women in Music, winner of the 2022 New Ariel Recordings Composition Competition (USA), winner of the 2018 Pi Kappa Lambda Chamber Commission (USA), the 2007 Individual Artist Established Fellowship for Artistic Excellence by the Delaware Division of the Arts and Delaware State Arts Council, winner of the 2006 Relâche (musical group) Philadelphia Commissions Project (USA), winner of the 1996 Cambridge Contemporary Music Festival Composition Competition (UK), winner of the 1993 Helen L. Weiss Music Prize for Composition awarded by the University of Pennsylvania (USA), finalist in the 1998-99 AUROS Group for New Music Composition Competition (USA), and finalist in the 1993 Huddersfield Contemporary Music Festival Young Composers Award (UK). Barker has also received awards in 2019, 2020 and 2023 from The American Prize.

As a pianist, she studied with Lawrence Glover, Gustav Fenyö and Anne Crawford at the Royal Conservatoire of Scotland, and with George Pappastavrou at Syracuse University and Gary Spielstead, of The University of Western Ontario, Canada. She studied violin with J. Mullen Begbie (Concertmaster of the Royal Scottish National Orchestra) and Angus Andersen (Concertmaster of the Scottish Chamber Orchestra), and oboe with Phillip Hill (Principal Oboist with the BBC Scottish Symphony Orchestra). As a young pianist Barker won many awards at the Edinburgh Competition Festival and Glasgow Music Festival, most notably the ECF’s 1983 William Townsend Memorial Senior Medal, the 1979/1981/1982 Norma Dalziel Chamber Trophies, and the 1977 Marion P. Gibb Prize. She was also awarded the Associated Board of the Royal Schools of Music’s 1979 Lindsay Lamb Memorial Bursary.

She is related through her aunt to British abstract artist, Wilhelmina Barns-Graham. Her niece, Peigi Barker, is the voice of Young Merida in Pixar Animation Studios' Brave (2012 film). Her sister-in-law, Eilidh Mackenzie, is 2010 Scots Trad Music Awards Gaelic Singer of the Year and former member of Mac-Talla. Mackenzie is featured on two of Barker's recordings: Geodha on her Nyvaigs CD and Tìrean cèin (Distant Shores), a multimedia crossover work.

== Works and performances ==
Notable amongst Barker's catalogue is her work for children's chorus and symphony orchestra, titled Nollaig, which has received performances from the Saint Louis Symphony Orchestra with the St. Louis Children's Chorus, the Detroit Symphony Orchestra, the New Jersey Symphony Orchestra with the New Jersey Youth Choirs, the Virginia Symphony Orchestra with the Virginia Children’s Chorus, the Fort Collins Symphony, the Champaign-Urbana Symphony Orchestra with the Central Illinois Children's Chorus, and the Lynchburg Symphony with Cantate Children’s and Youth Choir of Central Virginia. Nollaig was commissioned by the Virginia Children's Chorus with the Virginia Symphony and premiered under the baton of Wes Kenney at Hampton Coliseum in Hampton Roads, Virginia, USA to an audience of just under 10,000 people. With permission from the composer, a chamber version of this work was created by Dr. Betty Bertaux, director of The Children’s Chorus of Maryland, for publication on her Boosey & Hawkes choral series. Further choral-instrumental works include Harmony of Angels, commissioned and premiered by the Bearsden Choir with the BBC Scottish Symphony Orchestra Brass and Percussion, and Ealasaid, premiered by 6-WIRE and the University of Delaware Chorale at Carnegie Hall in New York.

Described as “a haunting journey through a woman’s experience of life and love”, Barker’s song-cycle for soprano, flute and piano setting four poems by Robert Burns, titled A Lassie’s Love, has been recorded on the Meyer Media LLC label. Commissioned by Scottish ensemble, Vocali3e, the creation of the work, and subsequent concert tours of the work in Scotland and America, were supported by grants from Creative Scotland, The Jean Armour Burns Trust, The National Trust for Scotland, Made in Scotland Onward Touring Fund and the Delaware Division for the Arts, USA. The work was premiered at The Robert Burns Birthplace Museum in Ayrshire, Scotland in May 2015. The review of the 2016 Victoria International Arts Festival performance in Malta describes the cycle as “a very beautiful song cycle, alternating from the light-hearted and flirtatious nature of a young girl to the more introspective and mature musings of an older woman”.

Also of note in Barker’s portfolio of compositions is her composition for flute and piano titled Na Trì Peathraichean (The Three Sisters…of Glencoe) which “impressionistically evoke(s) the landscape and atmosphere of three neighbouring mountain ridges in the Scottish Highlands”. Originally commissioned and recorded by Virginia Symphony flautist, Laurie Baefsky, for the inaugural CD release of the Meyer Media label (2000), this work has recently been recorded by award-winning international Powell Flutes artist, Alice K. Dade, for Naxos Records (2018). With a YouTube video of the first movement of the work, Gearr Aonach, reaching almost half a million views, this composition has been reviewed as “evocative and virtuosic at the same time”; “impressive…a vivid landscape of colors and textures…majestic…richly evocative”; “very attractive”; “a wonderfully atmospheric piece, denoting the gentle wind (that) rustles through the crevices and the ferns, truly evocative and haunting.”

With undergraduate and graduate degrees in piano performance, Barker's continued work as a collaborative pianist is highly evident in her writing for piano. Martin Jones (pianist) has recorded two of her three compositions for solo piano, Moana and BuMian, on the PnOVA: American Piano Music Series. American pianist Kevin Robert Orr has recorded her solo piano work, Geenyoch Ballant, and also performed it to critical review in America, Europe and Asia: “Orr then went on to play a much more modern work by Jennifer Margaret Barker. It…took full advantage of the basically percussive nature of the modern piano. There were echoes of Carl Orff, Shostakovich, Copland, and even Mahler, to be heard throughout the piece. But in the end, it was clearly Barker’s own.” Geenyoch Ballant was written for the 2003 American Liszt Society National Conference. In addition, American composer, Melinda Wagner, engaged Barker to create the piano reduction of her 1999 Pulitzer Prize-winning work, Concerto for Flute, Strings, and Percussion, for publication by the Theodore Presser Company.

Among Barker’s more Celtic-flavoured compositions are two works setting the poetry of Scottish poet and academic, Derick Thomson. The first work, Geodha, is a chamber work for string trio and timpano utilizing material from an earlier, larger work inspired by and named for Thomson’s poem Geodha Air Chùl Na Grèine. The second work sets the poetry of Seann Oràn within a work for flute and acoustic guitar. On Barker’s Nyvaigs CD, one can hear Thomson reciting his poem, Geodha Air Chùl Na Grèine, followed by Barker’s setting of the poem in song, performed by Eilidh Mackenzie.

== Discography ==
- Nyvaigs, Composer's Recording Inc./New World Records, CRI862, NWCR862 (2000)
- Geenyoch, Meyer Media MMV01001 (2005)
- Golden Thread, Virginia Children's Chorus (2005)
- 6ixth Sense, Ting-Ting, China (2013)
- Excursions, Meyer Media, MM14028 (2013)
- PnOVA: American Piano Music Series, Volume 2, Mahin Media (2016)
- A Lassie's Love, Meyer Media (2017)
- Living Music, Naxos 8.559831 (2018)
- Almost All-American: 21st Century Works for Clarinet, Albany Records TROY1788 (2019)
- 6-Wire on 57th, Meyer Media MM21045 (2021)
- Contemporary Eclectic Music for the Piano, Volume 22, New Ariel Recordings (2022)
- Transcontinental: Music Without Borders, Meyer Media MM23054 (2024)
- Eredità/Legacy: New Music for Trumpet #13, AZ2025 Olivotto Marco (2025)

== Sources ==
- https://britishmusiccollection.org.uk/composer/jennifer-margaret-barker
- Barker, "Jennifer Margaret Barker", Homestead, www.jennifermargaretbarker.com, Accessed 29 July 2018.
- https://www.boosey.com/cr/catalogue/ps/powersearch_results.cshtml?search=Bertaux, Accessed 29 July 2018
- The Contemporary Hornist, "umurangi-kikorangi", Robert Patterson, 2016, www.robertgpatterson.com/the-contemporary-hornist/, Accessed 31 July 2018.
- American Society of Composers, Authors and Publishers, www.ascap.com, Accessed 31 July 2018.
- Victoria International Arts Festival, "Transcending boundaries with Transcontinental", 28 July 2018, www.viaf.org.mt/transcending-boundaries-with-transcontinental/, Accessed 31 July 2018.
- Meyer Media, "Artists", www.meyer-media.com/jennifermbarker/index.shtml, Accessed 31 July 2018
- Victoria International Arts Festival, "Composer/Pianist Jennifer Margaret Barker in concert with Caraid Trì", 16 July 2016, www.viaf.org.mt/composerpianist-jennifer-margaret-barker-in-concert-with-caraid-tri/. Accessed 1 August 2018
- Floyd, James Michael, "Composers in the Classroom: A Bio-Bibliography of Composers at Conservatories, Colleges, and Universities in the United States", pub. Scarecrow Press Inc., UK, 2011
