= Tamar Muskal =

Israeli-American composer (born 1965)

- תמר מוסקל
- Born: 1965 (age 60–61); Jerusalem, Israel
- Education: Jerusalem Academy of Music and Dance; Yale University; City University of New York
- Occupation: Composer
- Spouse: Danny Rozin
- Awards: Guggenheim Fellowship (2009)
- Musical career
- Genres: Contemporary classical music

Tamar Muskal (Hebrew: תמר מוסקל; born 1965) is an Israeli-American composer. She received a Pulitzer Prize nomination for her 2005 piece The Yellow Wind. She was composer-in-residence for the Westchester Philharmonic and is a 2009 Guggenheim Fellow.

== Biography ==
Tamar Muskal was born in Jerusalem in 1965 and obtained her BA from the Jerusalem Academy of Music and Dance. She and her husband emigrated to the United States, where she went on to do her master studies at Yale University and the City University of New York. Her teachers include Mark Kopytman, Martin Bresnick, Jacob Druckman, Ezra Laderman, David Del Tredici, Tania Leon, and Paul Lustig Dunkel.

In 2005, she premiered The Yellow Wind, her hour-long Westchester Philharmonic commission themed after Israel–Palestine relations, at the State University of New York at Purchase Performing Arts Center; Anne Midgette of The New York Times called it "a huge opener for a large-scale program". She also received a Pulitzer Prize nomination for The Yellow Wind. When her piece Mirrors, commissioned by Eighth Blackbird, was performed in Pittsburgh in February 2008, a Pittsburgh Tribune-Review review said that "music from Alfred Hitchcock's film Spellbound must have been playing in Muskal's mind when she wrote one section of this piece".

She composed "Mar de Leche", the third track of Maya Beiser's 2010 album Provenance. She and Barbara Harbach provided original scores for a 2016 Women in Film & Television screening of some of Alice Guy-Blaché's silent films. She did the last tracks of the four-composer flute album Alive in the Studio. She composed "Where Do We Belong? A Conversation with Bach" in the album New for Violin & Piano; the American Record Guide said that "Muskal's intellectual conversation with Bach is palpable here".

In 2017, she did a piece commemorating Sojourner Truth, commissioned by Close Encounters With Music. Another Close Encounters With Music commission, One Earth, premiered in November 2022 after being delayed due to the COVID-19 pandemic.

She spent years as composer-in-residence for the Westchester Philharmonic education program. In 2009, she was awarded a Guggenheim Fellowship.

As of 2001, Muskal was a resident of Manhattan. She holds dual American and Israeli citizenship. Her husband is artist Danny Rozin, with whom she collaborated for her Eighth Blackbird commission.
