= Physical computing =

Computing involving interactive systems

Physical computing involves interactive systems that can sense and respond to the world around them. While this definition is broad enough to encompass systems such as smart automotive traffic control systems or factory automation processes, it is not commonly used to describe them. In a broader sense, physical computing is a creative framework for understanding human beings' relationship to the digital world. In practical use, the term most often describes handmade art, design or DIY hobby projects that use sensors and microcontrollers to translate analog input to a software system, and/or control electro-mechanical devices such as motors, servos, lighting or other hardware.

Physical computing intersects the range of activities often referred to in academia and industry as electrical engineering, mechatronics, robotics, computer science, and especially embedded development.

Physical computing

== Examples ==
Physical computing is used in a wide variety of domains and applications. The most commonly known examples of physical computing are Arduino and Raspberry Pi. These examples allow you to program systems in order to interact with the real world, showing the relationship between the physical and digital world.

=== Commercial applications ===
Commercial implementations range from consumer devices such as the Sony Eyetoy or games such as Dance Dance Revolution to more esoteric and pragmatic uses including machine vision utilized in the automation of quality inspection along a factory assembly line. Exergaming, such as Nintendo's Wii Fit, can be considered a form of physical computing. Other implementations of physical computing include voice recognition, which senses and interprets sound waves via microphones or other sound-wave sensing devices, and computer vision, which applies algorithms to a rich stream of video data typically sensed by some form of camera. Haptic interfaces are also an example of physical computing, though in this case the computer is generating the physical stimulus as opposed to sensing it. Both motion capture and gesture recognition are fields that rely on computer vision to work their magic. Today, physical computing is being used for smart watches, drones, thermostats, and washing machines. Now, with the recent rise of artificial intelligence, robots are all being created through physical computing.

=== Scientific applications ===
Physical computing can also describe the fabrication and use of custom sensors or collectors for scientific experiments, though the term is rarely used to describe them as such. An example of physical computing modeling is the Illustris project, which attempts to precisely simulate the evolution of the universe from the Big Bang to the present day, 13.8 billion years later.

=== Art ===
In the art world, projects that implement physical computing include the work of Scott Snibbe, Daniel Rozin, Rafael Lozano-Hemmer, Jonah Brucker-Cohen, and Camille Utterback.

== Education ==
The advantage of physical computing in education has been reflected in diverse informal learning environments. The Exploratorium, a pioneer in inquiry based learning, developed some of the earliest interactive hardware involving computers, and continues to include more and more examples of physical computing and tangible interfaces as associated technologies progress.

Studies show a project on physical computing results in statistically significant improvements in students' computational thinking skills. This was also done as an effort to enlarge student interest in physical computing, as it has ever expanding real life implications.

For K-12 students, Scratch and MIT app inventor often act as gateways to more advanced platforms. These platforms use block-based coding to allow teens to interact with the digital world much more than other platforms. Organizations like Code.org created a program called "Hour of Code" in an attempt to give access to computing to students worldwide.

== Methods ==
Prototyping plays an important role in Physical computing. Arduino and Adafruit.io are relatively low-cost yet powerful methods of physical computing. Boards are often sold as DIY hardware, not for professional engineers, allowing for certain methods of physical computing to be accessible to anyone. With these platforms, users can build smart home devices with sensors, send data to the cloud and visualize information on the platforms dashboard. These platforms often rely on end-user development to function, making physical computing have more real-world implications and showing its versatility.

=== Product design ===
Physical computing practices also exist in the product and interaction design sphere, where hand-built embedded systems are sometimes used to rapidly prototype new digital product concepts in a cost-efficient way. Firms such as IDEO and Teague are known to approach product design in this way.
