= Temple, Glasgow =

Suburb of Glasgow, Scotland

Coordinates: 55.893008°N 4.326654°W

Temple
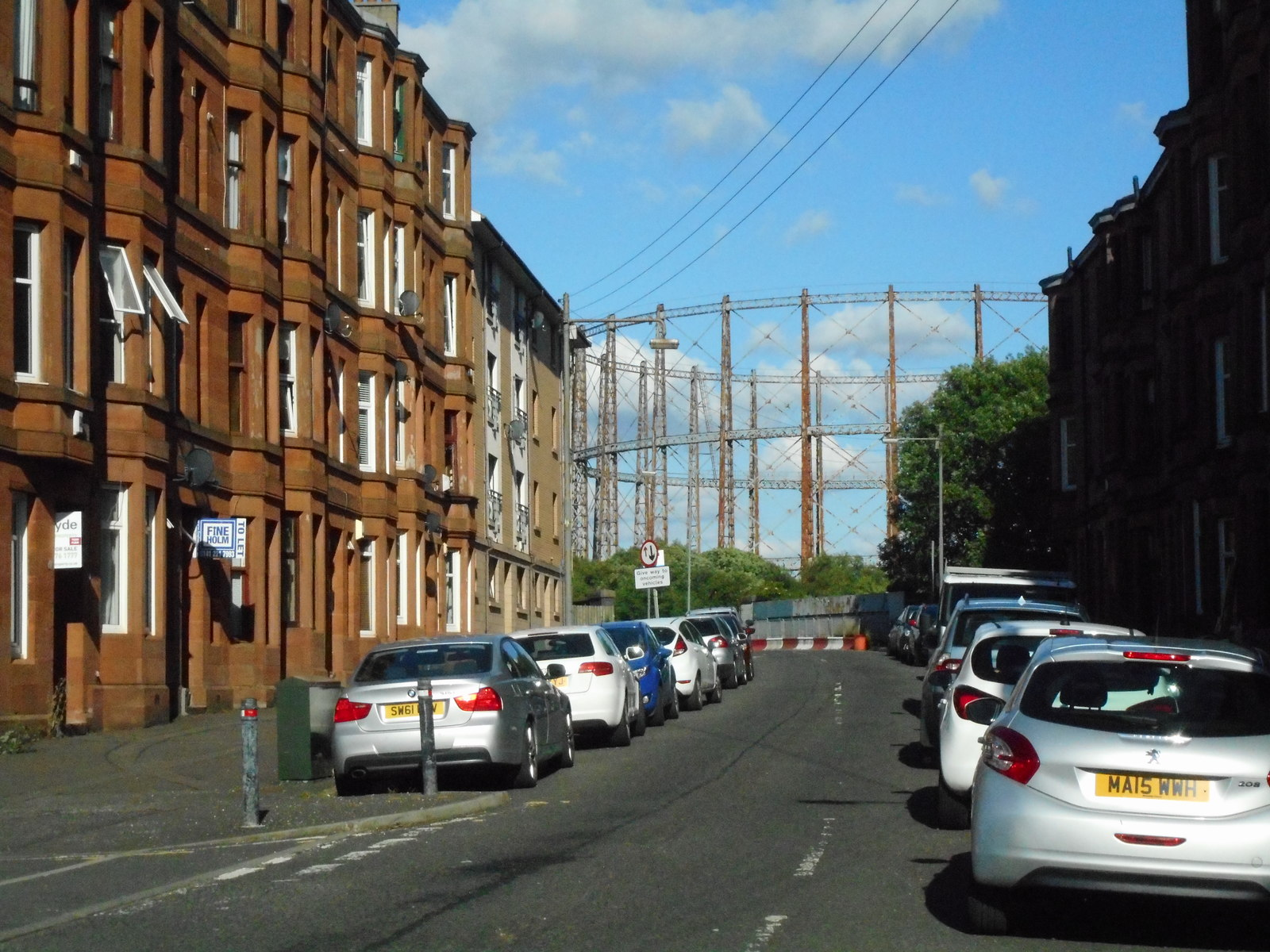
- Looking east past tenements on Strathcona Drive towards gas holders (2017)

- Location within Glasgow
- OS grid reference: NS546691
- Council area: Glasgow City Council
- Lieutenancy area: Glasgow
- Country: Scotland
- Sovereign state: United Kingdom
- Post town: GLASGOW
- Postcode district: G13 1
- Dialling code: 0141
- Police: Scotland
- Fire: Scottish
- Ambulance: Scottish
- UK Parliament: Glasgow North West
- Scottish Parliament: Glasgow Anniesland

Temple is a neighbourhood of Glasgow located in the north of the city, bounded by Anniesland to the south, Knightswood to the west and Kelvindale to the east; Netherton lies to the north. Temple appears in Joan Blaeu's 1662 Atlas of Scotland and many subsequent maps.

== History ==
Temple, like many of Glasgow's suburbs, was originally a village of its own, situated in the Parish of Kilpatrick, later New Kilpatrick in Dunbartonshire. It was swallowed by Glasgow's expansion in the late 19th and early 20th centuries. It was annexed by Glasgow in 1912. Mills were the primary employers in the old village, although coal was mined here for a period and transported to the River Clyde via the nearby Forth and Clyde Canal in Netherton.

Temple once had a parish church of its own within the Presbytery of Glasgow, staffed by assistant ministers from within New Kilpatrick parish. Temple Parish Church united with Anniesland to form Temple-Anniesland in 1984 and the original buildings are now demolished. Temple retains its Methodist church.

Temple has gone under a regeneration programme in the last fifteen years. Many new housing projects have been built, boosting the economic viability of the area.

== Amenities ==
Temple has its own park, Temple Park, a small playground for children and spans a large grassy field. The closest railway station is Anniesland. The Forth and Clyde Canal runs to the north of the neighbourhood; it is often used by local people for fishing. There is a David Lloyd leisure centre adjacent to the canal.

=== Schools ===
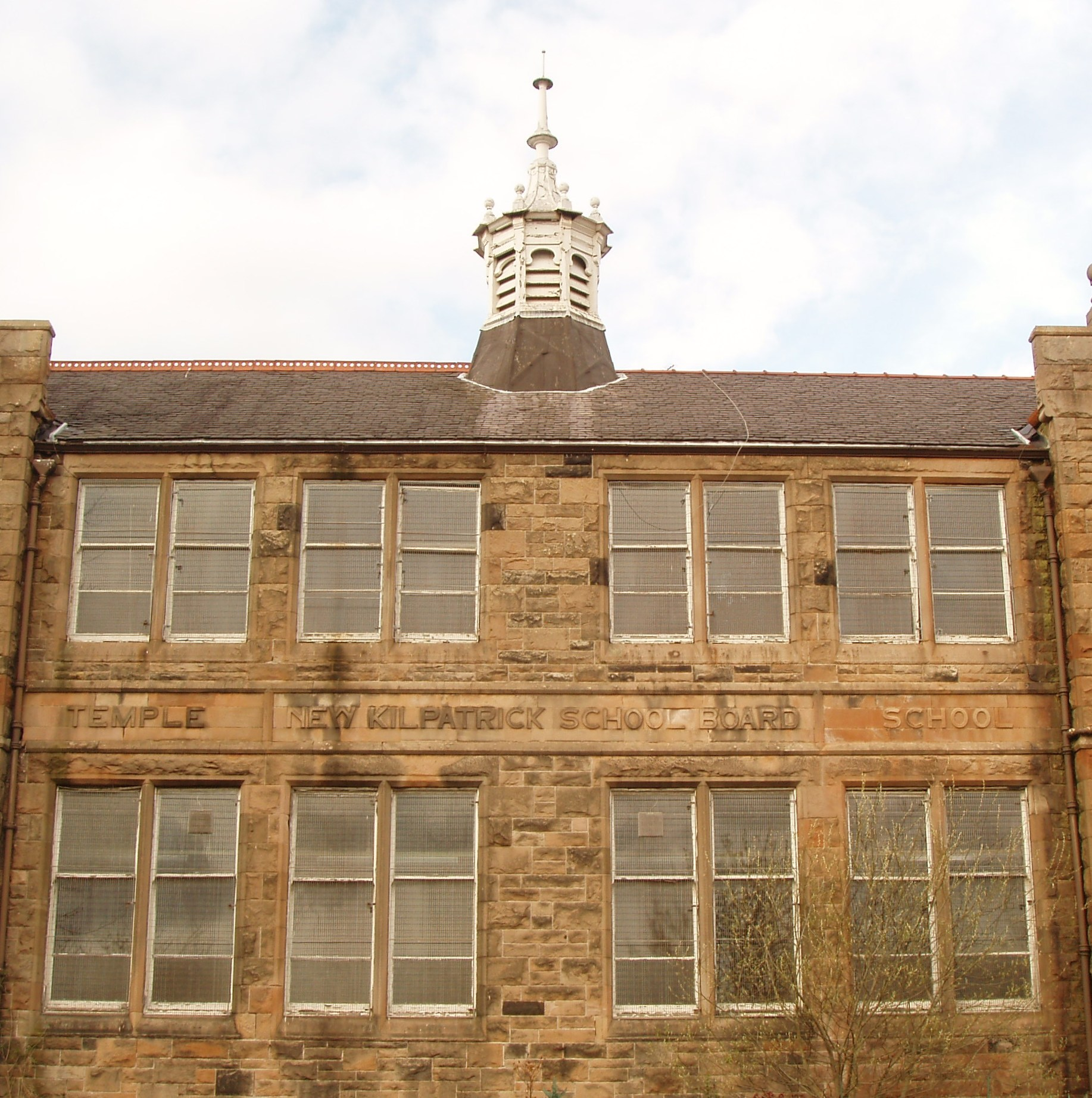
Former Temple Primary School, closed 2007

Temple Primary School was built in 1901 and closed in summer 2007. Nearby Knightswood Primary was upgraded to accommodate the transfer of pupils and staff. The Template building has now been converted to the 'Little Me' private Nursery School.

Temple/Shafton Youth Project is a long established project that has been in operation since 1987. It works with both young people and adults in the G13 area. In recent years they have raised thousands to take two groups of young people on world wide experiences to Australia in 2009 and 2011.

=== Shopping ===
Temple has several small stores, and also has a Morrison's (formerly one of Safeway's "Megastore" pilot stores) close by in Anniesland, and an Aldi at Temple Park.
