= Netherton, Glasgow =

Coordinates: 55.8975°N 4.3285°W

Netherton: Scots: Nethertoun
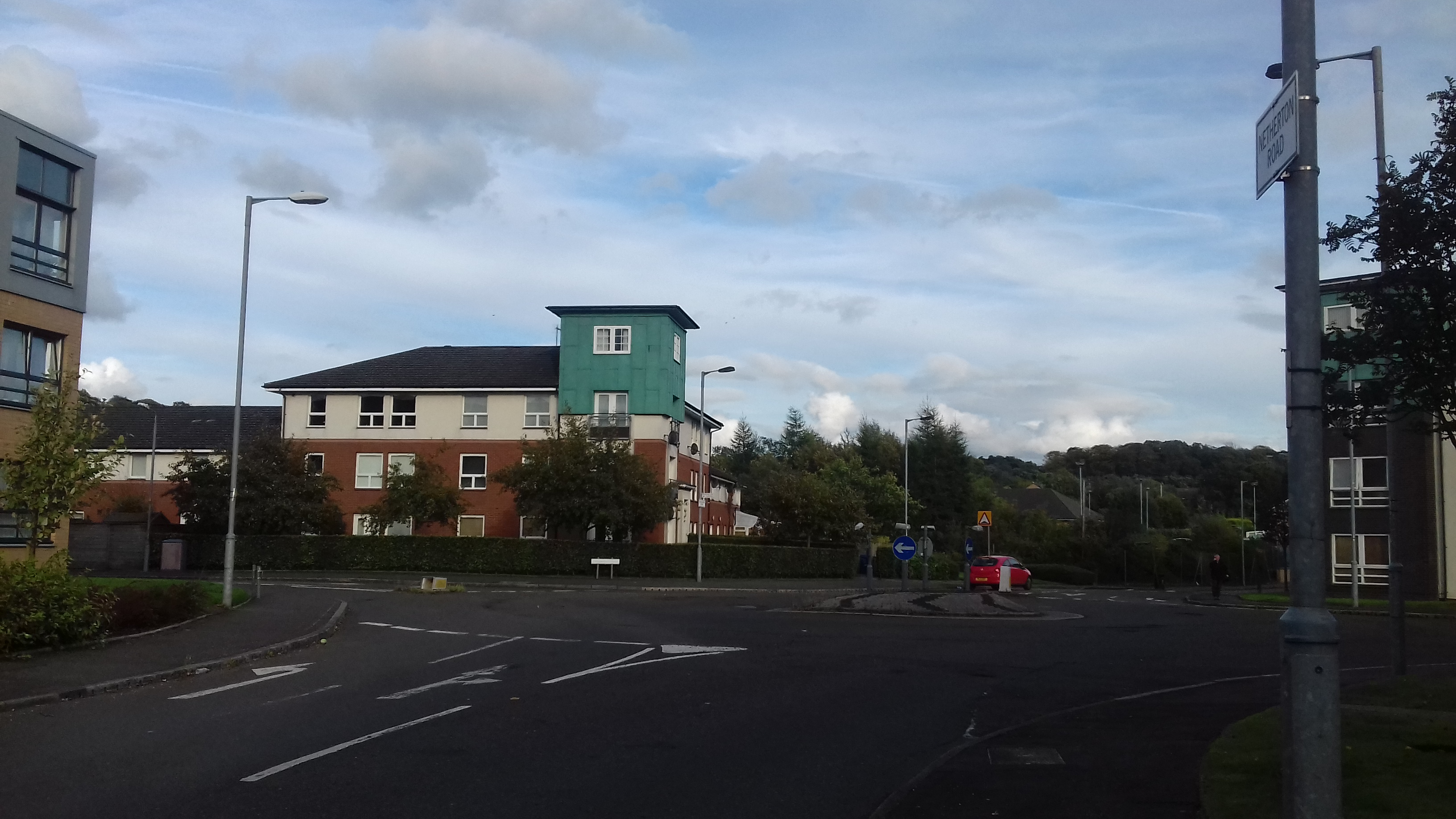
- Roundabout in Netherton (Netherton Road)

- Location within Glasgow
- OS grid reference: NS545696
- Council area: Glasgow City Council
- Lieutenancy area: Glasgow
- Country: Scotland
- Sovereign state: United Kingdom
- Post town: GLASGOW
- Postcode district: G13
- Dialling code: 0141
- Police: Scotland
- Fire: Scottish
- Ambulance: Scottish
- UK Parliament: Glasgow North West
- Scottish Parliament: Glasgow Anniesland

Netherton is a district of Glasgow, in the north of the city, bounded by Temple to the south, Knightswood to the west while Westerton in Bearsden lies to the North and East. Netherton appears in Joan Blaeu's 1662 Atlas of Scotland and many subsequent old maps. It is currently not shown on Ordnance Survey maps greater than 1:25000 scale. The street was founded in around the 1930s (one hundred years ago). It is a street close by local shops, the hut, and a park district. Part of the city council.

== History ==
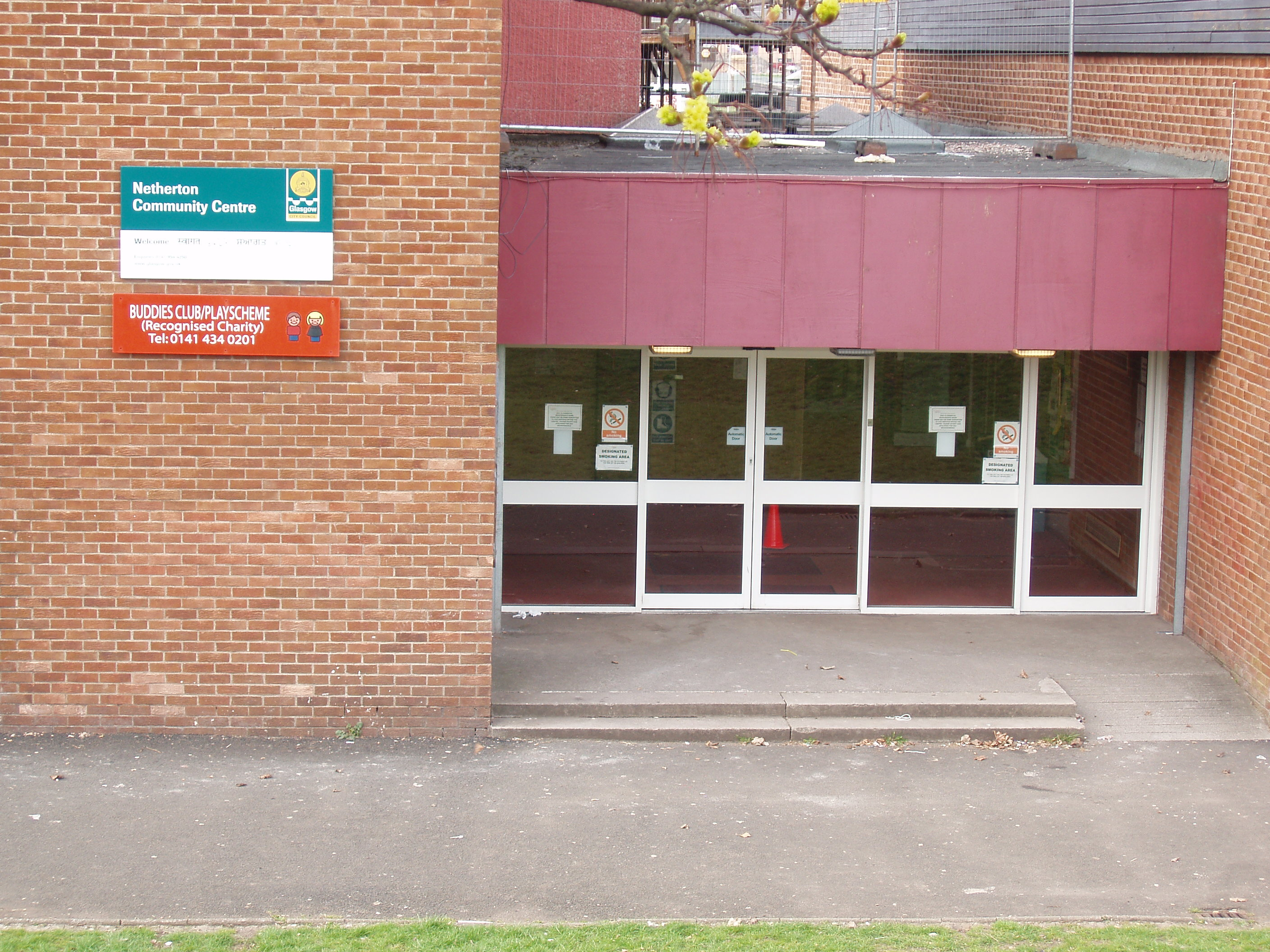
Netherton Community Centre

Netherton was originally a village of its own, situated in the Parish of Kilpatrick, later New Kilpatrick in Dunbartonshire. Local industry in the area during the early 19th century is recorded in the parish records as including a sandstone quarry in Netherton, supplying stone for the building of large local houses at Garscube and Blythswood, but was of sufficient quality to be exported overseas to Ireland and the West Indies.

The village was annexed by Glasgow's expansion in 1912, then completely absorbed in the 1920s when the Knightswood Estate was built. The name remains in use for the area, although it no longer has significance from an administrative perspective.

Several housing developments have been built in recent years, including Netherton Farm Lane, next to the Forth and Clyde Canal, and Netherton Gate, on part of the former industrial estate.

== Amenities ==
Netherton relies upon the surrounding communities for schooling and shopping. The former Anniesland Industrial Estate has been largely redeveloped, and includes new housing and several leisure facilities. Netherton Community Centre (run by Glasgow City Council) is situated in the area between Knightscliffe Avenue, Fulton Street and Netherton Road. The Community Centre is used by a Pentecostal church on Sunday mornings.
