= Helen L. Weiss =

Musical American composer, pianist, and choir director (1920–1948)

- Born: January 29, 1920; Brooklyn, New York, U.S.
- Died: February 20, 1948 (aged 28) Philadelphia, Pennsylvania, U.S.
- Occupations: Composer; choir director
- Instrument: Piano

Helen L. Weiss (January 29, 1920 – February 20, 1948) was an American composer, pianist, and choir director.

== Biography ==
Helen Weiss was born in Brooklyn, New York, to Samuel and Sadie (Friedman) Weiss. She had two brothers. The family moved to Philadelphia, where Weiss attended the Philadelphia High School for Girls. She earned a B.A. degree in music at the University of Pennsylvania in 1941; an M.A. in music at the University of Oklahoma in 1942; and a Ph.D. in music composition from the Eastman School of Music in 1944. She also studied music at the Philadelphia Conservatory (today the University of the Arts).

After getting her Ph.D., Weiss taught, composed, and performed as a piano soloist, accompanist, and choir director. She edited notes for the University of Pennsylvania Orchestra programs, was a secretary at the McGraw-Hill Publishing Company, and worked for the University of Pennsylvania Museum.

Weiss traveled to Peru in 1945, where she lectured, performed, and organized a choir at the Peruvian North American Cultural Institute. After becoming ill with cancer, she returned to the United States for treatment, which involved amputating her foot. She accepted a job with the U.S. State Department and returned to South America in March 1947. Her cancer recurred in November, and she came home to her family in Philadelphia and died in February 1948. Her papers and several recordings are archived at the University of Pennsylvania.

Weiss' family and friends created the Helen L. Weiss Music Prize at the University of Pennsylvania in 1964. It is awarded for the best vocal musical composition of each school year. Recipients have included composers Ingrid Arauco, Jennifer Margaret Barker, Boaz Ben-Moshe, Kai-Young Chan, Sharon Hershey, Myoung-jun Lee, Cerulean Payne Passmore, Hasan Uçarsu, James Ure, Ania Vu, and Ricardo Zohn-Muldoon.

== Selected works ==
- Chorale and Variations (piano)
- Declaration (orchestra and piano)
- I am the People (cantata for mixed chorus)
- Plaint
- Sonata in a minor
- Suite for Piano
- Three Poems for Voice and Orchestra (text by Walt Whitman)
