= Bearsden Choir =

Adult choir in Glasgow, Scotland

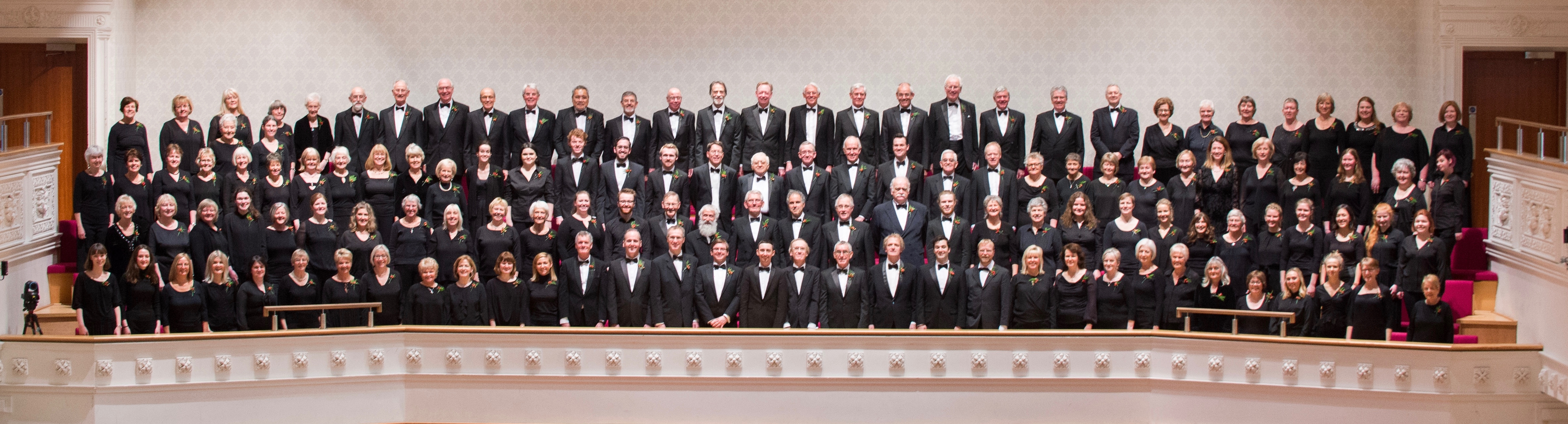
The Bearsden Choir November 2018

The Bearsden Choir (previously known as Bearsden Burgh Choir) is an amateur choir of some 120 mixed adult voices based in Glasgow, Scotland. It was formed in 1968 and performs both sacred and secular classical choral works. The singer Jamie MacDougall is its Honorary President. The choir has members of all ages and welcomes new singers. Auditions are held for applicants.

The Herald described it as one of Scotland's leading choirs.

== History ==
The choir was founded in 1968 by Harry MacGill, at the time organist of New Kilpatrick Church, with the initial objective giving a Christmas performance of Handel's Messiah. This was so successful that it was decided to keep the choir going on a permanent basis. Over the years, it expanded its programming and has become known for its "imaginative repertoire" and "high standards of performance". It has twice reached the finals of BBC2's Sainsbury's Choir of the year competition, won the four top awards for mixed choirs at the 1983 Blackpool Music Festival and in 2001 won the Glasgow Orpheus Choir Trophy at the Glasgow Music Festival.

The choir now performs two or three concerts each year with a professional accompaniment and soloists. It has been featured on television and radio, notably with the BBC Scottish Symphony Orchestra performing three contrasting versions of the Te Deum by Berlioz, Bruckner and Dvořák. The choir has done several Songs of Praise recordings, including the live broadcast at Glamis for the service of remembrance of Queen Elizabeth The Queen Mother. The choir has also recently made two sets of recordings for the BBC (see below)

As part of its Silver jubilee celebrations, the late Lord Menuhin conducted the choir in the first performance of Handel's Messiah in the Glasgow Royal Concert Hall.

In April 2000 the choir gave an unabridged account of St Matthew Passion in Glasgow Cathedral to mark the 250th anniversary of Bach's death. In 2003 the Choir presented a number of major concerts in Kelvingrove Art Gallery and Museum in aid of the Kelvingrove Refurbishment Appeal. It also played a leading role in the Gallery's opening concert in 2006. Earlier that year the Berlioz Te Deum, performed by the Bearsden and Paisley Abbey choirs, provided a test of the restored acoustics in the Glasgow City Halls with the venue's first choral concert since its renovation.

On 16 December 2018, the Bearsden Choir celebrated its 50th anniversary with a performance of Handel's Messiah at the Glasgow City Halls, Scotland and this was followed by a performance of the Bach B minor Mass in May 2019.

== New works ==
The choir has commissioned a variety of new choral works from contemporary composers. These have included The Lamb by Edward Harper, Harmony of Angels by Jennifer Margaret Barker, Ballade Pour Prier Nostre Dame by Martin Dalby and There was a lad by Glyn Bragg. In 2008, its 40th anniversary year, the choir commissioned a new work by Oliver Iredale Searle. The piece, 23.VII.32, was performed in both its forms, once with full orchestra and once with the reduced setting of piano, organ and percussion. The choir has also performed David Fanshawe's African Sanctus, Herbert Howells's Hymnus Paradisi, and Elgar's Dream of Gerontius, the only performance of the work in Scotland in 2012.

The choir commissioned and performed a new work by George Swann, 'Love Lies Beyond the Tomb' which was performed in May 2023 at the Glasgow City Halls. This earned a four star review in the Glasgow Herald Mr Swann is a member of the choir and to perform his piece and receive such an accolade was a great privilege.

== Organization ==
The Bearsden Choir has been a registered charity since 1980 and receives grants from the East Dunbartonshire Arts Council. Its principal staff have included:

- Musical Director

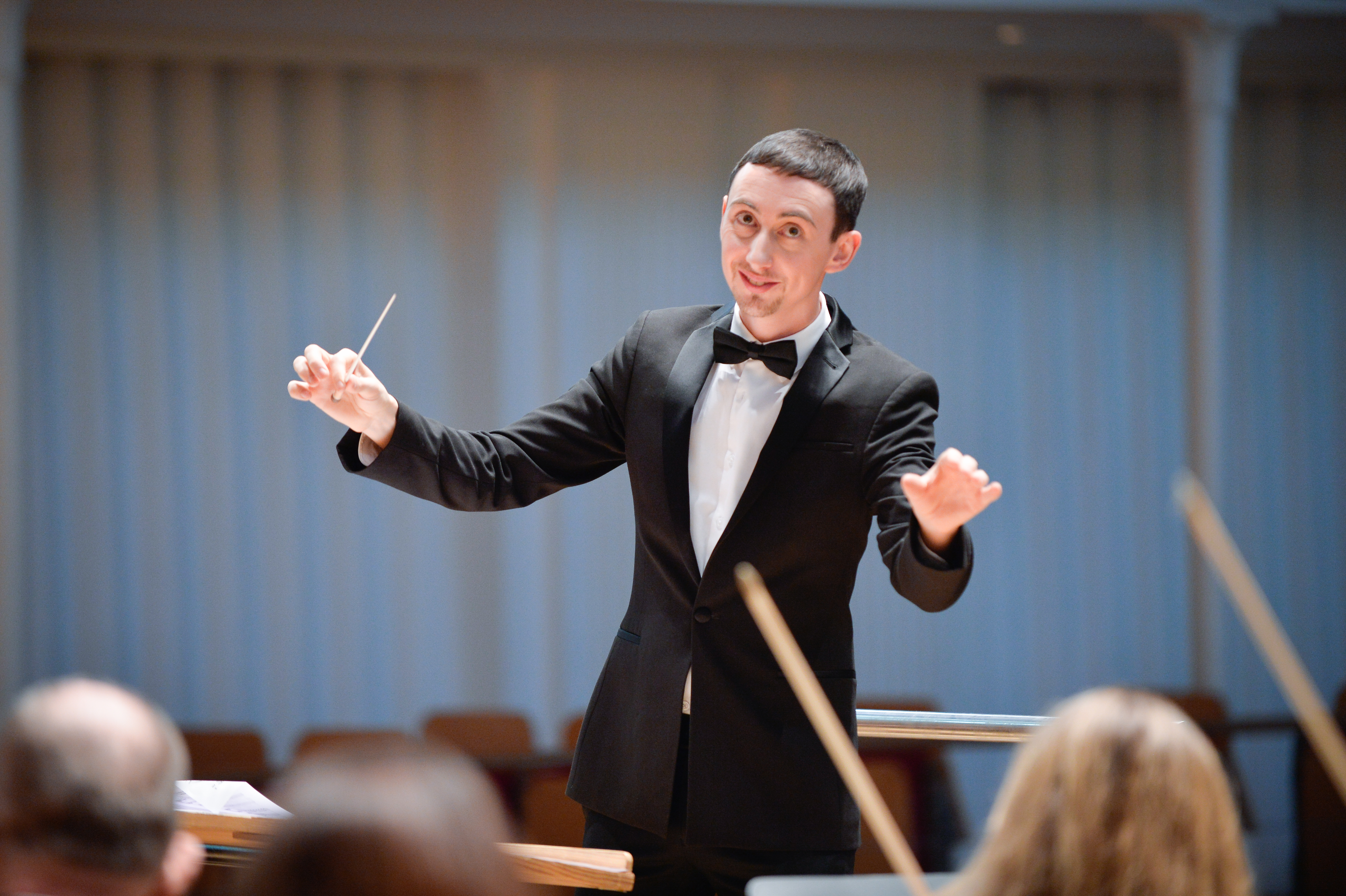
Andrew Nunn, Musical Director

The musical director is Andrew Nunn, under whom the choir has expanded its size, repertoire and reputation.

- Accompanist

Christopher Nickol (Nickol is also Director of Music at New Kilpatrick Church, Bearsden)

- Honorary President

Jamie MacDougall (Scottish tenor and TV personality)

== The Pandemic ==
The pandemic affected the choir as it did so many others so rehearsals moved to a virtual platform and throughout 2020 continued to meet every week for practice, chats and presentations. The latter included the composer John Rutter, the conductor Christopher Bell and many others. The choir also produced 'virtual' performances of two movements from Mendelssohn's Elijah, 'He That Shall Endure to the End' and 'He Watching Over Israel', in December 2020. This was mainly because the choir had been due to perform the entire work in May 2020, but the performance was of course cancelled.

In 2021 the choir restarted limited rehearsals under full covid precautions at Maryhill Burgh Hall. Space was limited, so in order to ensure proper social distancing only half the choir could rehearse at any one time. The pandemic continued to be challenging, and so in May 2021 the choir produced a longer 'virtual' work, Vivaldi's 'Gloria'. This was accompanied by the McOpera Orchestra who performed the accompaniment, with soloists, at the Trades' Hall, Glasgow with the choir singing individually and recording from home. The performance was released at the end of May 2021.

For the 2021-22 season the choir had a change of rehearsal venue, meeting at the Kingsborough Sanctuary Hyndland (formerly Hyndland Parish Church). The venue was large enough to let the whole choir rehearse together, although masking and distancing was carefully maintained. This enabled them to produce and record five carols for Christmas 2021, that were published on YouTube one a day with the last being on Christmas Day.

2022 and the subsequent easing of pandemic precautions meant that at last the choir could return to giving live performances. The first concert was in May 2022. Subsequent concerts have been at the Glasgow City Halls and the Glasgow Royal Concert Hall New Auditorium.

== Current Season 2023-24 ==
From September 2022 the choir was rehearsing every Wednesday night at 7:30pm in the Wellington Church, opposite Glasgow University. The choir was preparing for its summer concert, to be held on Sunday May 19, 2024 at 4pm at the City Halls Glasgow. Works were Arvo Pärt 'Salve Regina', George Swann 'Love Lies Beyond the Tomb' and Puccini 'Messe di Gloria', accompanied by the McOpera orchestra.

== Recordings ==
- Tam o' Shanter and Songs by Robert Burns. Bill McCue, Bearsden Burgh Choir, conducted by Renton Thomson. (The choral version of Robert Burns's "Tam o' Shanter" was composed by George MacIlwham.) Lismor RBLP 1790 (1979)
- Bearsden Choir Sings Choral Favourites. Produced by Acclaim Productions (2013)
- Works by Sir Michael Tippett from 'A Child Of Our Time' for the BBC as part of a biographical programme 'The Shadow and the Light', broadcast in June 2023 A review in the Daily Telegraph said:

'Glasgow's amateur Bearsden Choir rose magnificently to the challenge of his angular lines'.

- BBC recording of several Christmas pieces for 'Christmas on the Quay' 25 December 2023.
