= Proceed, Moon =

Proceed, Moon: Fantasy for Orchestra is an orchestral composition by the American composer Melinda Wagner. The work was Wagner's third commission from the Chicago Symphony Orchestra, which first performed the piece under the conductor Susanna Mälkki at the Symphony Center, Chicago, on June 15, 2017. Wagner dedicated the score to Mälkki and the Chicago Symphony Orchestra.

== Composition ==
Proceed, Moon has a duration of approximately 18 minutes and is cast in a single movement. The title of the piece is a quote from William Shakespeare's A Midsummer Night's Dream, though the composer noted that it has no programmatic meaning.

=== Instrumentation ===
The work is scored for a large orchestra consisting of three flutes (3rd doubling piccolo), three oboes (3rd doubling English horn), two clarinets, bass clarinet, bassoon, contrabassoon, four horns, three trumpets, two trombones, bass trombone, tuba, timpani, four percussionists, harp, piano, celesta, and strings.

== Reception ==
Reviewing the world premiere, Lawrence A. Johnson of the Chicago Classical Review called Proceed, Moon "a strong, audacious and compelling work," despite criticizing the score's duration and some of its effects. Alan Artner of the Chicago Tribune wrote:

At Thursday's final rehearsal, Wagner described the score in the terms of a tracking shot on a city street. People pass in and out of a primary figure's sphere of influence, giving the sense of hurtling activity. The atmosphere is decidedly urban, bustling and with an underlying tug of melancholy. A kind of resolution comes from a surprise electronic component I should not spoil. This works less well than Wagner intended. But Malkki and the orchestra successfully conveyed the work's intense drive as well as personal, uneasily twinkling calm.
