= New Kilpatrick =

Parish in Dunbartonshire, Scotland

Coordinates: 55.9197°N 4.3145°W

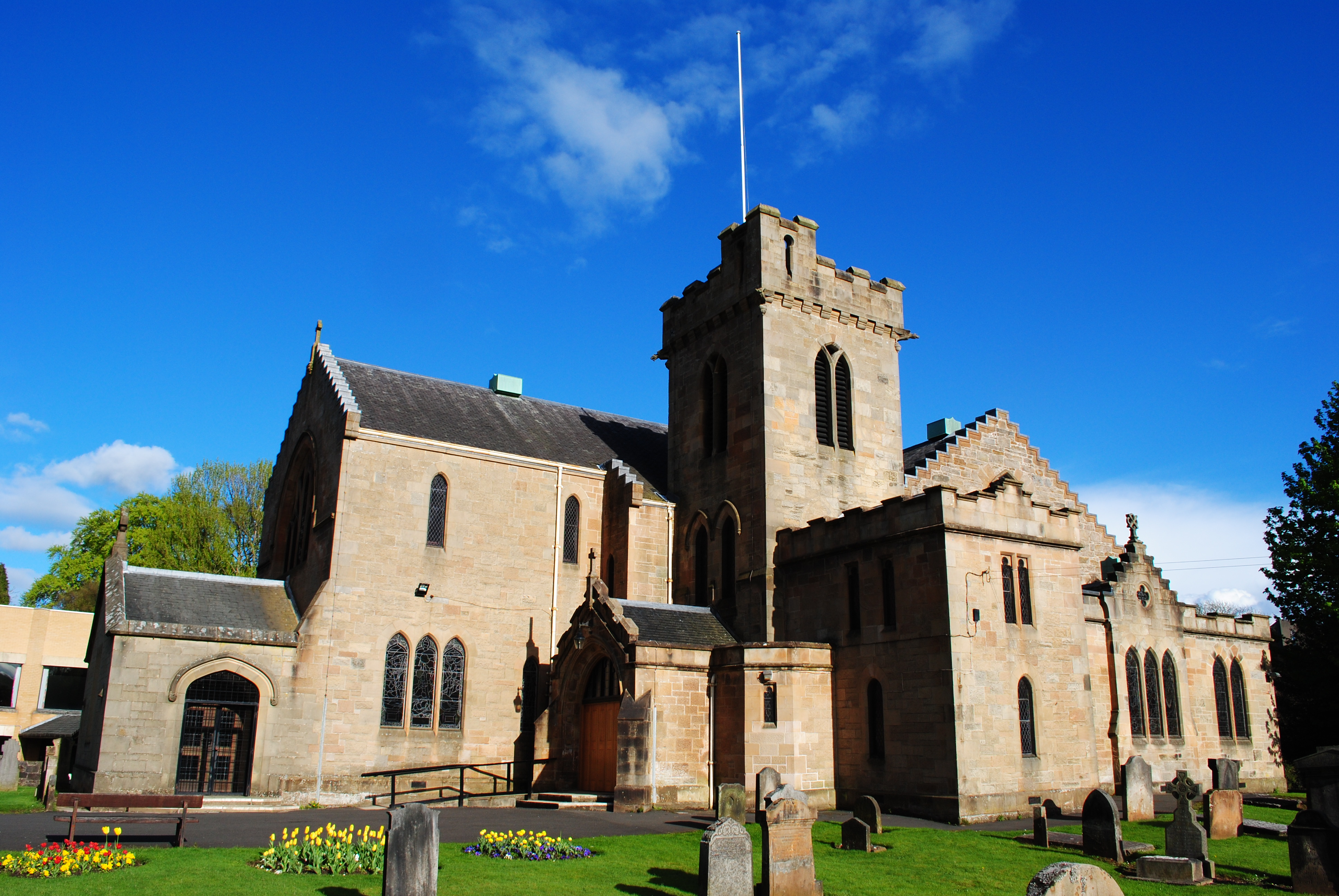
New Kilpatrick Parish Church, Bearsden, historical centre of administration for the parish.

New Kilpatrick, (also known as East Kilpatrick or Easter Kilpatrick) is an ecclesiastical Parish and former Civil Parish in Dunbartonshire. It was formed in 1649 from the eastern half of the parish of Kilpatrick (also known as Kirkpatrick), the western half forming Old Kilpatrick. New Kilpatrick is also a disused name for the town of Bearsden.

Originally spanning a large area from Strathblane in the North to Baldernock and Summerston (on the River Kelvin) in the East, down to Anniesland in the South and Yoker and Duntocher in the West, a quarter of the parish was once in the county of Stirlingshire. The geography of the area has supported mining, iron-working and quarrying in the past, but these are no longer economically viable, and much of the area functions as suburbs of Glasgow. Local government of the area was once the responsibility of the kirk, but is now administered by East Dunbartonshire, Glasgow and Stirlingshire councils. The name New Kilpatrick was dropped from general civil use in 1958 when Bearsden Burgh was formed. The previous extent of New Kilpatrick can be seen quite clearly on old maps, but current maps no longer show the former parish.

As the population of the area grew, the ecclesiastical parish reduced in area as smaller parishes were separated off and the parish now covers only a fraction of the town of Bearsden. The parish church was built in 1649 from local stone, and was replaced in 1807 with a larger building.

== History ==
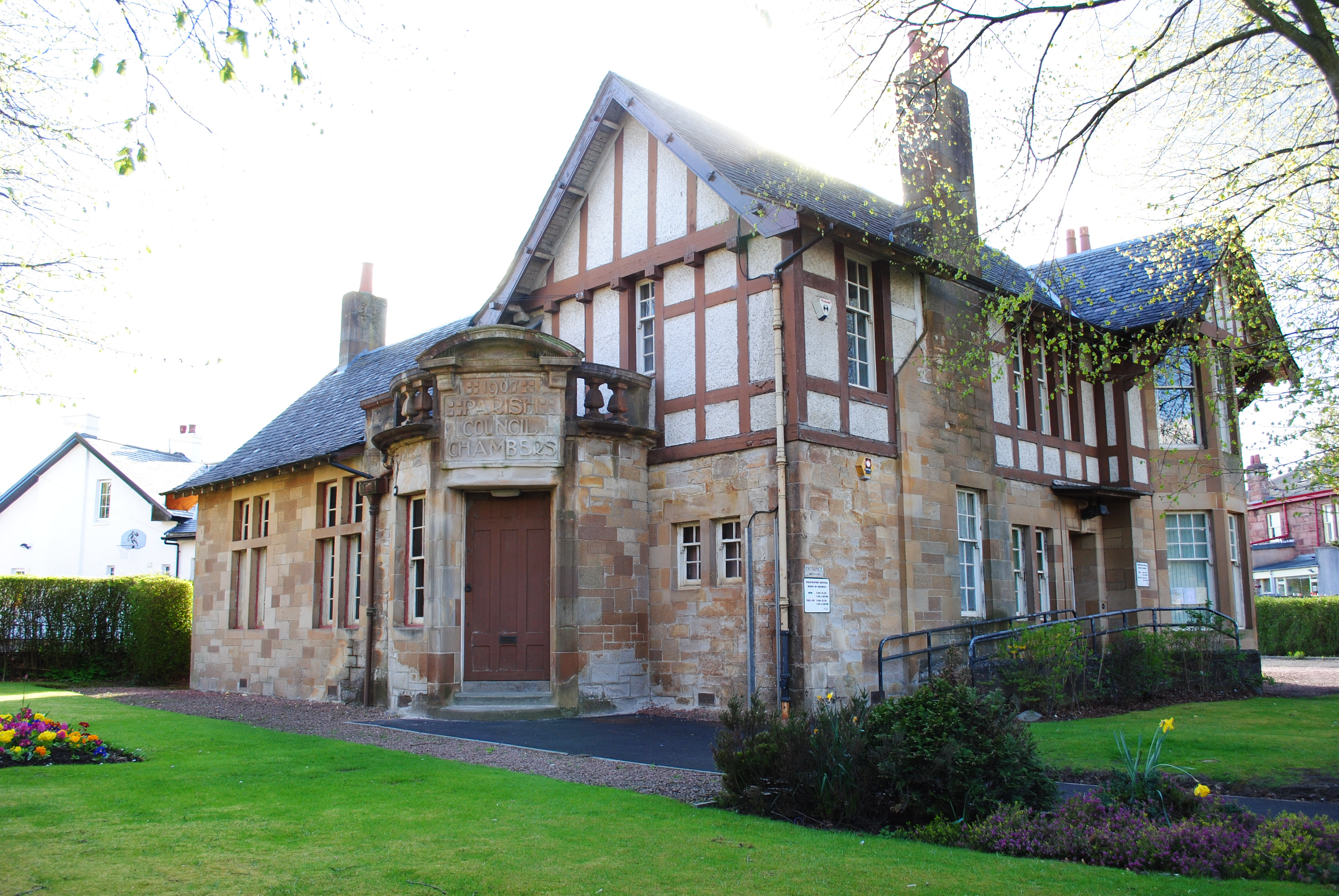
Former New Kilpatrick Parish Council Chambers, Bearsden, now in private ownership.

The parish system was introduced to Scotland in the 13th century. In about 1227, the church and lands of Kilpatrick were given to Paisley Abbey by Maldowen, Earl of Lennox. The name Kilpatrick is an Anglicised form of the Gaelic Cille Phàdraig - literally "Patrick's Churchyard". The alternative anglicised form "Kirkpatrick" is occasionally used in old texts. It is therefore reasonable to assume that a church dedicated to St Patrick gave the area its name before the transfer to Paisley Abbey. The parish remained under the supervision of the Abbey until the Reformation in 1560.

At the Dissolution, the Church property fell into the possession of Lord Sempill. Eventually the lands were conferred on Lord Claud Hamilton (a boy of ten), ancestor of the Dukes of Abercorn. His son James Hamilton was created Lord Abercorn on 5 April 1603, then on 10 July 1606 he was made Earl of Abercorn and Lord of Paisley, Hamilton, Mountcastell and Kilpatrick.

Kilpatrick was split into two parishes - Old (Wester or West) and New (Easter or East) by an Act of Parliament on 16 February 1649. This division is of note because this was a split of both the ecclesiastical and civil parishes and the wealth and stipend of the original parish was shared between the two new parishes. It was more common for new parishes to have "daughter" status, with wealth retained by the central, or cathedral church.

Since 1649 a succession of parishes have been separated from the original, with Drumchapel, Knightswood and Temple now within the City of Glasgow, while Milngavie and Baldernock lie in Dunbartonshire and Strathblane in Stirlingshire, and Drumry is considered part of Clydebank.

== Local government ==
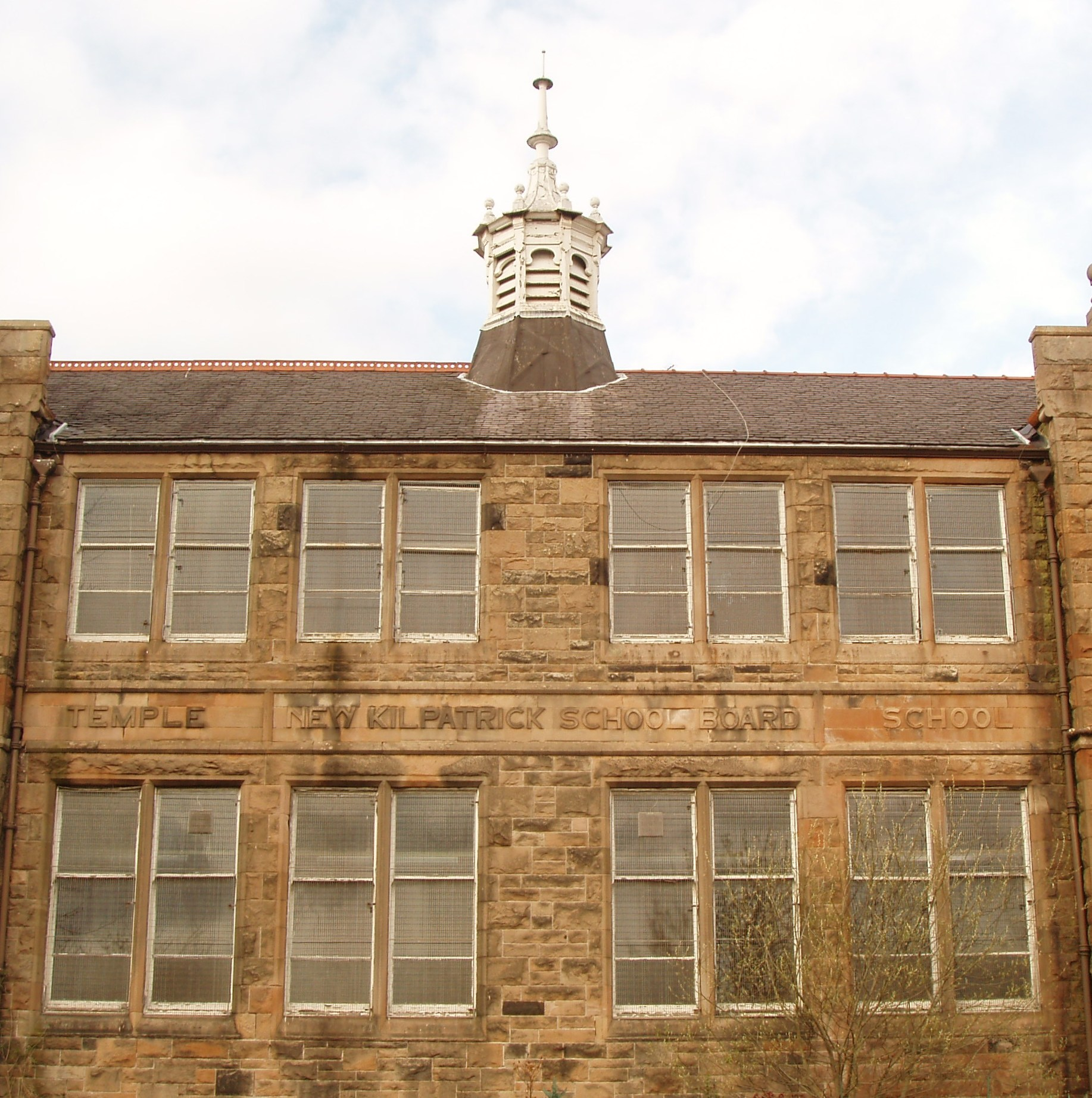
Former Temple Primary School, built by New Kilpatrick School Board with local stone from Netherton

For many years, the civil and ecclesiastical functions of the parish overlapped. For example, the kirk session dealt with minor misdemeanors, such as a man from Kirkton (New Kirk) fined for "swearing wickedly and doing actual violence to his mother" in 1701. Other offences included the hanging out of laundry on the Lord's Day and many instances of infidelity. One of the penalties that could be applied was the Stool of Repentance where individuals could be publicly shamed. This was originally situated in a corner of the church building but in 1694, it was moved to below the pulpit to increase its prominence.

The church session was also assigned the duty of care for the poor, and in 1672, part of this duty was transferred to the heritors of the parish. These wealthy landowners made a list of the poor and shared them out amongst themselves. The care shown to the poor included the provision of accommodation and maintenance, and any failure of the better-off to provide these could have led to legal proceedings against them. In 1845, the relief of poverty was transferred to the Parochial Board, although the kirk continued to provide assistance on a case-by-case basis.

Until 1872, the provision of education had been the responsibility of the kirk session, but this was transferred to a School Board (from 1873 to 1919) for building and running schools in the area. The former Temple Primary School (1901–2007) now in Glasgow, is an example (see photo). In 1895, the Parochial Board became the Parish Council, which had responsibility for town planning and housing, lighting, drainage. In 1930, the word "parish" was dropped, and New Kilpatrick became a District Council.

The boundaries of the civil parish were modified by the formation of Milngavie Burgh in 1875, the Local Government (Scotland) Act 1889 and the Local Government (Scotland) Act 1929. The district council was dissolved in 1958 on creation of Bearsden Burgh, which was itself dissolved in 1975. Control then passed to Bearsden and Milngavie district within Strathclyde Regional Council until 1996. The local government of the original parish area is now administered by East Dunbartonshire, Glasgow and Stirlingshire Councils.

== Economy and geography ==
In 1672, the Scottish Parliament heard a petition from John Douglas of Mains to hold markets in the parish on 1 May and 21 October each year. The purpose of this was to encourage the local economy, and the bill was passed. John Douglas was a heritor of the parish and was the 11th Laird of Mains, registering his coat of arms in 1672.

The geology of the area runs east–west through the parish from Dunbarton to Maryhill and has supported various industries. Devonian Old Red Sandstone (415–360 million years old) is overlaid by the Carboniferous Limestone series (360–300 million years old); in particular, the Hurlet Limestone and Hurlet Coal of the lower limestone group are prominently developed. A yellow sandstone of quite different character from the Old Red Sandstone extends from the Clyde at intervals to Netherton and Garscube. This stone easily chiselled, but hardens on exposure, making it a useful building material. Local industry has historically included some coal-mining and lime manufacture, and an iron works at Garscube. Coal was mined at Baljaffray until 1910 and used for burning limestone (also found there) to make lime. However, the presence of significant pyrite deposits in the coal made it poor quality and unsuitable for further exploitation.

By 1911, the Encyclopædia Britannica described New Kilpatrick as a town in Dumbartonshire, 5.5 miles (9 km) N.W. of Glasgow, with a railway station on the Milngavie branch line. Key public buildings are listed as the Schaw Convalescent Home, Buchanan Retreat (now Boclair House), house of refuge for girls, a library, and St Peter's College.

== Current church and related parish ==
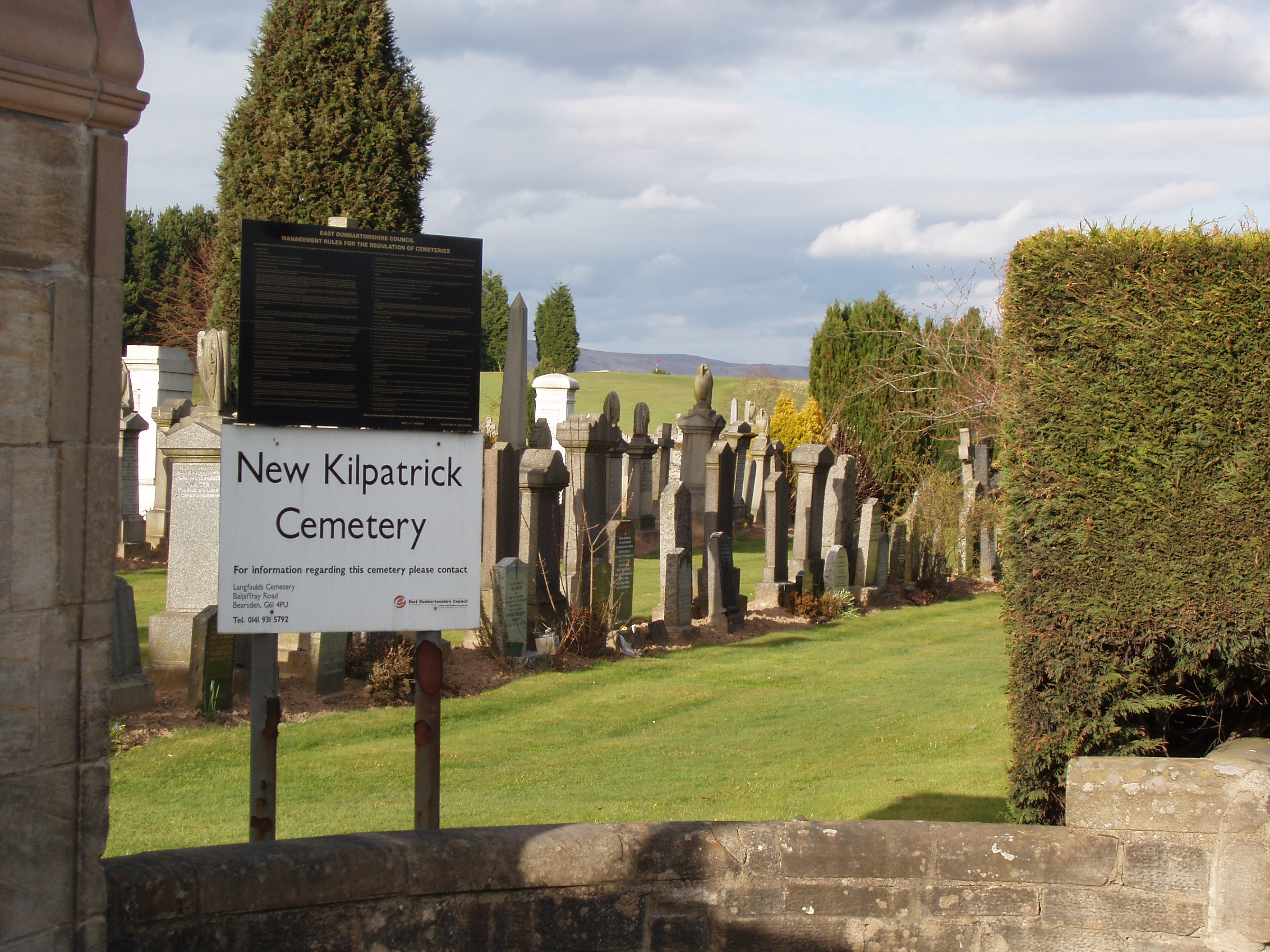
New Kilpatrick Cemetery, Bearsden

The original parish church was built in 1649 from local stone. This can be confirmed by the passing of an Act of the Scottish Parliament (in July 1649) in favour of the parishioners of New Kilpatrick and against one of the parish heritors, Sir Umphra Colquhoun of Balvie (now Mains). It seems that Colquhoun had agreed to the quarrying of stone from his land to build the church, but at some point during the building process (at least halfway), he had confiscated the workmen's tools and prevented the work from continuing by charging the workers with lawburrows. For this to be the case, Colquhoun must have argued that the work in some way caused him to fear for his safety, and the workers would have had to place a deposit with the court, which would be forfeited if they continued. Colquhoun lost the petition, and the church was completed. The current New Kilpatrick Church was built in 1807, and subsequently enlarged in 1873–85 and in 1908. Electric lights were installed in 1923. The church for many years placed assistant ministers within the parish at Netherton and Temple, Blairdardie, Drumchapel and Westerton. The church is also one of the principal performing venues of the Bearsden Choir.

In 1929, further housing developments and the union of churches in Scotland brought together the growing congregations of Beardsen North (Free Church) and South (United Presbyterian) churches into the Church of Scotland in Bearsden. It was therefore deemed appropriate to divide the remaining parish area, leaving the original New Kilpatrick church with oversight of an area with boundaries at Canniesburn, Burnbrae and the Baljaffray-Stockiemuir crossroads.

== Maps of the area ==
William Roy's Military Survey of the Scottish Lowlands 1747–1755 does not show the parish boundary, but does depict "New Kirk of Killpatrick" at the site of the church.

John Thomson's Atlas of Scotland (1832) shows the parish boundary. Milngavie, Summerston and Kessington are shown in the county of Stirlingshire, with the remainder of the parish in Dunbartonshire.

The Ordnance Survey One Inch Second Edition Sheet 30 (revised 1895) also shows the parish boundary. Neighbouring parishes (clockwise from North) are Killearn, Strathblane, Baldernock, Cadder, Barony, Govan, Renfrew and Old Kilpatrick.
