= Paul Lustig Dunkel =

American flutist and conductor

Paul Lustig Dunkel (July 22, 1943 – January 14, 2018) was an American flutist and conductor. From 1983 to 2008, he served as music director of the Westchester Philharmonic. He also taught at the New England Conservatory, the Eastman School of Music, Queens College, City University of New York, Vassar College, the University of Connecticut and State University of New York at Purchase.

== Biography ==
Dunkel was born in New York City, where he spent his early years. His mother, Johanna Lustig, was a pianist from Vienna, Austria and his father, Eugene Borisovich Dunkel, was a scenic designer, born in Russia.

Dunkel began studying the piano at the age of eight, and with the encouragement of Marianne Kuranda, his piano teacher, began studying the flute two years later. He studied flute with Robert DiDomenica and William Kincaid, and piano with Lothar Epstein and Anka Bernstein-Landau. He attended The High School of Music & Art in New York City. He grew up on the upper West Side of Manhattan, where, prior to attending Music & Art, he attended Franklin School, where he was renowned for his skill at playing baseball.

In 1966, Dunkel took the silver medal at the Birmingham International Woodwind Festival (UK). (James Galway took the gold.) In 1978, he co-founded and picked the players for Dennis Russell Davies's American Composers Orchestra. He acted as both manager and principal flute, later a resident conductor.

As music director of the Westchester Philharmonic, Dunkel developed a reputation for presenting new works and promoting new artists. In honor of his 15th year with the orchestra, a composition by Melinda Wagner was commissioned. Concerto for Flute, Strings, and Percussion was subsequently awarded a Pulitzer Prize in 1999.

Dunkel and the orchestra were the recipients of the 2000 Leonard Bernstein Award for Educational Programming from the American Society of Composers, Authors and Publishers (ASCAP) and the American Symphony Orchestra League for excellence and innovation in music education. Dunkel concluded his Westchester Philharmonic tenure after the 2007–2008 season.

Dunkel died on January 14, 2018, aged 74.
