= Westchester Philharmonic =

American symphony orchestra

The Westchester Philharmonic is a professional symphony orchestra based in Westchester County, New York, United States. The orchestra performs in the concert hall of the Performing Arts Center at Purchase College.

The orchestra was founded in 1983 by a group of music lovers, led by flutist Paul Lustig Dunkel, who served for 25 years as the orchestra's music director and conductor. The orchestra originally was known as the New Orchestra of Westchester. In the early 1990s, the name Westchester Philharmonic was adopted.

The orchestra has developed a reputation for presenting new compositions and upcoming artists. A piece commissioned by the philharmonic from composer Melinda Wagner, Concerto for Flute, Strings, and Percussion, was awarded a Pulitzer Prize in 1999. The orchestra was also among the first to present violinist Midori Goto in concert.

In 2006, Dunkel announced he would retire as music director and conductor after the philharmonic's 25th-anniversary season. In November 2007, the orchestra announced the appointment of Itzhak Perlman as artistic director and principal conductor. Perlman debuted as the orchestra's conductor on October 11, 2008, in an all-Beethoven program: the Emperor Concerto with pianist Leon Fleisher and Symphony No. 7. Since 2006, the orchestra has been led by Executive Director Joshua Worby. In 2011 the philharmonic underwent an organizational reshuffle; Perlman left his positions as conductor and artistic director, Worby assumed the position of artistic director in addition to executive director, and renowned violinist Jaime Laredo and award-winning Broadway conductor Ted Sperling were hired to co-conduct.
