= Concerto for Flute, Strings, and Percussion =

Flute concerto composed by Melinda Wagner

Concerto for Flute, Strings and Percussion is a 1998 musical composition by Melinda Wagner, who was awarded the 1999 Pulitzer Prize for Music for the work. A concerto for flute and orchestra, it was commissioned by the Westchester Philharmonic Orchestra, who premiered it May 30, 1998, for flutist and conductor Paul Lustig Dunkel. The Pulitzer Prize Music Jury found the work notable for the piece's flute solo and integration of the orchestral accompaniment. Wagner's victory was a unanimous decision by the jury.

Containing strings, percussion, keyboards, celeste, and harp while omitting brass and woodwinds, the ensemble is similar to that of Bartók's Music for Strings, Percussion and Celesta. The piece contains three movements: sonata-allegro, lullaby, and rondo.

A piano reduction of the work, published by Theodore Presser Company, was created by Scottish-American composer, Jennifer Margaret Barker.
