= Danny Rozin =

Israeli-American artist

Daniel Rozin
- Born: 1961 (age 64–65); Jerusalem, Israel
- Occupations: Associate Arts Professor, ITP, NYU
- Known for: Digital, Interactive art
- Website: smoothware.com

Daniel Rozin (born in 1961) is an Israeli-American artist working in the area of interactive digital art. As an interactive artist Rozin creates installations and sculptures that have the unique ability to change and respond to the presence and point of view of the viewer. In many cases the viewer becomes the contents of the piece and in others the viewer is invited to take an active role in the creation of the piece.

== Biography ==
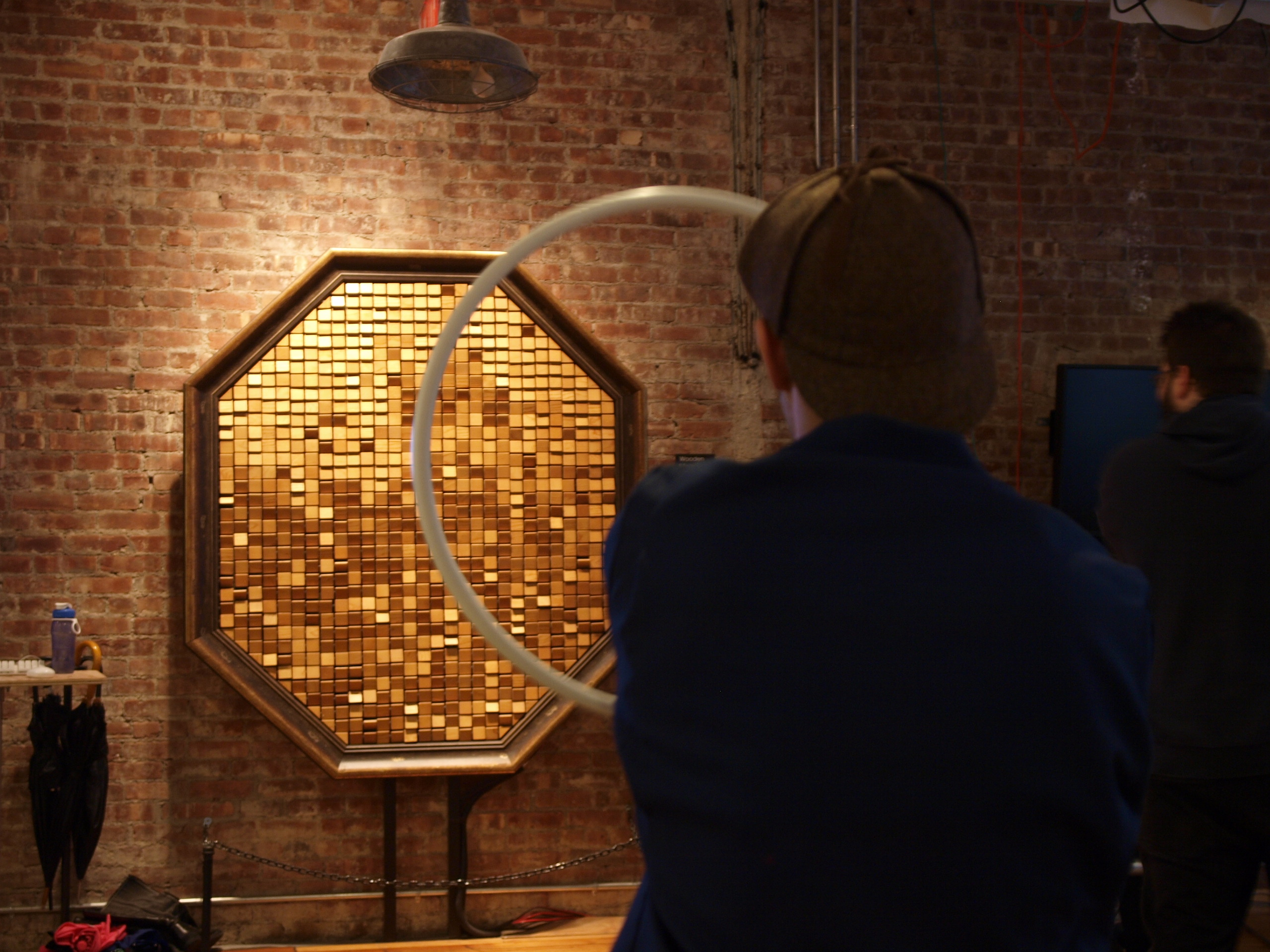
"The Wooden Mirror"

Rozin was born in Jerusalem in 1961. He studied industrial design at the Bezalel Academy in Jerusalem. Rozin lives and works in New York City.

== Rust Mirror ==
"Rust Mirror" is the eighth piece in a series of works that Rozin has created since 1999 called ‘mechanical mirrors’. In this series Rozin creates large-scale displays that recreate the viewer’s reflection by means of the manipulation of a multitude of tiles in a variety of materials, in effect turning these into physical pixels. Rust Mirror creates the viewer’s image by tilting tiles of rusted steel up and down in relation to a light source above the piece. As a person interacts with the piece, a trickle of ‘rain’ starts to flow onto the piece in the form of sequences of moving tiles. The more the person interacts with the piece the more it rains, until finally the storm of rain droplets completely overcomes the image of the viewer, accompanied by a loud rumble of rain produced by the motors and tiles. When the viewer steps out, the piece gradually settles down and returns to a still state. Rusted steel is one of the least reflective of materials, and also a material that suggests outdoor dilapidation rather than precise digital accuracy and control. The piece is presented on a bed of gravel that produces a crunching sound as the viewer interacts with the piece and emphasizes the outdoor/architectural style that the piece implies. To interact with the piece, stand in front of it at a distance of a few meters, see yourself reflected on its surface, note that the more you move in front of the piece the more it ‘rains’, move closer to the piece to get a more ‘zoomed-in’ image of your reflection.

== Awards ==
"Trash Mirror No. 3"

His work has earned him numerous awards including:

- Honorary Mentions, Prix Ars Electronica
- ID Design Review
- Chrysler Design Award

== Solo exhibitions ==
- 2018 "MIRROR MIRROR" - Arts Brookfield NY
- 2015 "South Dakota" - Angostura Dam (U.S.)
- 2013 "Angles" - Bitforms gallery NY
- 2012 "Mirrors" - Universidad Veritas San Jose, Costa Rica
- 2011 "Daniel Rozin" - Museum of the Moving Image NY
- 2010 "Contrast" - Chrysler Museum Norfolk VA
- 2010 X by Y - Bitforms gallery NY
- 2009 "Reflections" - Exploratorium SF
- 2007 "Fabrication" - Bitforms gallery NY
- 2006 "Daniel Rozin" - Bitforms gallery, Seoul Korea
- 2005 “New Work” at Bitforms gallery NY
- 2004 “Mirror image” - John Michael Kohler Art Center WI
- 2003 “Mirrors” - Liquid Space, Israel Museum, Jerusalem
- 2002 “Mirrors” - Bitforms gallery NY

== Group exhibitions ==
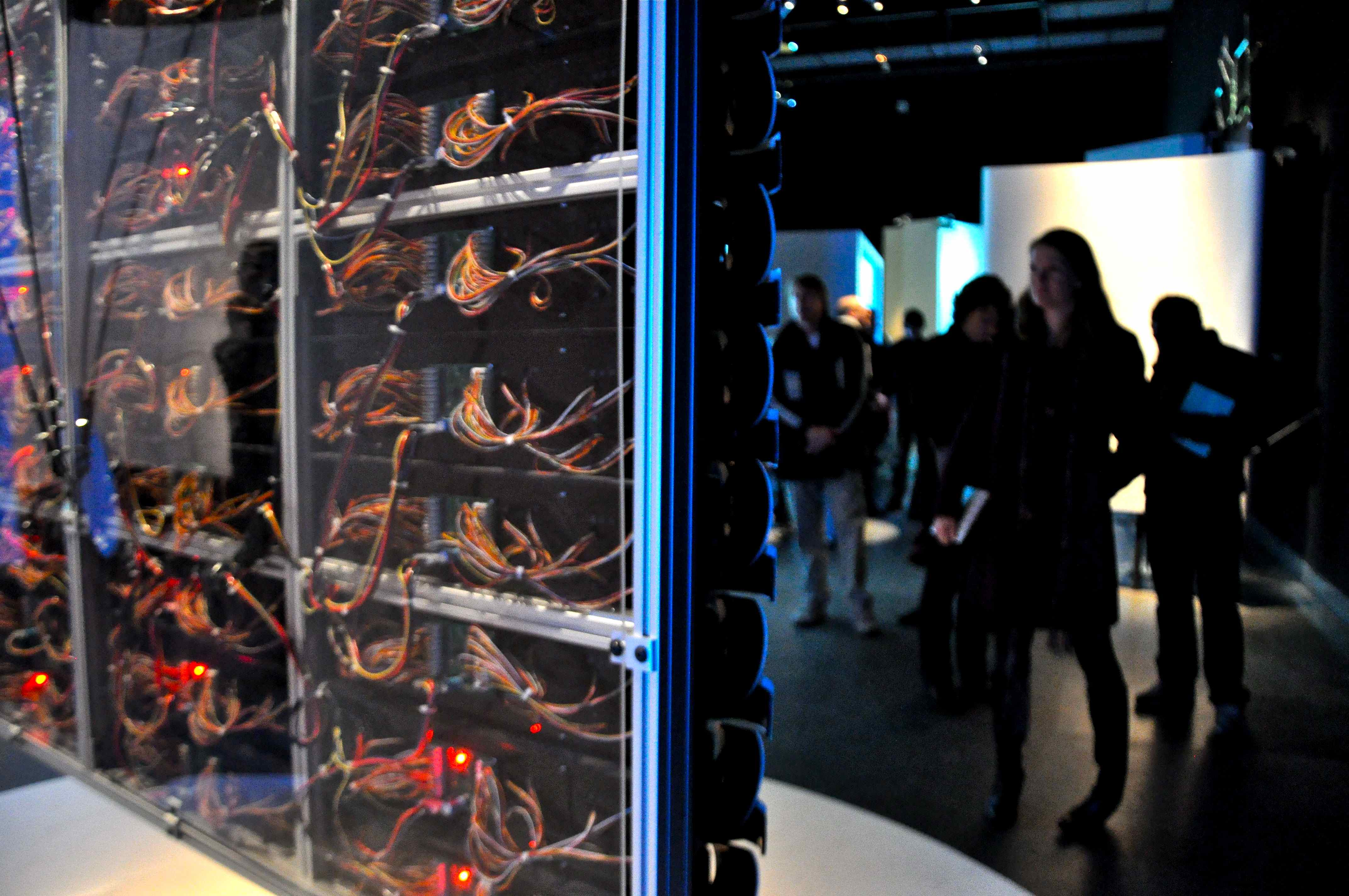
The back side of "Weave Mirror"

- Ars Electronica 2017, Berlin
- 2012 I/O/I. The senses of machines (Interaction Laboratory) Disseny Hub Barcelona
- 2010 ARCO Madrid Feb.
- 2010 ArchiTECHtonica, CU Art Museum Bouder CO Sep 9 - Dec 18
- 2010 TV of Tomorrow show, Yerba Buena, SF March
- 2010 What We See, Peabody Essex Museum, Salem, MA
- 2009 Victoria and Albert Museum London - Decode, Dec1 -Apr 11
- 2009 5MinutesMuseum, Dutch Design Week Eindhoven NL Oct 17 - 25
- 2009 Beyond Appearances Lehman Gallery New York Sep10 - Dec 1
- 2009 Dvorak Sec Contemporary, Prague
- 2009 Papalote Museo del Nino, Mexico City
- 2009 Pulse New York, March 5–9
- 2009 Taubman Museum inaugural show, Roanoke VA- November 8- February 9
- 2009 "Act/React" Milwaukee Art Museum - October 8 - January 9
- 2008 "Souls and Machines" Reina Sofia Museum Madrid - June
- 2008 "Sundance Film Festival at BAM" -June
- 2008 "Displacement" at CPR Brooklyn NY -March
- 2008 "New Frontier On Main", Sundance festival - January
- 2007 "Chapter 2 " Think 21 gallery Brussels, Belgium - December
- 2007 Pulse Contemporary Art Fair Miami - December
- 2007 "Make Art" Owens College OH
- 2006 TimeScan at Daelim Contemporary Art Museum Seoul
- 2006 Circles Mirror at Wired NextFest, New York
- 2006 Software Mirrors Itaú Cultural Institute, São Paulo, Brazil. Emoção Art.ficial 3.0
- 2006 Circles Mirror at ArtRock, France
- 2005 Wooden Mirror at MUSAC, Spain
- 2005 Trash Mirror at Taiwan National Museum of Fine Arts
- 2005 Live Pictures at Jamaica Center for Arts. NY
- 2005 ARCO Madrid Spain
- 2005 “Mosaics” exhibition at “Zman Laomanut” Tel Aviv Israel
- 2003 "Ars Electronica" - Trash Mirror . Linz Austria
- 2003 Group exhibition “Body Double” at Art Interactive Cambridge MA .
- 2002 American Museum of Moving Image - “Trash Mirror” in lobby.
- 2001 Inaugural exhibition, Markle Foundation Rockefeller Center New York
- 2000 "New Media New Face - New York" April 2000 ICC Tokyo Japan.
- 2000 "SIGGRAPH" July 2000 Siggraph art gallery New Orleans.
- 2000 "Media_City Seoul 2000" September 2000 Seoul, Korea.
- 2000 Tisch School of the Arts 35 Anniversary Gala December 2000 Lincoln Center
- 1999 "Interaction-99" March 1999 Ogaki City, Japan.
- 1999 "Ars Electronica" September 1999 Linz, Austria (Honorary mention).
- 1999 "More and Less" October 1999 ITP New York University New York.
- 1997 "Elsewhere" February 1997 SOHO Threadwaxing gallery, New York.

== Performance ==
- 2007-2008 "Mirrors" Eighth Blackbird ensemble, composer Tamar Muskal
