= Melinda Wagner =

American composer (born 1957)

- Born: Melinda Jane Wagner; 1957 (age 68–69)
- Origin: American
- Occupations: Composer

Melinda Jane Wagner (born 1957 in Philadelphia) is an American composer, and winner of the 1999 Pulitzer Prize in music. Her undergraduate degree is from Hamilton College. She received her graduates degrees from University of Chicago and University of Pennsylvania. She also served as Composer-in-Residence at the University of Texas (Austin) and at the 'Bravo!' Vail Valley Music Festival. Some of her teachers included Richard Wernick, George Crumb, Shulamit Ran, and Jay Reise.

== Career ==
A resident of Ridgewood, New Jersey, Wagner won the 1999 Pulitzer Prize for her Concerto for Flute, Strings and Percussion. The Chicago Symphony has commissioned three major works, Falling Angels (1992); a piano concerto, Extremity of Sky (2002) for Emanuel Ax; the most recent of these, Proceed, Moon (2016), was premiered by the orchestra under the baton of Susanna Mälkki in 2017. Extremity of Sky has also been performed by Emanuel Ax with the National Symphony, the Toronto Symphony, the Kansas City Symphony, and the Staatskapelle Berlin. Other works have been performed by a number of orchestras, including the New York New Music Ensemble, the Network for New Music, Orchestra 2001, the San Francisco Contemporary Music Players, and many other leading organizations.

She has received many honorable mentions, including a Guggenheim Memorial Foundation Fellowship and awards from the American Academy of Arts and Letters and three ASCAP Young Composer awards. Beforehand, she also received an honorary degree from Hamilton College. Some of her famous pieces are the Trombone Concerto (2007), Falling Angels (1992), and Extremity of Sky (2002).

Wagner was also commissioned by the New York Philharmonic (a concerto for principal trombonist Joseph Alessi), from the Chamber Music Society of Lincoln Center, the Barlow, Fromm, and Koussevitzky Foundations, the American Brass Quintet, and from guitarist David Starobin. She has received a Guggenheim Memorial Foundation Fellowship, an award from the American Academy of Arts and Letters, an honorary degree from Hamilton College, as well as a Distinguished Alumni Award from the University of Pennsylvania. Her other performances include the Dallas Symphony, the American Composers Orchestra, the Women's Philharmonic, the New York Pops, and the US Marine Band.

Wagner has held a faculty position at The Juilliard School since 2016. Previously, Wagner has held faculty positions at Brandeis University, Smith College, and Syracuse University. Wagner has also taught at many universities including the University of Pennsylvania, Swarthmore College, Syracuse University, and Hunter College. She has lectured at many schools such as Yale University, Cornell University, Juilliard School, and Mannes School of Music. Wagner has served as Composer-in-Residence at the University of Texas Austin and at the Bravo! Vail Valley Music Festival. She currently resides in New Jersey with her husband, percussionist James Saporito, and their children.

== Partial list of works ==
- Falling Angels (1992)
- Concerto for Flute, Strings, and Percussion (Pulitzer Prize winner - 1999)
- Extremity of Sky (piano concerto - 2002)
- Concerto for Trombone and Orchestra (2007)
- Arabesque for Solo Guitar
- Noggin: Four Pieces for Piano
- Tintinnabulum for Piano
- Brass Quintet No. 1
- Concertino for Harpsichord and String Quintet
- Four Settings for Soprano and Ensemble
- My Tioga for String Quartet
- Pan Journal for Harp and String Quartet
- Proceed, Moon for orchestra (2016)
- Romanze With Faux Variations Piano Trio No. 2
- Scritch for Oboe and String Quartet
- Sextet for Flute, Clarinet, Violin, Viola, Cello, Piano
- Seven Muses Contemporary Anthology for Flute and Piano
- Sleep Awake: Two Songs for Mezzo-soprano, Clarinet, and Piano
- Wick for Chamber Ensemble
- Wing and Prayer for Clarinet, violoncello, percussion, and piano
- Ancient Music SABTA Acapella
- From a Book of Early Prayers for SATB Acapella
- 57/7 Dash Overture for Timpani, Percussion, and orchestra
- Little Moonhead three tributaries to Bach
- Scamp for Wind Ensemble

== Awards ==
- 2003: Distinguished Alumni Award from the University of Pennsylvania
- 2001: Honorary degree from Hamilton College
- 2000: Award from the American Academy of Arts and Letters
- 1999: Pulitzer Prize in Music for Concerto for Flute, Strings, and Percussion
- 1991: MacDowell Colony Resident Fellowship
- 1988: Guggenheim Memorial Foundation Fellowship
- 1988: MacDowell Colony Resident
- 1986: MacDowell Colony Resident
- 1986: Yaddo Resident Fellowship
- 1984, 1985, 1987: ASCAP Young Composer Awards
