= Brian MacKinnon =

Scottish impostor (born 1963)

Brian Lachlan MacKinnon (born 3 June 1963) is a Scottish impostor who gained notoriety by returning to his former school by posing as a teenager when he was 30 years old.

== Early life ==
McKinnon was born in Glasgow to working-class parents; his father was a lollipop man and his mother worked at a care home. He originally attended Bearsden Academy from 1974 to 1980, then went on to study medicine at University of Glasgow. He left after failing exams due to an illness, after which he returned to Bearsden and found work as a janitor at a health club.

== Imposture ==
Using the name Brandon Lee, McKinnon reenrolled at Bearsden Academy as a fifth-year student in 1993, claiming to be a sixteen-year-old Canadian. He said that he had moved to Scotland to live with his grandmother after his mother, an opera singer, died in a car crash.

MacKinnon became popular with his classmates. He earned five As in his Higher Grade examinations and was accepted at the University of Dundee to study medicine.

McKinnon was exposed as an imposter by an anonymous phone call to education authorities and newspapers. He was expelled from the University of Dundee.

== Media ==
McKinnon is the author of two autobiographies: the first, entitled Margin Walker, he published on the internet in the late 90s; the second, entitled Rhesus Negative, was published by Austin Macauley Publishers in 2016.

In the late 90s, a film based on MacKinnon’s life was in development. It was to be entitled Younger Than Springtime, starring and directed by Alan Cumming, but it never materialised.

A documentary entitled My Old School, directed by MacKinnon’s former classmate Jono McLeod, was released in 2022. MacKinnon agreed to be interviewed for the documentary, but refused to appear on camera. Alan Cumming portrayed McKinnon, lip syncing his audio interview.

== Extortion ==
In November 2026, MacKinnon pled guilty to a charge of attempted extortion after breaking into the home of a former University of Glasgow professor in September 2025. He was remanded in custody and is expected to face a custodial sentence.
