= Westerton railway station =

Railway station in East Dunbartonshire, Scotland

Westerton Scottish Gaelic: Am Baile Siar
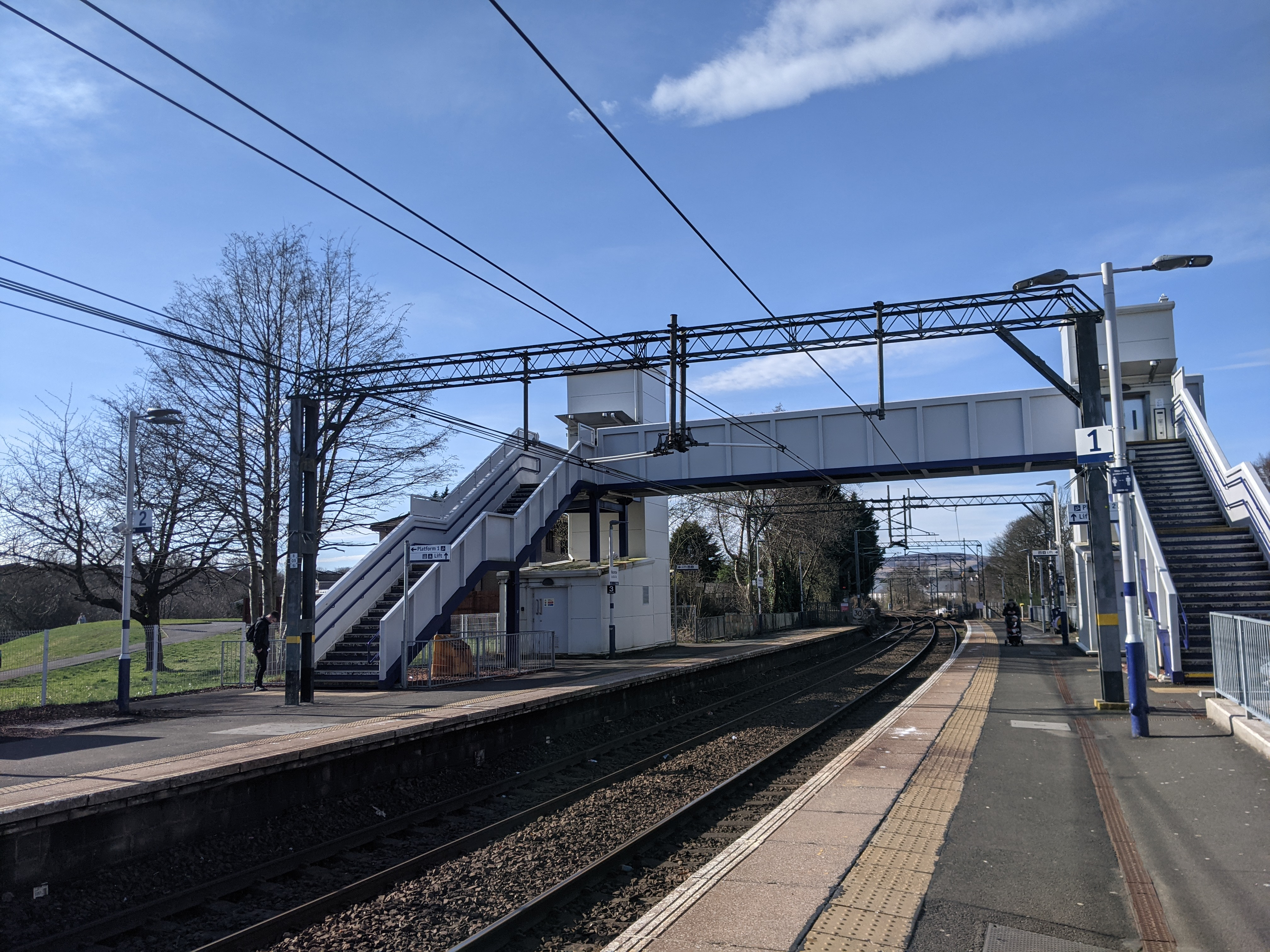
- The station platforms seen in 2021

General information
- Location: Bearsden, East Dunbartonshire; Scotland
- Coordinates: 55.9048°N 4.3351°W
- Grid reference: NS541704
- Manager: ScotRail
- Transit authority: SPT
- Platforms: 2

Other information
- Station code: WES

History
- Pre-grouping: North British Railway
- Post-grouping: LNER

Key dates
- 1 September 1913: Opened

Passengers
- 2021/22: ▲0.382 million
- Interchange: ▲14,546
- 2022/23: ▲0.513 million
- Interchange: ▲16,227
- 2023/24: ▲0.644 million
- Interchange: ▲21,642
- 2024/25: ▲0.675 million
- Interchange: ▲26,787
- 2025/26: ▲0.695 million
- Interchange: ▲27,787
Location
Notes
- Passenger statistics from the Office of Rail and Road

Westerton railway station is a railway station that serves the Westerton district in the town of Bearsden, Scotland. The station is managed and served by ScotRail as part of the Strathclyde Partnership for Transport network. It is located on the Argyle and North Clyde lines, between Drumchapel to the west, Bearsden to the north, and Anniesland and Maryhill to the south-east. It is 6 miles 10 chains (9.9 km) west of Glasgow Queen Street, measured via Maryhill.

The station lies very close to the Forth and Clyde Canal and the boundary between East Dunbartonshire and the city of Glasgow.

== History ==
The former footbridge seen in 2010

The station opened on 1 September 1913. The station has a cross platform bridge with lift access which began production in June 2017, and became operational in 2018.

Prior to 19 September 2014, Westerton was also served by the overnight Caledonian Sleeper service between Fort William and London Euston, to allow Glasgow-bound passengers to change onto a connecting service, as the sleeper used a route avoiding the city centre. From 21 September 2014 the sleeper service was re-routed to call instead at Queen Street Low Level and so the stop was removed from the timetable.

== Facilities ==
The station has a ticket office and ticket machine on platform 1, as well as an accessible toilet and waiting room. There is a shelter on platform 2, and benches and help points on both platforms. The car park and bike racks are adjacent to platform 1.

== Passenger volume ==
Passenger Volume at Westerton
	2002–03	2004–05	2005–06	2006–07	2007–08	2008–09	2009–10	2010–11	2011–12	2012–13	2013–14	2014–15	2015–16	2016–17	2017–18	2018–19	2019–20	2020–21
Entries and exits	461,235	533,662	597,777	615,382	633,364	689,592	658,378	683,484	735,430	775,164	747,582	784,490	794,600	794,094	783,084	790,626	774,774	102,858
Interchanges	N/A	21,488	24,657	30,727	29,838	35,630	34,678	38,571	35,525	36,047	31,713	35,482	38,330	31,114	28,890	28,449	26,884	1,780

The statistics cover twelve-month periods that start in April.

== Services ==
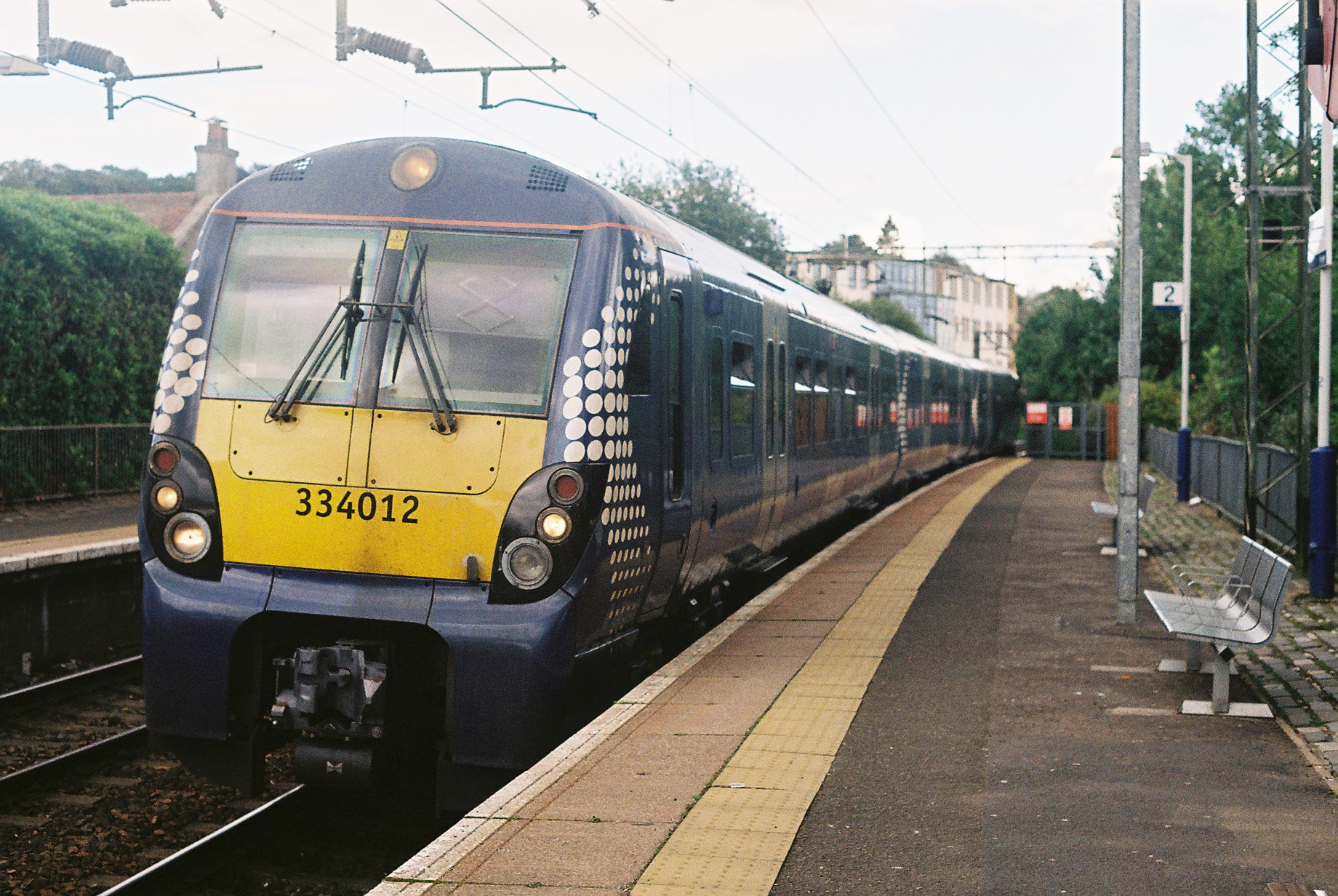
A Class 334 at Westerton station

On weekdays and Saturdays, there are two trains per hour to Milngavie, two trains to Balloch and two trains to Dalmuir, the latter two calling at all stations via Singer. Heading south-east, there are two trains per hour to Airdrie, two to Springburn and two to Larkhall, via Hamilton Central. In the weekday evenings, there are an extra two trains per hour between Helensburgh Central and Edinburgh, the Springburn trains instead run to Motherwell via Whifflet, and the Dalmuir and Larkall trains do not run. On Sundays, there are two trains per hour north and west to each of Milngavie and Helensburgh, and there are two trains per hour south-east to each of Edinburgh and Motherwell (via Hamilton Central).

Preceding station	National Rail	Following station
Anniesland	ScotRail; Argyle Line	Drumchapel
Anniesland	ScotRail; Argyle Line	Bearsden
Anniesland	ScotRail; North Clyde Line	Drumchapel
Anniesland	ScotRail; North Clyde Line	Bearsden

== Bibliography ==
- Brailsford, Martyn, ed. (December 2017) [1987]. Railway Track Diagrams 1: Scotland & Isle of Man (6th ed.). Frome: Trackmaps. ISBN 978-0-9549866-9-8.
- Butt, R. V. J. (October 1995). The Directory of Railway Stations: details every public and private passenger station, halt, platform and stopping place, past and present (1st ed.). Sparkford: Patrick Stephens Ltd. ISBN 978-1-85260-508-7. OCLC 60251199. OL 11956311M.
- Jowett, Alan (March 1989). Jowett's Railway Atlas of Great Britain and Ireland: From Pre-Grouping to the Present Day (1st ed.). Sparkford: Patrick Stephens Ltd. ISBN 978-1-85260-086-0. OCLC 22311137.
