= My Old School (2022 film) =

2022 documentary film

- Promotional poster
- Directed by: Jono McLeod
- Produced by: John Archer; Olivia Lichtenstein
- Starring: Alan Cumming; Clare Grogan; Lulu
- Cinematography: George Geddes
- Edited by: Berny McGurk
- Music by: Shelly Poole
- Production companies: Creative Scotland; Hopscotch Films
- Distributed by: Dogwoof (United Kingdom); Magnolia Pictures (United States)
- Release dates: 24 January 2022 (Sundance); 22 July 2022 (United States)
- Running time: 115 minutes
- Countries: United Kingdom; United States
- Language: English
- Box office: $279,743

My Old School is a 2022 documentary directed by Jono McLeod on the subject of the Brandon Lee scandal. In 1995, it was discovered that "Brandon Lee"—who had a year earlier enrolled as a fifth-year student at Bearsden Academy secondary school in Bearsden, Scotland—had actually been a 32-year-old former student, Brian MacKinnon, posing as a 16-year-old. The story attracted widespread and sensational news coverage at the time.

McLeod, the film's director, was one of MacKinnon's peers at Bearsden Academy. The story of MacKinnon's time at Bearsden and his unmasking are told through a combination of present-day interviews with MacKinnon's classmates and teachers, cartoon recreations, and archival footage. MacKinnon agreed to be interviewed for the film, but did not wish to appear on camera, so the actor Alan Cumming appears as an avatar for MacKinnon, lip syncing to the audio of his interviews.

The film premiered virtually at the 2022 Sundance Film Festival.

== Plot ==
My Old School tells the story of MacKinnon's time at Bearsden and subsequent outing and media coverage in chronological order. His fellow pupils describe him as looking older than them and having a deeper voice. One expresses surprise that he has the same enrolment name as Bruce Lee's recently deceased son, Brandon. A former teacher says they understood he had been in a car crash and this was why his skin looked older. His strange accent was explained by his having lived in Canada. A black pupil describes experiencing racism and violence at school but 'Brandon' was friends with him and helped him with homework.

'Brandon' favoured 80s music but his 'peers' thought this was due to his interest in music history. In class he was incredibly knowledgeable - he doesn't try to play down what he knows to fit in. In the present MacKinnon says his IQ was described as being 158 when he was aged eight. We are not told why he is attending school as a 30 year old. MacKinnon's deception is not revealed until around halfway through the film, at the point in the story at which MacKinnon's peers discover it, effectively positioning the audience in their point of view. The film also withholds any contemporary photographs or footage of MacKinnon before this point.

McLeod interviewed some of MacKinnon's classmates and teachers, often in pairs, and they, along with MacKinnon himself, embodied by Alan Cumming, provide much of the film's narration. Interviews were conducted on sets designed to resemble the classrooms of Bearsden (the actual schoolhouse having been demolished years earlier).

The story is also told via cartoon recreations voiced by professional voice actors, including the Scottish actresses Clare Grogan and Lulu. The visual style of these cartoon sequences has been compared by a number of commentators to the animated sitcom Daria, which aired on MTV between 1997 and 2002. These cartoons sequences are scored with contemporary pop music.

There is a discussion of the school production of South Pacific, where he played Lieutenant Cable, ironically shown singing "Younger Than Springtime". He was a good singer with an appropriate accent which is why he was cast. He shared a kiss with his 16-year-old co-star. Several contributors describe his reluctance to kiss her in rehearsals and say it was like a 'peck' and another says 'no tongues!' The girl kissed, now an adult, demonstrates a close-lipped brief kiss and laughs about it. The musical is seen to be very successful and 'Brandon's' social cachet increases. He also drives a car.

Friends go to 'Brandon's' home and meet his grandmother. His mother (an opera singer) is already dead when a call comes to school to tell him that his father has now died. He gains sympathy. Later he takes his exams and gets A's and accepts a place at medical school. His teachers advise him to wait a year as he is still 'young' for university but he ignores them and goes to University of Dundee School of Medicine. However, he drops out and five friends come round to ask why. He says his gran has died so he is taking time out. Later, Jemma invites him on a group holiday with Cheryl and Nicola. 'Brandon' ends up in a fight and is arrested - the police find he has two passports. This is the official story of how MacKinnon was found out.

His former head teacher invites MacKinnon in and confronts him with the 1975 report card for Brian MacKinnon which also shows top grades. From here the story makes the six o'clock news. About half the teachers there had taught him in the 70s. The explanation for MacKinnon's deception was that, at that time, a person could not study medicine over the age of thirty, so he had returned to school to get into medical school again. He had been expelled after his first acceptance after becoming ill and failing his first year exams, he says.

It is then revealed that his 'grandmother' was alive but was actually his mother. It is also revealed that the fight on holiday, the police, and the two passports were a rumour not what happened. Apparently, he told the girls he was 32 and asked them to keep it a secret. Nicola says the holiday continued but it seemed bizarre that he had wanted to go on holiday with them. She thinks she gets his real life story - and what happened in the 70s during his first time at school.

Near the end video footage of the school play is shown. None of the participants have seen it before. They note that 'Brandon's' singing is poor. The kiss is shown and it lasts several seconds and then has a second kiss. All the participants are shocked and the girl who was kissed (now an adult) is visibly uncomfortable.

Another question raised is whether MacKinnon's gran/mum knew what was going on. Initially, former pupils think no, as for the two to conspire seemed sinister. However, they acknowledge that she had allowed herself to be called gran, and a teacher also realises that she had called the school as his gran to say 'Brandon's' father had died. (This was to get him out of a Physics test). So, she knew.

The film concludes by saying that MacKinnon continues to apply for a place at medical school and cuts a sad figure in town. The former pupils are shown in their real-life adult jobs, or with their children, looking happy and engaged with the future rather than the past. It is suggested that MacKinnon may have decided to try again and may have undergone cosmetic surgery to alter his appearance.

== Release ==
Before its premiere, My Old School was picked up for worldwide release by Dogwoof, a British film distributor specializing in documentaries. It premiered virtually in January at the 2022 Sundance Film Festival. It was subsequently screened at a number of other 2022 film festivals, including the Dublin International Film Festival, the Glasgow Film Festival, the Belgian film festival Docville, and Toronto's Hot Docs documentary film festival.

It was picked up by distributor Magnolia Pictures for a 22 July North American release.

== Reception ==
=== Critical response ===
On the review aggregator website Rotten Tomatoes, 92% of 98 critics' reviews are positive. The website's consensus reads: "My Old School's unique approach to an outlandish true story makes for entertaining -- and ultimately rather thought-provoking -- viewing." On Metacritic, the film has a weighted average score of 67 out of 100 based on 25 critics, which the site labels as "generally favorable" reviews.
