= Old Drumchapel =

Coordinates: 55°54′08″N 4°22′08″W

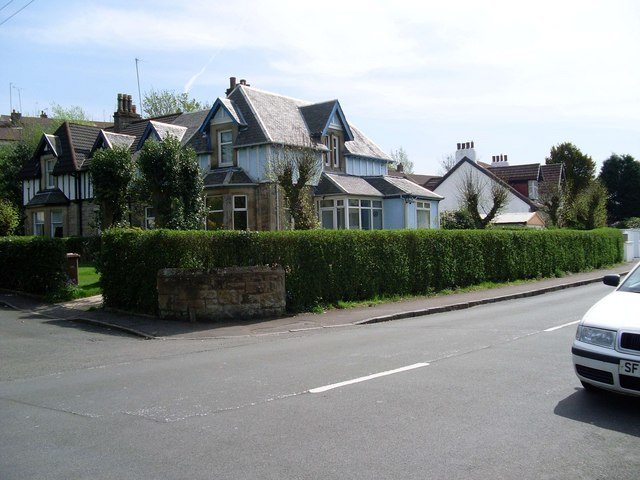
- Houses On Garscadden Road

- Location within Glasgow
- OS grid reference: NS519702
- Council area: Glasgow City Council
- Lieutenancy area: Glasgow
- Country: Scotland
- Sovereign state: United Kingdom
- Post town: GLASGOW
- Postcode district: G15 6
- Dialling code: 0141
- Police: Scotland
- Fire: Scottish
- Ambulance: Scottish
- UK Parliament: Glasgow North West
- Scottish Parliament: Glasgow Anniesland

Old Drumchapel is a neighbourhood of Glasgow, Scotland. It is located around Drumchapel railway station and formed part of the Cowdenhill and Garscadden Estates. It is situated to the south of the larger and newer Drumchapel housing estate, and to the north of the arterial Great Western Road running from Glasgow to Clydebank. The Blairdardie neighbourhood lies immediately to the east, while a retail park separates Old Drumchapel from the Linnvale and Drumry areas of Clydebank to the west.

== History ==
In the mid 19th century, Drumchapel was part of New Kilpatrick and consisted of Drumchapel West farm (on the site of Drumchapel St Andrew's Church) and Drumchapel East Farm (at the junction of Glenkirk Drive and Drumchapel Road). Garscadden Estate owned much of the land, however the much smaller Cowdenhill Estate owned most of the land Old Drumchapel was built on.

In the late 19th century two small coal mines were sunk, one between the stone villas in the present Drumchapel Gardens which was shut in 1879 and the other to the west of the path from Essenside Ave to the railway. When this closed in May 1891 the owners of the Cowdenhill and Garscadden Estates encouraged builders to erect large semi-detached stone villas. The first five villas were erected overlooking Garscadden Business Park. In 1891 they cost £1,200 each. Other villas were built around Drumchapel railway station which opened on 1 May 1890.

Drumchapel Lawn Tennis Club opened in August 1904 and Drumchapel Golf Course was opened in 1905. Harry Vardon played an exhibition 36 hole match on it in June 1909 against J.H.Taylor. The golf course was dug up in March 1917 to provide land for food production, and the club house was converted into two private semi-detached villas in Garscadden Road. The tennis club still exists, with floodlights and all weather courts. These two amenities were built to encourage housebuilders to the area. Plans to build houses on the hill overlooking Drumchapel Road were drawn up in 1898 but due to a downturn in housing were never built.

The original Blairdardie School open in 1780 at Lock 35 on the canal. Bursting at the seams with kids, it moved to Garscadden Road and the new village school opened there in 1905 and was converted into flats in 2005. John Lawrence built bungalows in the 1920s and in the 1930s semi-detached villas. The bungalows cost £650, or 21 shillings a week over a period of 25 years. Further houses were built next to the Post Office in the 1930s, which cost around £500. The Post Office was opened by Mr Goldie in 1901. A nursery run by a Mrs Mackenzie was situated opposite the Post Office which grew tomatoes (Ailsa Craig) for the Glasgow Fruit Market. In the post war period the nursery was run by the Rose family; the nursery business was gradually run down with the Rose's home and the nursery making way for shops and a filling station. Later developments included Olivers Function Suite and St Benedicts Church etc.

The former miners' row in Drumchapel Road near Drumchapel Hospital (built in 1904 as an extension of Royal Hospital for Sick Children) was demolished in September 1939 and the inhabitants re-housed by ballot in Dalsetter Place on the Thursday before World War Two was declared. Other industries included a brick works run by P & M Hurll on the Edrington Holdings site. Garscadden Brick and Tile Works (run by Robert & William Horn of Yoker - died 1875 and 1896 respectively - and latterly run as Blairdardie Brick & Tile Works by the Stevensons at Lock 35 on the Forth and Clyde Canal) closed in 1916. A third brick works run by Gilmours was located adjacent to Essenside Drive, but closed in 1904 due to shortage of brick making clay.

The post office in Garscadden Road closed on Friday 22 February 2008 as part of the Post Office network reorganisation plan. In 1959 the 204th Scouts were founded; based in their Scout Hall in Golf Drive, they are now the only Scout Group within the Drumchapel area.
