= Bearsden Academy =

Secondary school in East Dunbartonshire, Scotland

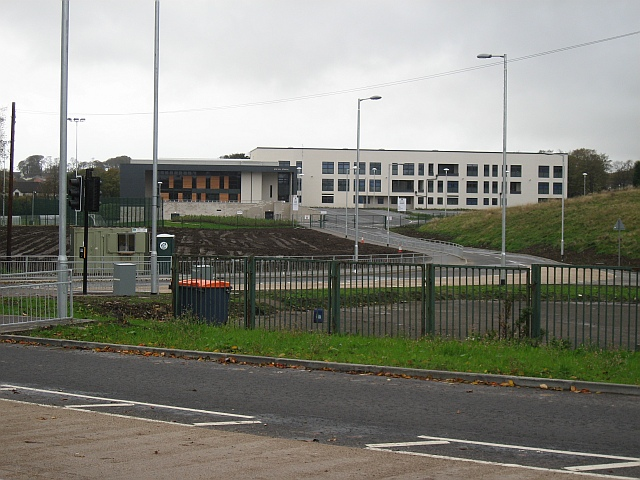
- Bearsden Academy building in 2009

Location
- Stockiemuir Road; Bearsden, East Dunbartonshire, G61 3SU; Scotland; 55.9274°N 4.3476°W

Information
- Type: State secondary school
- Motto: Committed to excellence
- Established: 1911; 115 years ago
- Local authority: East Dunbartonshire
- Chair of Parent Council: Iain Pringle
- Head teacher: George Cooper
- Staff: c. 100
- Gender: Co-educational
- Age: 11 to 18
- Enrollment: c. 1188
- Colours: Navy, red, gold, green
- Accreditation: Investors in People
- Publication: The BAnner
- Website: www.bearsdenacademy.e-dunbarton.sch.uk

Bearsden Academy is a non-denominational, state secondary school in Bearsden, East Dunbartonshire, Scotland.

== History ==
=== Bearsden Cross site (1911–1958) ===
In 1911, the school was situated on the corner of Roman Road and Drymen Road north of Bearsden railway station in the Bearsden Cross area of the town. It was originally known as New Kilpatrick Higher Grade School. It comprised both a primary school and a secondary school. The building was designed by the architectural firm James M. Monro & Sons. It opened on 17 August 1911. The first headmaster was Hugh Primrose. In 1920, the school was renamed Bearsden Academy. In 1958, with the town expanding, and becoming a burgh, a new secondary school was built on Morven Road and Bearsden Academy was moved there and the whole of the remaining building became Bearsden Primary School.

=== Morven Road site (1958–2010) ===
From 1958 to 2010 the school was located on the south side of Morven Road in Bearsden. The old Morven Road site was redeveloped as a new housing estate, comprising detached and flatted dwellings known as Academy Grove in 2009–12. Norman McLeod was a rector at the school and one of the streets in Academy Grove is named in his honour.

=== Stockiemuir Road site (2010–) ===
==== St Peter's College ====
The Stockiemuir Road site the academy occupies was originally a Roman Catholic seminary for the Archdiocese of Glasgow and then a teaching college. In 1874, the Archbishop of Glasgow, Charles Eyre originally established St Peter's College in Partickhill. In 1892, he decided to move it to Bearsden. The college chapel was the first to serve the local Catholic population.

With the arrival of a railway to the area, the population increased and the college chapel was expanded. In 1946, a fire destroyed the college, razing it to the ground. The decision was made by the archdiocese to abandon the site and build a new seminary in Cardross. The seminary was moved to Darleith House in Cardross and then Kilmahew House, before the new purpose-built St Peter's Seminary in Cardross was ready in 1966.

==== Teaching College ====
In 1966, to replace the seminary, a teaching college was built on the site. It was designed by the same architects as St Peter's Seminary, Cardross, the firm of Gillespie, Kidd & Coia (GKC). It was built in a U-shape, with two teaching blocks, a physical education building and five student accommodation buildings. In 1969, the complex was opened, as the Notre Dame College of Education.

In 1981, it merged with Craiglockhart College and was renamed St Andrew's College of Education. On 4 March 1998, it was registered as a category A listed building. In 1999, it joined with University of Glasgow to become the Faculty of Education of the University of Glasgow. In 2002, the teaching college was relocated and the site was declared surplus to university requirements. After negotiations between Historic Scotland and East Dunbartonshire Council, it was decided to demolish the site and build a school.

The new building was built under a public-private partnership. In August 2010 the new site for Bearsden Academy opened to staff and students.

== Controversies ==
=== 32-year-old pupil ===
In September 1995, it was discovered that Brian MacKinnon, a 32-year-old former student, had attended the academy for a year on the pretext of being a Canadian teenager named Brandon Lee. He had shaved his eyebrows to look younger and permed his hair. He starred in a school production of South Pacific and gained six highers (including five A grades, taking English, Maths, Chemistry, Physics and Biology), before going on to study medicine at Dundee University. Teachers had remarked on his mature appearance.

A 2022 documentary film about the events, My Old School, was made by one of Mackinnon's fellow pupils. It contains interviews with students and staff from the time; Alan Cumming plays the adult MacKinnon, lip syncing to the audio of MacKinnon's interviews.

=== Sex offending teacher ===
In November 2011, a married father of two was sentenced to a year and two months in jail for sexual offences relating to two pupils at Bearsden Academy. The 39-year-old teacher of mathematics, Muir McCormick, admitted a total of four sex charges involving the girls, aged 16 and 17. He had been suspended when the allegations first emerged, and later resigned.

=== Allegation ===
In 2005, East Dunbartonshire Council launched an inquiry into an allegation that a teacher had an affair with an ex-pupil. The teacher, who was not named, was sent home from the school after the 17-year-old girl's father made an official complaint, though not suspended.

== School roll ==
School year	Total roll	S1	S2	S3	S4	S5	S6	References
2000/2001	1373							
2001/2002	1375							
2002/2003								
2003/2004								
2004/2005	1303							
2005/2006								
2006/2007	1201	207	206	206	232	198	152	
2007/2008	1186	209	206	208	199	218	146	
2008/2009	1183	199	208	206	209	187	174	
2009/2010	1185	208	207	212	209	207	142	
2010/2011	1211							
2011/2012								
2012/2013	1188							

== Notable alumni ==
- Edwyn Collins of Orange Juice
- Katherine Grainger, Olympic Gold medallist rower
- Ross Greer MSP, Scottish Green Party MSP for West Scotland
- Alex Kapranos of Franz Ferdinand
- Aasmah Mir, journalist and broadcaster
- David Moyes, former manager of Manchester United
