= Archie Roy =

Scottish astronomer

- Archie Edmiston Roy; Machrie Moor 1982
- Born: 24 June 1924; Yoker, Glasgow, Scotland
- Died: 27 December 2012 (aged 88); Drumchapel Hospital, Glasgow, Scotland
- Education: Hillhead High School; University of Glasgow
- Known for: The Mirror Theorem in Celestial Mechanics
- Awards: Myers Memorial Medal (SPR)
- Scientific career
- Fields: Astronomy
- Workplaces: Shawlands Academy; University of Glasgow
- Doctoral advisor: Prof W M Smart

Archie Edmiston Roy FRSE, FRAS (24 June 1924 – 27 December 2012) was Professor Emeritus of Astronomy in the University of Glasgow.

== Career ==
Professor Archie Edmiston Roy, was educated at Hillhead High School and the University of Glasgow. He was married to Frances with three sons; Dr. Archie W N Roy, Ian Roy and Dr. David Roy; and two grandchildren David and Fraser.

Professor Roy was a Fellow of the Royal Society of Edinburgh, the Royal Astronomical Society, and the British Interplanetary Society. He was also a Member and past President of the Society for Psychical Research and Founding President of The Scottish Society for Psychical Research.

He was also elected a member of the European Academy of Arts, Sciences and the Humanities. He was a Patron of the Churches Fellowship (Scotland) for Psychical and Spiritual Studies and a member of the Scientific and Medical Network. Archie Roy conducted research in astrodynamics, celestial mechanics, archaeoastronomy, psychical research, and neural networks.

In addition Roy has published 20 books, six of them novels, some 70 scientific papers and scores of articles. His books have been published in the United Kingdom, United States, France, Russia, Italy and India.

The Hungaria asteroid 5806 Archieroy, discovered by American astronomer Edward Bowell was named in his honor in 1994. In 2004 he was awarded the Myers Memorial Medal for outstanding contributions to psychical research by the Society for Psychical Research.

== Death ==
On 27 December 2012 Roy died at the Drumchapel Hospital at the age of 88. He was survived by his wife, three sons and two grandchildren.

== Novels ==
- Deadlight (1968)
- All Evil Shed Away (1970)
- The Curtained Sleep (1971)
- Sable Night (1973)
- The Dark Host (1976)
- Devil In The Darkness (1978)

== Non-fiction ==
- The Foundations of Astrodynamics (1965)
- Orbital Motion (1978)
- Long-Term Dynamical Behavior of Natural and Artificial N-Body Systems (Ed.) (1989)
- A Sense of Something Strange, Investigations Into the Paranormal (1990)
- Oxford Illustrated encyclopedia of the Universe (Ed.) (1992)
- Archives of the Mind (1996)
- From Newton to Chaos (Ed. with Bonnie A Steves) (1995)
- The Dynamics of Small Bodies in the Solar System: A Major Key to Solar Systems Studies (Ed. with Bonnie A Steves) (1998)
- The Eager Dead (2008)
