= Hillfoot railway station =

Railway station in East Dunbartonshire, Scotland

Hillfoot Scottish Gaelic: Bun a' Chnuic
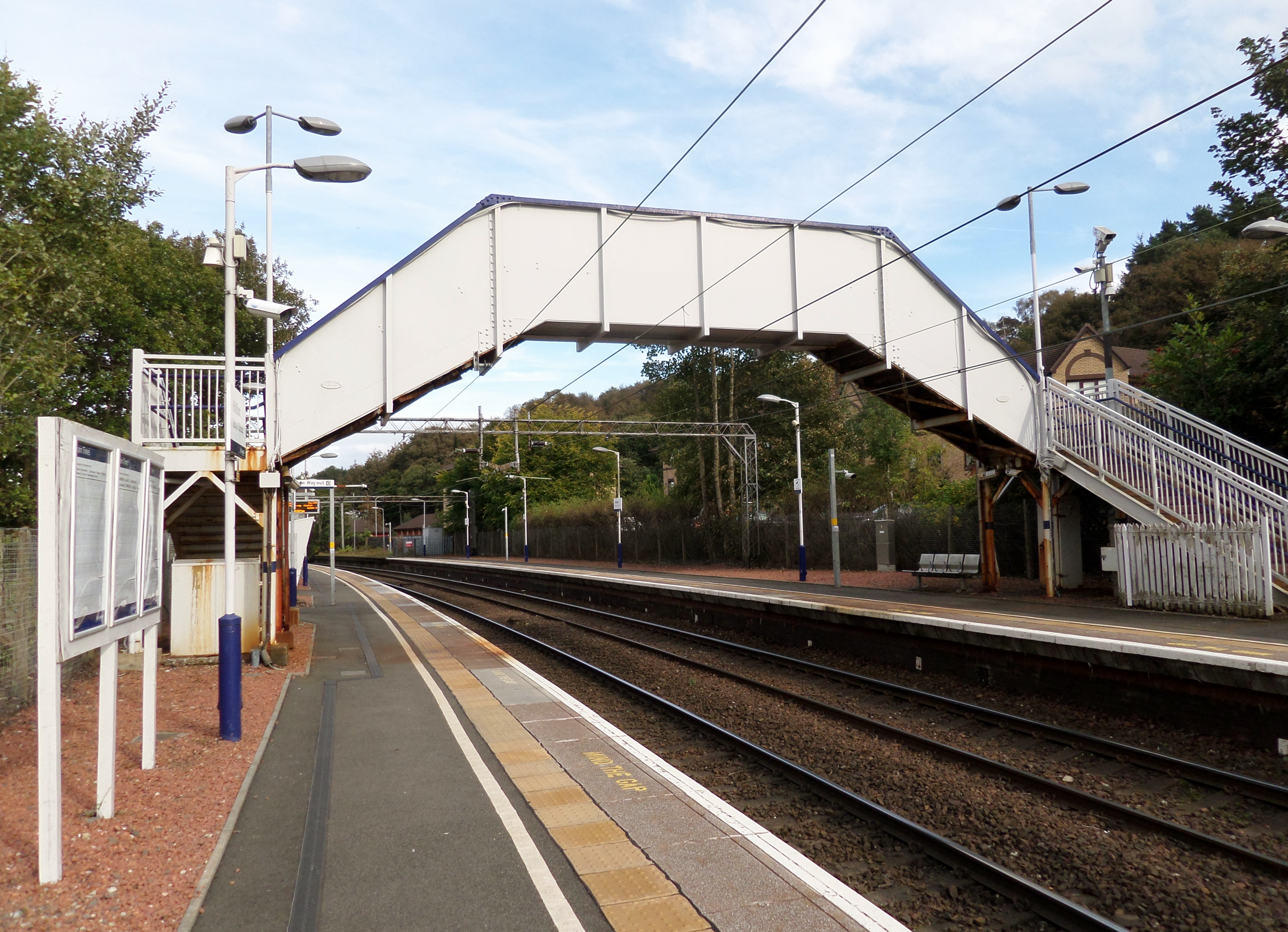

General information
- Location: Bearsden, East Dunbartonshire; Scotland
- Coordinates: 55.9203°N 4.3199°W
- Grid reference: NS550721
- Manager: ScotRail
- Platforms: 2

Other information
- Station code: HLF

Key dates
- 1 May 1900: Opened

Passengers
- 2021/22: ▲0.124 million
- 2022/23: ▲0.183 million
- 2023/24: ▲0.231 million
- 2024/25: ▲0.258 million
- 2025/26: ▲0.272 million
Location
Notes
- Passenger statistics from the Office of Rail and Road

Hillfoot railway station is a railway station in Bearsden, East Dunbartonshire near Glasgow, Scotland. The station is managed by ScotRail and is served by their trains on the Argyle and North Clyde Lines. It is sited between Milngavie and Bearsden, 7 miles 66 chains (12.6 km) from Glasgow Queen Street, measured via Maryhill.

== History ==
It was opened on 1 May 1900, after the Milngavie branch was double tracked.

== Facilities ==
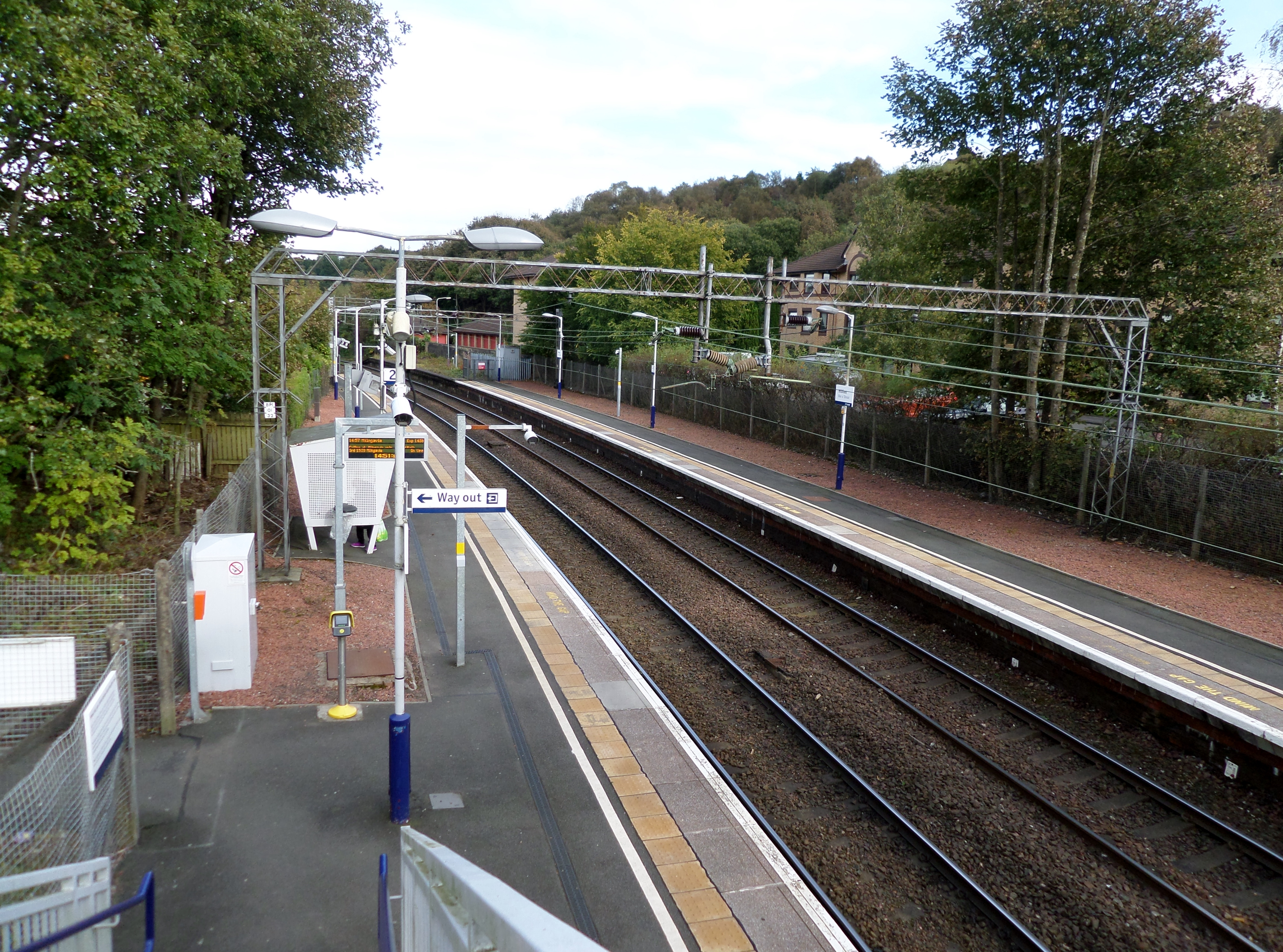
The station seen in 2016

The station has a small car park but no ticket office or ticket machine. As there are no facilities to purchase tickets, passengers must buy one in advance, or from the guard on the train. Both platforms have shelters, help points and benches, and there are bike racks adjacent to platform 1. Both platforms have step-free entrances, but the footbridge only has steps.

== Passenger volume ==
Passenger Volume at Hillfoot
	2002–03	2004–05	2005–06	2006–07	2007–08	2008–09	2009–10	2010–11	2011–12	2012–13	2013–14	2014–15	2015–16	2016–17	2017–18	2018–19	2019–20	2020–21	2021–22	2022–23
Entries and exits	133,270	165,924	200,259	218,733	241,921	280,494	278,596	288,000	308,696	318,386	309,334	326,896	318,676	317,532	317,556	331,928	334,830	23,778	124,040	182,970

The statistics cover twelve month periods that start in April.

== Services ==
On weekdays and Saturdays, trains run every 30 minutes northbound to Milngavie, and southbound to Springburn, via Glasgow Queen Street (low level). In the evenings and on Sundays, trains run southbound to Motherwell, via Hamilton Central, at the same twice-hourly frequency.

Preceding station	National Rail	Following station
Bearsden	ScotRail; Dalmuir–Carstairs	Milngavie
Bearsden	ScotRail; Helensburgh Central–Edinburgh Waverley	Milngavie

== Cultural references ==
The station is used in the BBC comedy series Burnistoun.

== Bibliography ==
- Quick, Michael (2022). Railway Passenger Stations in Great Britain: A Chronology (PDF) (5th ed.). London: Railway and Canal Historical Society.
