= Drumchapel railway station =

Railway station in Glasgow, Scotland

Drumchapel Scottish Gaelic: Druim a' Chaibeil
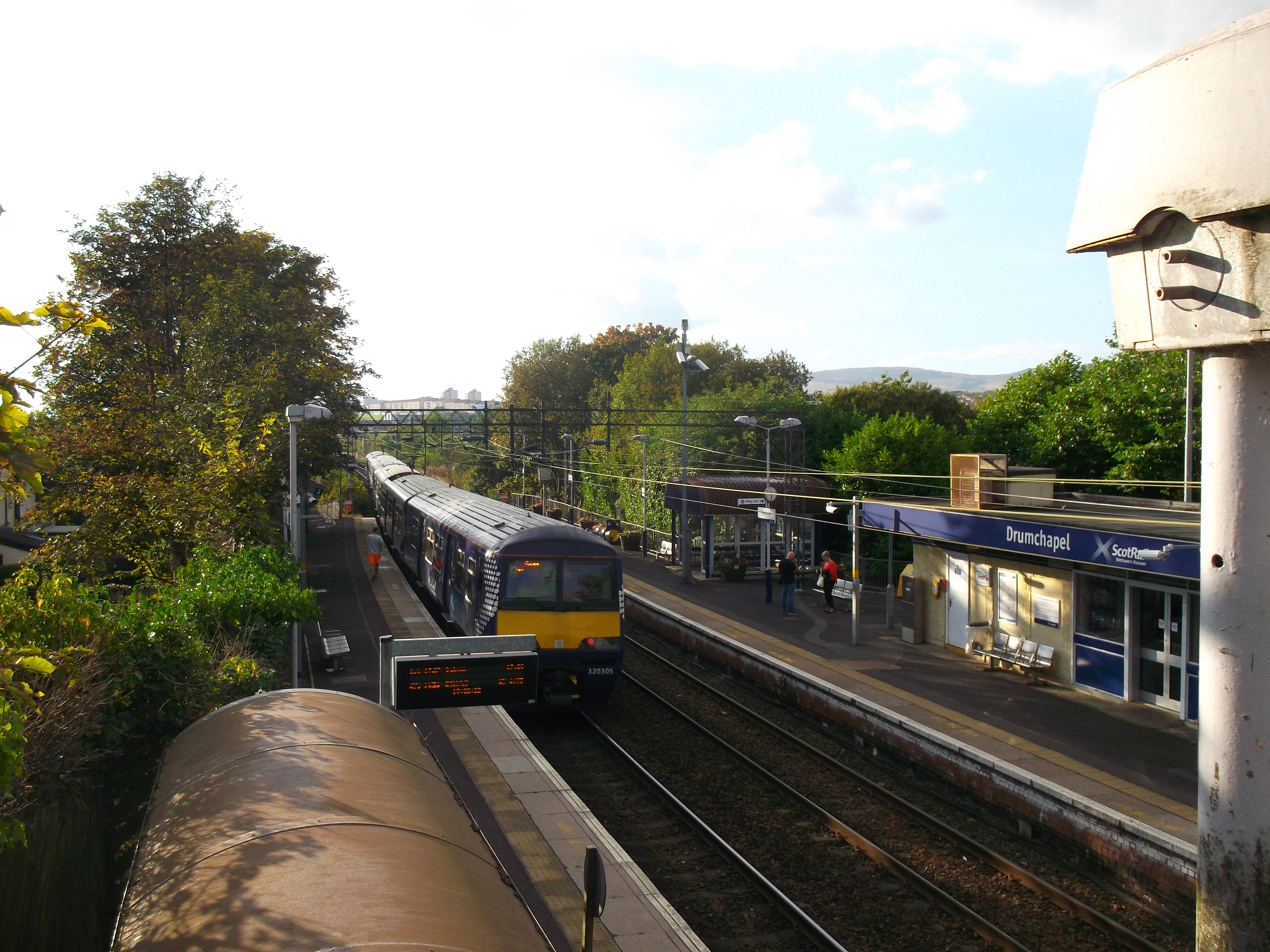
- Drumchapel railway station, with a train departing the westbound platform

General information
- Location: Drumchapel, Glasgow; Scotland
- Coordinates: 55.9047°N 4.3630°W
- Grid reference: NS523704
- Manager: ScotRail
- Transit authority: SPT
- Platforms: 2

Other information
- Station code: DMC

Key dates
- 1 May 1890: Opened

Passengers
- 2021/22: ▲0.191 million
- 2022/23: ▲0.236 million
- 2023/24: ▲0.300 million
- 2024/25: ▲0.331 million
- 2025/26: ▲0.337 million
Location
Notes
- Passenger statistics from the Office of Rail and Road

Drumchapel railway station serves the Drumchapel, Blairdardie and Old Drumchapel areas of Glasgow, Scotland. The station is managed by ScotRail and is served by trains on the Argyle Line and North Clyde Line. It is situated between Westerton to the east and Drumry to the west, and is located 7 miles 20 chains (11.7 km) from Glasgow Queen Street (High Level), measured via Maryhill.

== History ==
The station opened on 1 May 1890 or in 1891, although there had been a railway line through the town since 1858. Accordingly the opening of the station allowed for significant housing developments on either side of the line.

== Facilities ==
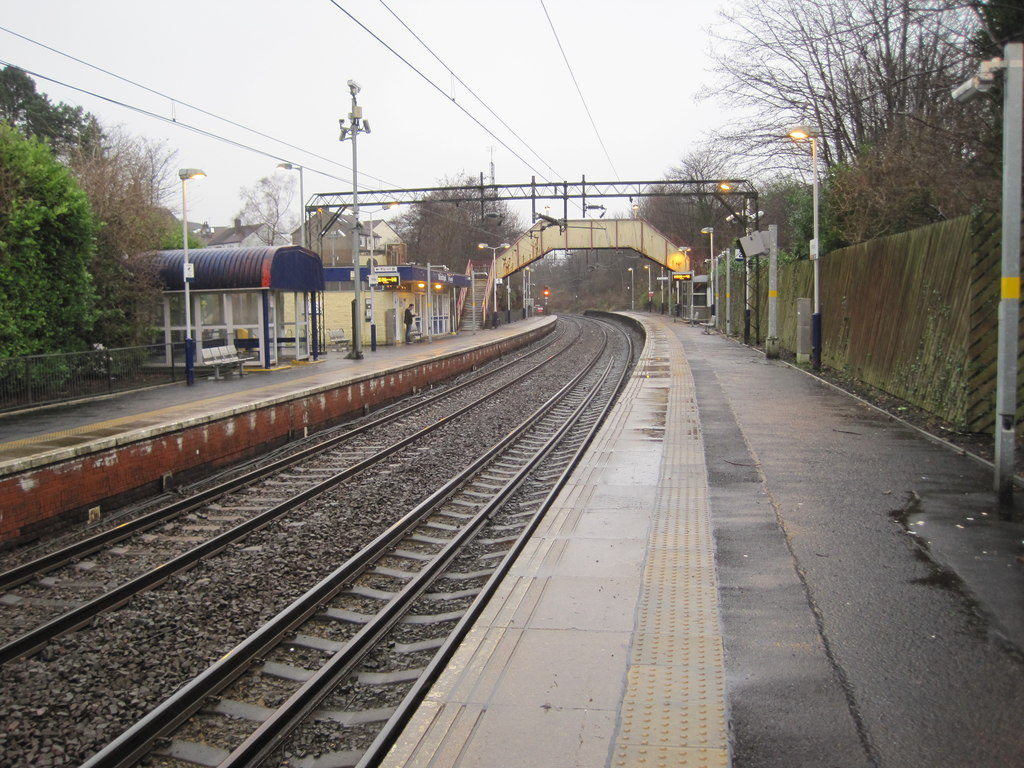
The station seen in 2012

The station has a small car park, with a staffed ticket office and a ticket machine. Both platforms have help points, shelters and benches, with bike racks adjacent to the car park. There is also a bus stop for the number 3 (formerly along with the number 16) operated by First Glasgow with services to Govan.

== Passenger volume ==
Passenger Volume at Drumchapel
	2002–03	2004–05	2005–06	2006–07	2007–08	2008–09	2009–10	2010–11	2011–12	2012–13	2013–14	2014–15	2015–16	2016–17	2017–18	2018–19	2019–20	2020–21	2021–22	2022–23
Entries and exits	213,644	244,174	292,530	299,686	309,314	349,794	356,140	370,858	387,028	405,038	376,238	383,890	385,420	360,184	343,572	337,244	323,854	50,794	191,328	236,092

The statistics cover twelve-month periods that start in April.

== Services ==
On Mondays to Saturdays, trains between Balloch and Airdrie stop each way every 30 minutes. In addition to these North Clyde Line services, there are two Argyle Line trains per hour between Dalmuir and Larkhall. On Sundays, there is a half-hourly service to Edinburgh via Airdrie and to Helensburgh Central.

Preceding station	National Rail	Following station
Westerton	ScotRail; Argyle Line	Drumry
Westerton	ScotRail; North Clyde Line	Drumry
	Historical railways	
Westerton	North British Railway; Glasgow, Dumbarton and Helensburgh Railway	Singer

== Bibliography ==
- Butt, R. V. J. (October 1995). The Directory of Railway Stations: details every public and private passenger station, halt, platform and stopping place, past and present (1st ed.). Sparkford: Patrick Stephens Ltd. ISBN 978-1-85260-508-7. OCLC 60251199. OL 11956311M.
- Jowett, Alan (March 1989). Jowett's Railway Atlas of Great Britain and Ireland: From Pre-Grouping to the Present Day (1st ed.). Sparkford: Patrick Stephens Ltd. ISBN 978-1-85260-086-0. OCLC 22311137.
- Quick, Michael (2022). Railway Passenger Stations in Great Britain: A Chronology (PDF) (5th ed.). London: Railway and Canal Historical Society.
