= Robert Wilson Dron =

Scottish geologist and mining engineer (1869–1932)

Robert Wilson Dron FRSE MA MICE PIME (1869–1932) was a Scottish geologist and mining engineer, writing many authoritative books on coal-mining. He was Professor of Mining Technology at the University of Glasgow. He was founder of the mining company R W Dron & Sons. He served as President of the Mining Institute of Scotland from 1923 to 1925.

== Life ==
He was born in Glasgow in 1869, the son of Alexander Dron a manufacturing engineer. In 1893 he appears as Manager of the Coal and Fire Clay Mine in Provanhall near Glasgow, owned by R & J Mather.

In 1901 he founded R W Dron & Sons, having offices at 55 West Regent Street in Glasgow. At this time he lived in a large mansion: Utica on Thorn Drive/Westbourne Drive in Bearsden. He was a member of the Glasgow Geological Society.

He advised on mining in various foreign locations from the Caucasus Mountains to Spitzbergen, and from Nova Scotia to California.

He was elected a Fellow of the Royal Society of Edinburgh in 1917. His proposers were John Horne, Ben Peach, Sir John Smith Flett and Thomas James Jehu.

In 1922 he was appointed Professor of Mining at Glasgow University and continued this role until death. The university awarded him an honorary degree (MA) in recognition of his work.

He died at home in Bearsden on 16 April 1932.

== Publications ==
- A Textbook of Mining Formulae (1892)
- The Coal-Fields of Scotland (1902) (revised 1921)
- The Occurrence of Coking Coal in Scotland (1918)
- Analyses of British Coke and Coal (1924) joint author
- Lighting of Mines (1924)
- The Economics of Coal-Mining (1928)
