= Drumry railway station =

Railway station in West Dunbartonshire, Scotland

Drumry Scottish Gaelic: Druim Rìgh
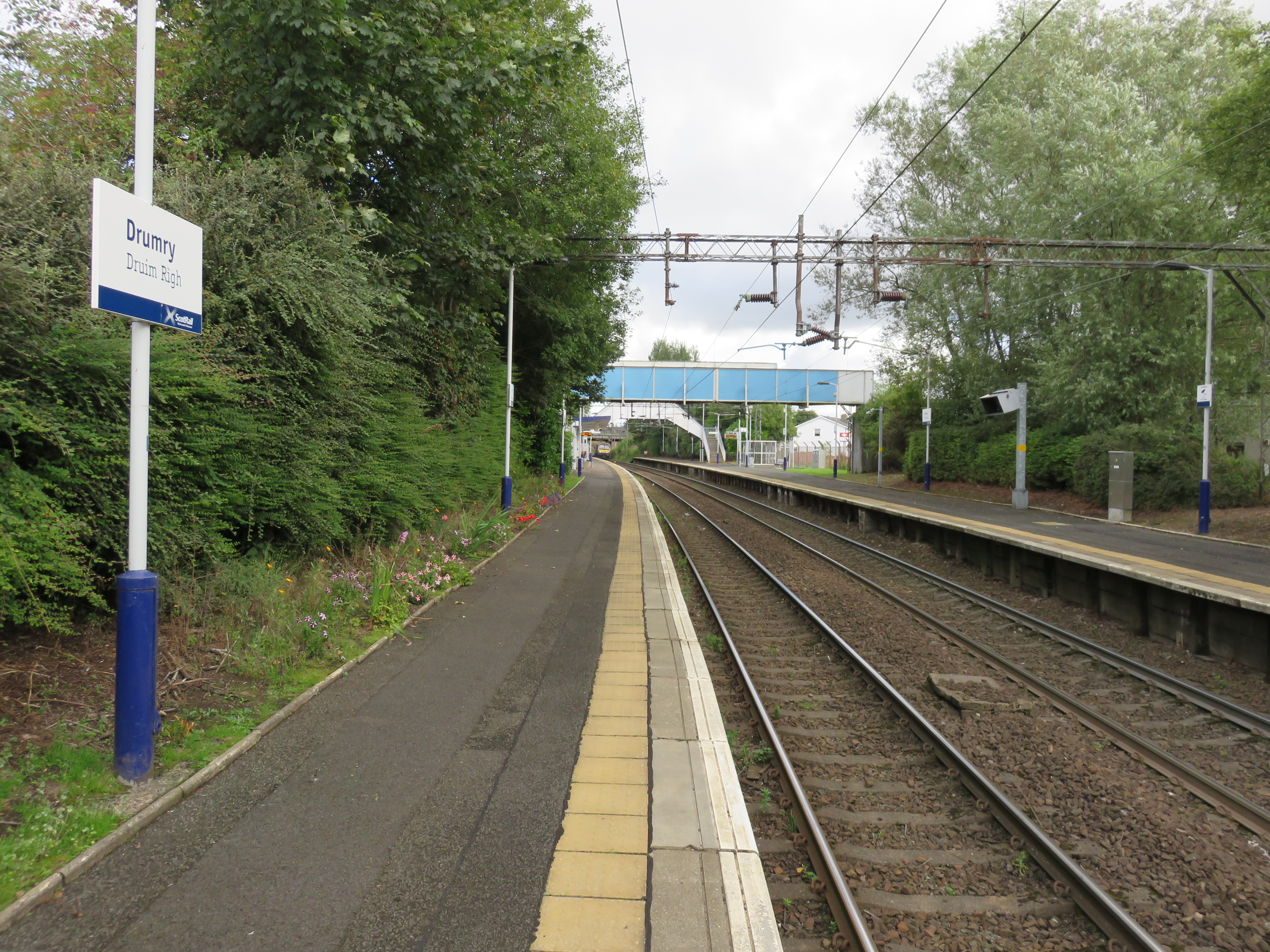

General information
- Location: Clydebank, West Dunbartonshire; Scotland
- Coordinates: 55.9046°N 4.3854°W
- Grid reference: NS509705
- Manager: ScotRail
- Transit authority: SPT
- Platforms: 2

Other information
- Station code: DMY

Key dates
- 6 April 1953: Opened

Passengers
- 2021/22: ▲0.111 million
- 2022/23: ▲0.136 million
- 2023/24: ▲0.200 million
- 2024/25: ▲0.233 million
- 2025/26: ▲0.251 million
Location
Notes
- Passenger statistics from the Office of Rail and Road

Drumry railway station serves the Drumry and Linnvale area of Clydebank, West Dunbartonshire, Scotland. The railway station is managed by ScotRail and is served by trains on the Argyle Line and North Clyde Line. It is situated between Singer to the west and Drumchapel to the east, 8 miles 10 chains (13.1 km) from Glasgow Queen Street, measured via Maryhill.

== History ==
Drumry station was opened on 6 April 1953 to serve two of the new housing schemes that were built post World War II on the northern edges of the Burgh of Clydebank, nearly a century after the opening of the line itself through the town.

== Facilities ==
The station has a small car park and has cycle stands. It also has a staffed ticket office and a ticket machine, with help points, shelters and benches.

Work to replace the platform surfaces by Network Rail was carried out between January and June 2022.

== Passenger volume ==
Passenger Volume at Drumry
| | 2002–03 | 2004–05 | 2005–06 | 2006–07 | 2007–08 | 2008–09 | 2009–10 | 2010–11 | 2011–12 | 2012–13 | 2013–14 | 2014–15 | 2015–16 | 2016–17 | 2017–18 | 2018–19 | 2019–20 | 2020–21 | 2021–22 | 2022–23 |
|---|---|---|---|---|---|---|---|---|---|---|---|---|---|---|---|---|---|---|---|---|
| Entries and exits | 154,778 | 178,304 | 215,321 | 204,598 | 209,604 | 230,578 | 225,664 | 229,366 | 243,974 | 257,370 | 247,050 | 251,294 | 253,840 | 251,204 | 243,874 | 248,224 | 235,514 | 33,856 | 110,828 | 136,122 |

The statistics cover twelve-month periods that start in April.

== Services ==
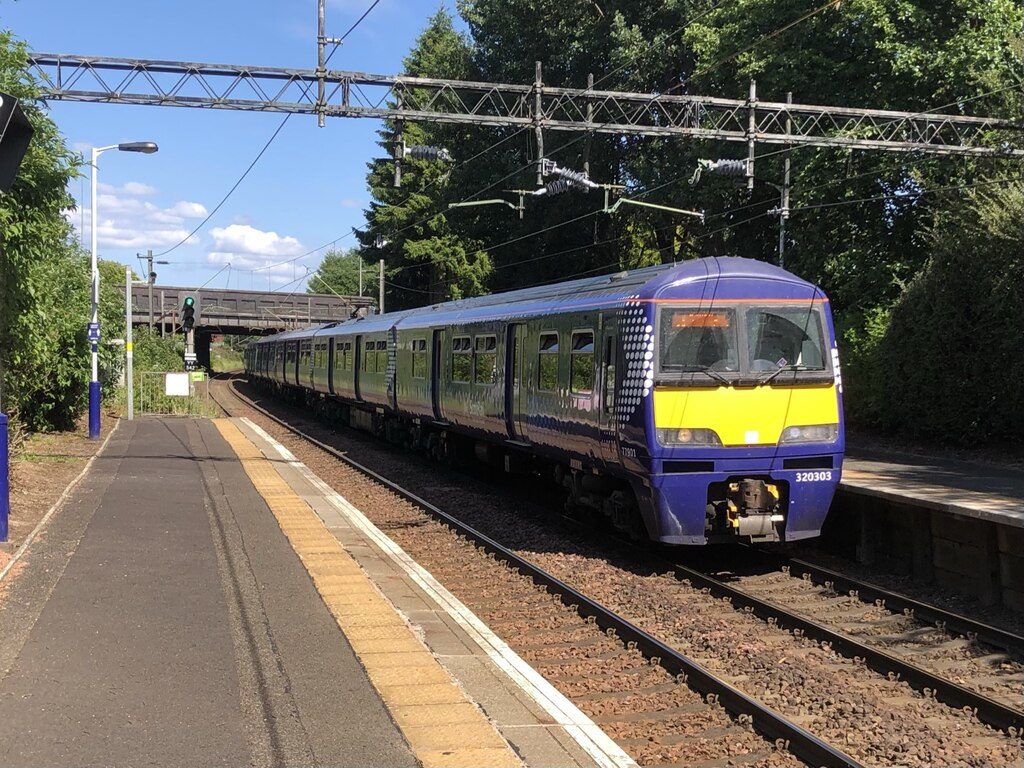
A Class 320 arriving at Drumry

On Mondays-Saturdays, trains between Balloch and Airdrie stop each way every 30 minutes. In addition to these North Clyde Line services, there are two Argyle Line trains per hour between Dalmuir and Larkhall. On Sundays, there is a half-hourly service to Edinburgh via Airdrie and to Helensburgh Central.

| Preceding station | National Rail | Following station |
|---|---|---|
| Drumchapel | ScotRail; Argyle Line | Singer |
| Drumchapel | ScotRail; North Clyde Line | Singer |

== Bibliography ==
- Butt, R. V. J. (October 1995). The Directory of Railway Stations: details every public and private passenger station, halt, platform and stopping place, past and present (1st ed.). Sparkford: Patrick Stephens Ltd. ISBN 978-1-85260-508-7. OCLC 60251199. OL 11956311M.
- Jowett, Alan (March 1989). Jowett's Railway Atlas of Great Britain and Ireland: From Pre-Grouping to the Present Day (1st ed.). Sparkford: Patrick Stephens Ltd. ISBN 978-1-85260-086-0. OCLC 22311137.
- Quick, Michael (2022). Railway Passenger Stations in Great Britain: A Chronology (PDF) (5th ed.). London: Railway and Canal Historical Society.
