= Drumchapel St Andrew's Church =

- Drumchapel St Andrew's Parish Church
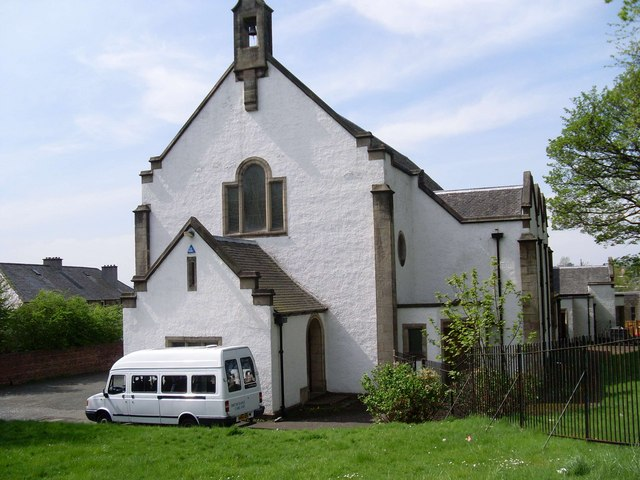
- Drumchapel St Andrew's Church
- 55°54′23″N 4°21′53″W
- Location: Glasgow
- Country: Scotland
- Denomination: Church of Scotland
- Website: drumchapelstandrews.org

History
- Former name: Drumchapel Old Church
- Status: Active

Architecture
- Functional status: Parish church
- Architect: Lancelot H. Ross
- Architectural type: Rectangular plan church
- Years built: 1940

Administration
- Parish: Old Drumchapel, Drumchapel, Drumry

Listed Building – Category C(S)
- Designated: 10 July 1989
- Reference no.: LB32273

Drumchapel St Andrew's Church is a 20th-century parish church of the Church of Scotland located in the Old Drumchapel area of Glasgow. The church is sometimes referred to as the "White Church" due to its white painted walls.

== History of the building ==
The church was built in 1939 on designs by Lancelot H. Ross who had drawn plans in 1937. The church includes Venetian windows. The church was built to replace the original Drumchapel Old Church which was located at 102 Drumchapel Road and was built in 1901. Ross' church was damaged during the Clydebank Blitz of 1941. It was restored after the Second World War.

== History of the congregation ==
The parish of Old Drumchapel was founded in 1893 as a mission of New Kilpatrick Parish, before becoming an independent parish in 1923. In 1995, the congregation of Drumchapel St Andrew's united with Drumchapel Old, adapting the new name Drumchapel St Andrew's but retaining the use of the Drumchapel Old building. A further union occurred in 2011 when the congregation of Drumry St Mary's Church united with Drumchapel St Andrew's.
