= 5806 Archieroy =

Hungaria asteroid

Discovery
- Discovered by: E. Bowell
- Discovery site: Lowell Obs.
- Discovery date: 11 January 1986

Designations
- Named after: Archie Roy (astrophysicist)
- Alternative designations: 1986 AG_{1} · 1987 QQ_{9}
- Minor planet category: main-belt · (inner); Hungaria

Orbital characteristics
- Epoch 4 September 2017 (JD 2458000.5)
- Uncertainty parameter 0
- Observation arc: 62.83 yr (22,948 days)
- Aphelion: 2.0347 AU
- Perihelion: 1.8908 AU
- Semi-major axis: 1.9628 AU
- Eccentricity: 0.0367
- Orbital period (sidereal): 2.75 yr (1,004 days)
- Mean anomaly: 257.13°
- Mean motion: 0° 21^{m} 30.24^{s} / day
- Inclination: 20.816°
- Longitude of ascending node: 300.87°
- Argument of perihelion: 97.285°

Physical characteristics
- Dimensions: 5.75±1.02 km 6.34±1.34 km 6.38 km (calculated); 6.785±0.224 km
- Synodic rotation period: 12.16±0.01 h 12.1602±0.0005 h 12.163±0.001 h 12.187±0.003 h
- Geometric albedo: 0.19±0.10; 0.291±0.063; 0.3 (assumed); 0.37±0.18
- Spectral type: E · V
- Absolute magnitude (H): 12.80 · 12.9 · 13.53

5806 Archieroy, provisional designation 1986 AG_{1}, is a stony Hungaria asteroid from the inner regions of the asteroid belt, approximately 6 kilometers in diameter. It was discovered on 11 January 1986, by American astronomer Edward Bowell at Lowell's Anderson Mesa Station near Flagstaff, Arizona. It is named after Scottish astrophysicist Archie Roy.

== Classification and orbit ==
The bright E-type asteroid, alternatively classified as a V-type, is a member of the Hungaria family, which form the innermost dense concentration of asteroids in the Solar System. It orbits the Sun in the inner main-belt at a distance of 1.9–2.0 AU once every 2 years and 9 months (1,004 days). Its orbit has an eccentricity of 0.04 and an inclination of 21° with respect to the ecliptic. A first precovery was taken at Palomar Observatory in 1954, extending the asteroid's observation arc by 32 years prior to its official discovery observation at Anderson Mesa.

== Lightcurve ==
Between 2004 and 2015, several rotational lightcurves of Archieroy have been obtained from photometric observations by American astronomers Brian Warner at his Palmer Divide Observatory, Colorado, and Robert Stephens at the Center for Solar System Studies, California. Lightcurve analysis (Note: lightcurve plots by Brian Warner and Robert Stephens of (5806) Archieroy) gave a well-defined rotation period between 12.16 and 12.187 hours with a high brightness variation of 0.34 to 0.47 magnitude (U=3-/3/3/3).

== Diameter and albedo ==
According to the survey carried out by NASA's Wide-field Infrared Survey Explorer with its subsequent NEOWISE mission, Archieroy measures between 5.75 and 6.78 kilometers in diameter, and its surface has an albedo between 0.19 and 0.37, while the Collaborative Asteroid Lightcurve Link assumes an albedo of 0.30 – a compromise value between 0.4 and 0.2, corresponding to the Hungaria asteroids both as family and orbital group – and calculates a diameter of 6.38 kilometers, with an absolute magnitude of 12.9.

== Naming ==
This minor planet was named after Scottish astrophysicist and celestial mechanician Archie Roy (1924–2012), who was a Fellow of the Royal Society of Edinburgh, the Royal Astronomical Society, and the British Interplanetary Society, as well as the president of the Society for Psychical Research and professor at Glasgow University. His research included the restricted and general three-body problems, high-order Taylor series and the long-term stability of and the orbital resonances in the Solar System. He has also authored and published several textbooks and novels. The approved naming citation was published by the Minor Planet Center on 19 October 1994 (M.P.C. 24123).
