= Bearsden railway station =

Railway station in East Dunbartonshire, Scotland

Bearsden
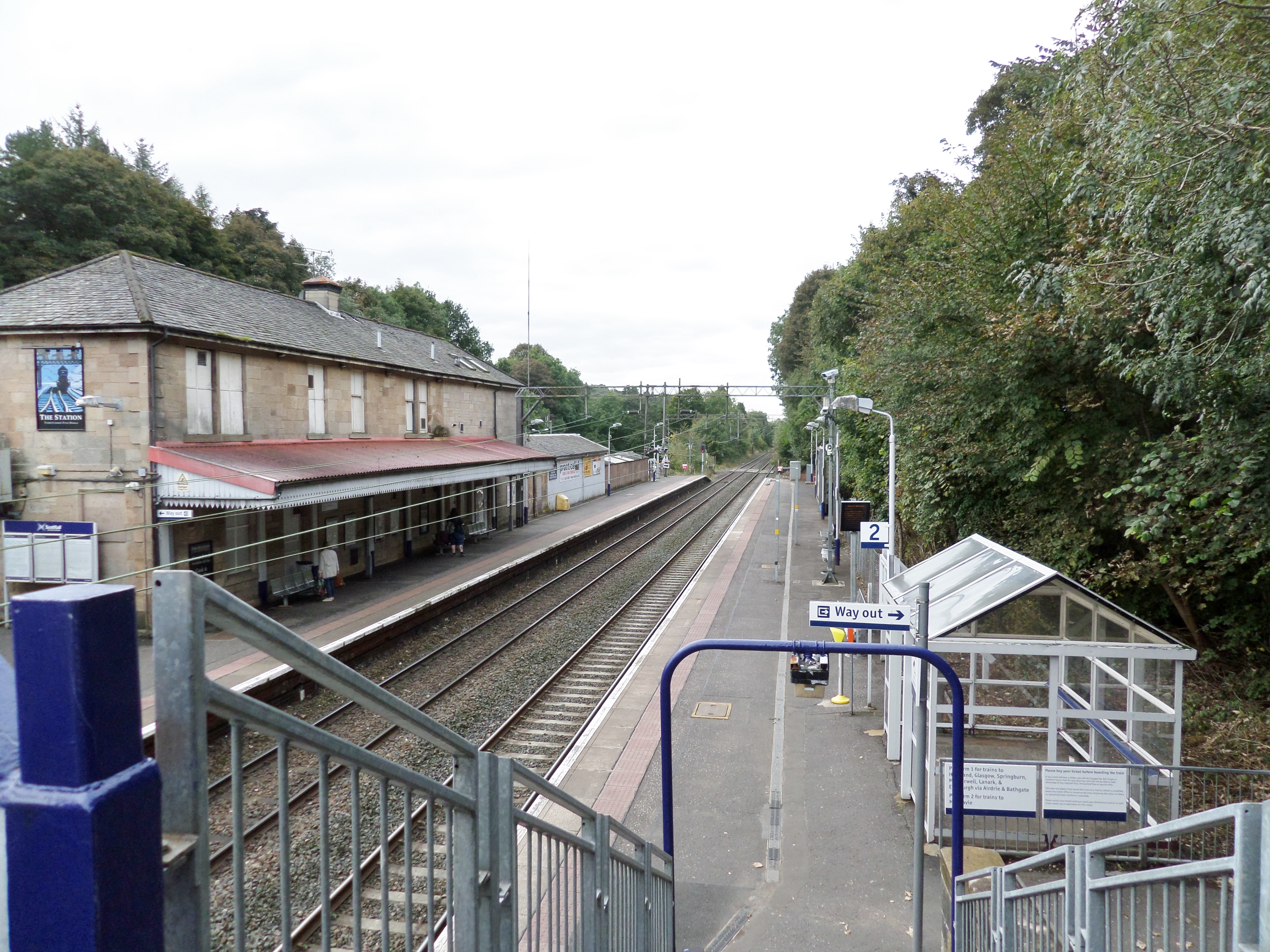

General information
- Location: Bearsden, East Dunbartonshire; Scotland
- Coordinates: 55.9170°N 4.3324°W
- Grid reference: NS543717
- Manager: ScotRail
- Platforms: 2

Other information
- Station code: BRN

History
- Opened: 20 April 1863; 163 years ago

Passengers
- 2021/22: ▲0.222 million
- 2022/23: ▲0.307 million
- 2023/24: ▲0.391 million
- 2024/25: ▲0.400 million
- 2025/26: ▲0.414 million
Location
Notes
- Passenger statistics from the Office of Rail and Road

Bearsden railway station serves Bearsden, East Dunbartonshire near Glasgow, Scotland. The railway station is managed by ScotRail and lies on the Argyle Line and North Clyde Lines. It is located between Westerton and Hillfoot on the line to Milngavie, and is 7 miles 21 chains (11.7 km) from Glasgow Queen Street, measured via Maryhill.

== History ==
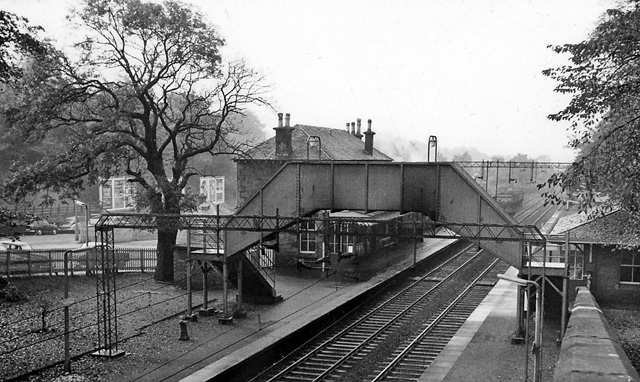
The station looking south towards Westerton in 1961

The station opened along with the line to Milngavie on 20 April 1863.

The naming is unusual in that the current title of the town (which was originally New Kilpatrick) was taken from the station name, rather than the town giving its name to the station.

In 2023, Linbrooke Services Ltd was found guilty of health and safety at height regulations over a 2018 death of a worker who was installing a public address system.

== Facilities ==
The station is well equipped, with a ticket office and ticket machine on platform 1, and shelters, benches and help points on both platforms. There is a pub and a car park and bike racks adjacent to platform 1. All of the station has step-free access, but the footbridge only has steps, so passengers needing access to platform 2 must use the ramp from Drymen Road.

== Passenger volume ==
Passenger volume at Bearsden
	2002–03	2004–05	2005–06	2006–07	2007–08	2008–09	2009–10	2010–11	2011–12	2012–13	2013–14	2014–15	2015–16	2016–17	2017–18	2018–19	2019–20	2020–21	2021–22	2022–23
Entries and exits	256,252	324,602	378,360	419,891	446,277	497,514	486,600	495,454	534,454	570,742	537,886	570,722	565,354	555,990	542,322	550,546	549,580	56,438	222,160	307,430

The statistics cover twelve month periods that start in April.

== Services ==
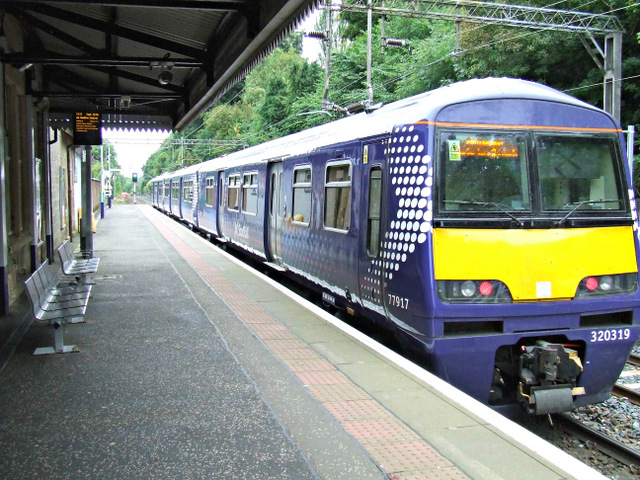
A Class 320 at Bearsden

On weekdays and Saturdays, trains run every 30 minutes northbound to Milngavie, and southbound to Springburn, via Glasgow Queen Street (low level). In the evenings and on Sundays, trains run southbound to Motherwell, via Hamilton Central, at the same twice-hourly frequency.

Preceding station	National Rail	Following station
Westerton	ScotRail; Argyle Line	Hillfoot
Westerton	ScotRail; North Clyde Line	Hillfoot

== Bibliography ==
- Quick, Michael (2022). Railway Passenger Stations in Great Britain: A Chronology (PDF) (5th ed.). London: Railway and Canal Historical Society. Archived from the original (PDF) on 15 March 2023.
