= Singer railway station =

Railway station in West Dunbartonshire, Scotland

Singer
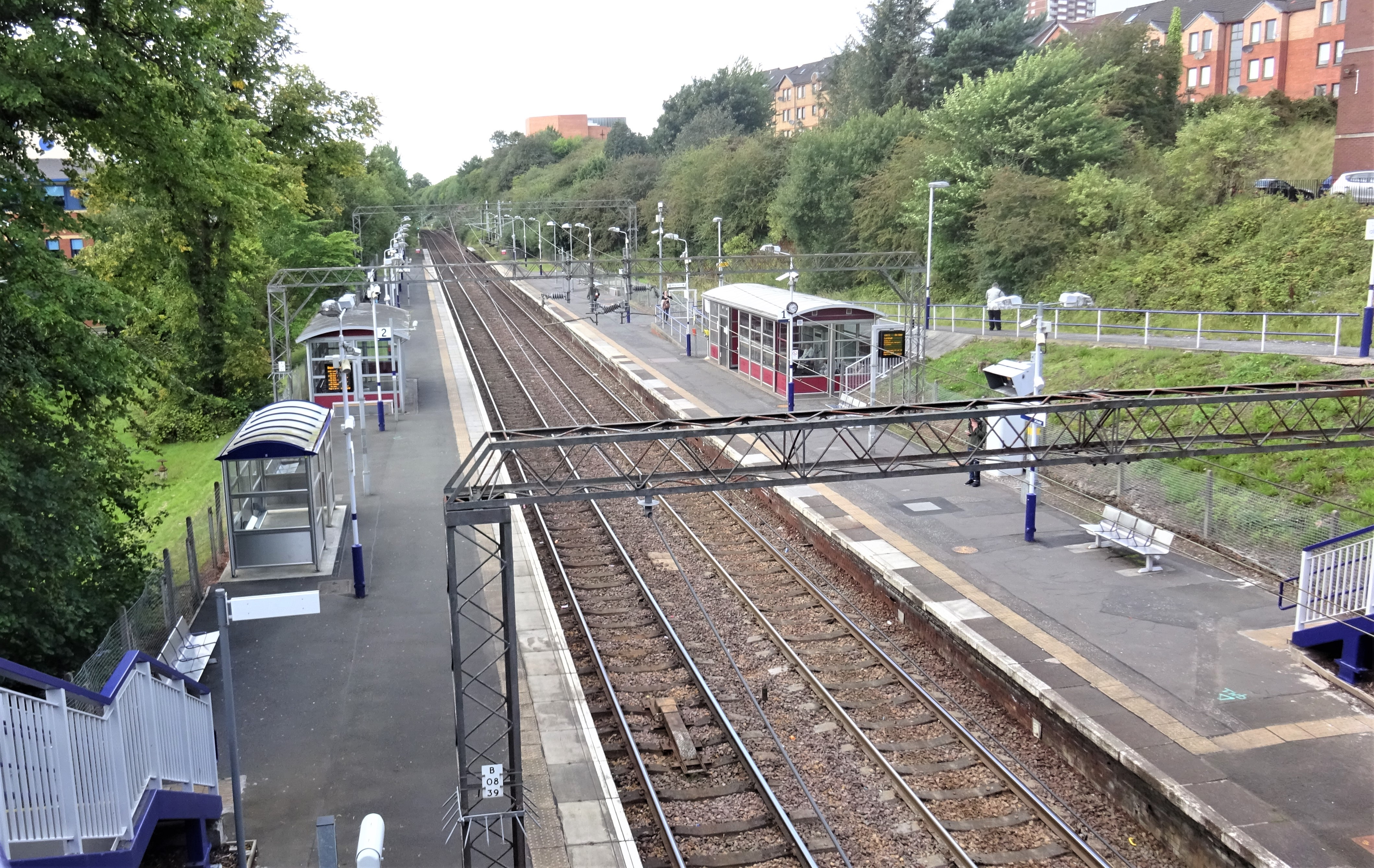

General information
- Location: Clydebank, West Dunbartonshire; Scotland
- Coordinates: 55.9075°N 4.4055°W
- Grid reference: NS497708
- Manager: ScotRail
- Transit authority: Strathclyde Partnership for Transport
- Platforms: 2

Other information
- Station code: SIN

History
- Original company: North British Railway
- Pre-grouping: North British Railway
- Post-grouping: LNER

Key dates
- 3 November 1907: Opened legally
- 4 November 1907: First trains
- C. 1913: Renamed to Singer for Kilbowie & Radnor Park
- 1942: Singer Workers Platform opened
- May 1948: Name reverted to just Singer
- 1 May 1967: Singer Workers Platform closed

Passengers
- 2021/22: ▲0.234 million
- 2022/23: ▲0.289 million
- 2023/24: ▲0.316 million
- 2024/25: ▲0.358 million
- 2025/26: ▲0.372 million
Location
Notes
- Passenger statistics from the Office of Rail and Road

Singer railway station is a two-platformed staffed station serving Clydebank town centre, West Dunbartonshire, Scotland. It is located on the Argyle Line and North Clyde Line between Drumry and Dalmuir, 9 miles 5 chains (14.6 km) from Glasgow Queen Street, measured via Maryhill. All passenger services are provided by ScotRail.

== History ==
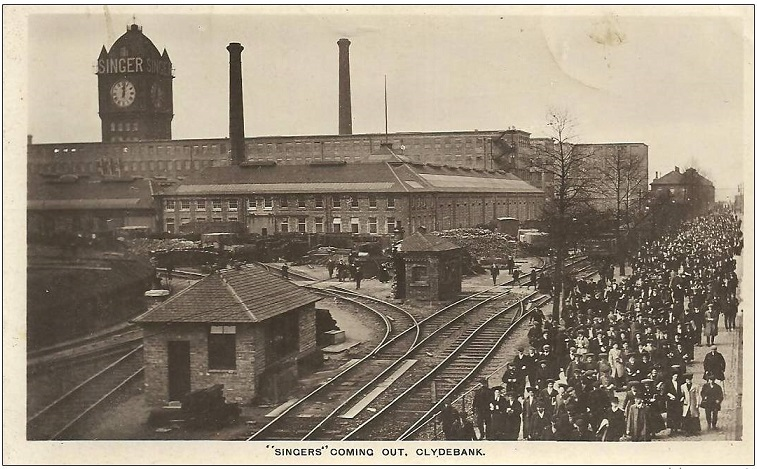
Singer Sewing Machine Factory, Clydebank

Constructed in 1907, Singer station took its name from the large Singer sewing machine factory that it was built to serve. History of the station within the sewing machine factory is not well-documented. The 'station' inside the factory – and the factory itself – were demolished in or before 1998.

The main station replaced the former Kilbowie station, and soon after opening in 1907, it was renamed to Singer for Kilbowie and Radnor Park, reverting to just Singer some time in May 1948.

Until 1996, Singer was the nearest station to Kilbowie Park, former home of Clydebank F.C. (1965).

== Passenger volume ==
Passenger Volume at Singer
	2002–03	2004–05	2005–06	2006–07	2007–08	2008–09	2009–10	2010–11	2011–12	2012–13	2013–14	2014–15	2015–16	2016–17	2017–18	2018–19	2019–20	2020–21	2021–22	2022–23
Entries and exits	483,400	538,634	631,782	620,534	683,374	712,904	668,796	685,080	629,626	641,210	638,418	665,536	646,864	660,346	631,430	575,008	522,712	68,590	234,144	288,890

The statistics cover twelve-month periods that start in April.

== Services ==
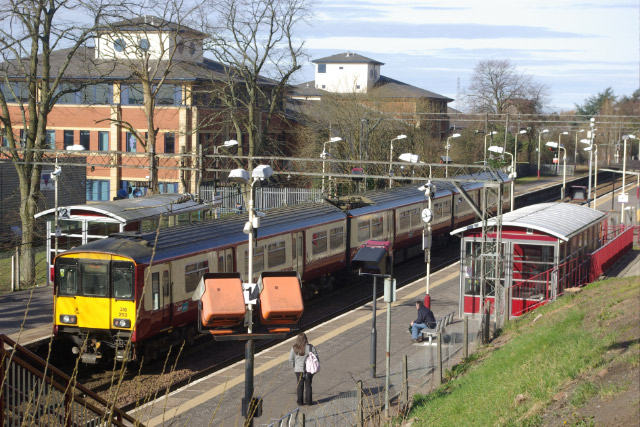
An Argyle Line service

On Mondays-Saturdays, trains between Balloch and Airdrie stop each way every 30 minutes. In addition to these North Clyde Line services, there are two Argyle Line trains per hour between Dalmuir and Larkhall. On Sundays, there is a half-hourly service to Edinburgh via Airdrie and to Helensburgh Central. There is also one train per day from Oban which calls here in the morning peak to Glasgow Queen Street. This operates via Maryhill.

Preceding station	National Rail	Following station
Drumry	ScotRail; Argyle Line	Dalmuir
Drumry	ScotRail; North Clyde Line	Dalmuir
	Historical railways	
Drumchapel	North British Railway; Glasgow, Dumbarton and Helensburgh Railway	Dalmuir

== Bibliography ==
- Butt, R. V. J. (October 1995). The Directory of Railway Stations: details every public and private passenger station, halt, platform and stopping place, past and present (1st ed.). Sparkford: Patrick Stephens Ltd. ISBN 978-1-85260-508-7. OCLC 60251199. OL 11956311M.
- Jowett, Alan (March 1989). Jowett's Railway Atlas of Great Britain and Ireland: From Pre-Grouping to the Present Day (1st ed.). Sparkford: Patrick Stephens Ltd. ISBN 978-1-85260-086-0. OCLC 22311137.
- Gray, Alastair McIntosh (1989). A History of Scotland:Modern Times. Oxford: Oxford University Press. ISBN 978-0-19-917063-0.
- Quick, Michael (2022). Railway Passenger Stations in Great Britain: A Chronology (PDF) (5th ed.). London: Railway and Canal Historical Society.
- Yonge, John (May 1987). Gerald Jacobs (ed.). British Rail Track Diagrams - Book 1: ScotRail (1st ed.). Exeter: Quail Map Company. ISBN 0-9006-0948-6.
- Yonge, John (February 1993). Gerald Jacobs (ed.). Railway Track Diagrams - Book 1: Scotland and the Isle of Man (2nd ed.). Exeter: Quail Map Company. ISBN 0-9006-0995-8.
- Yonge, John (April 1996). Gerald Jacobs (ed.). Railway Track Diagrams - Book 1: Scotland and the Isle of Man (3rd ed.). Exeter: Quail Map Company. ISBN 1-8983-1919-7.
- Yonge, John (2007). Gerald Jacobs (ed.). Railway Track Diagrams - Book 1: Scotland & Isle of Man (Quail Track Plans) (fifth ed.). Bradford on Avon: Trackmaps (formerly Quail Map Co). ISBN 978-0-9549866-3-6. OCLC 79435248.
