= Drumchapel Hospital =

- NHS Greater Glasgow and Clyde
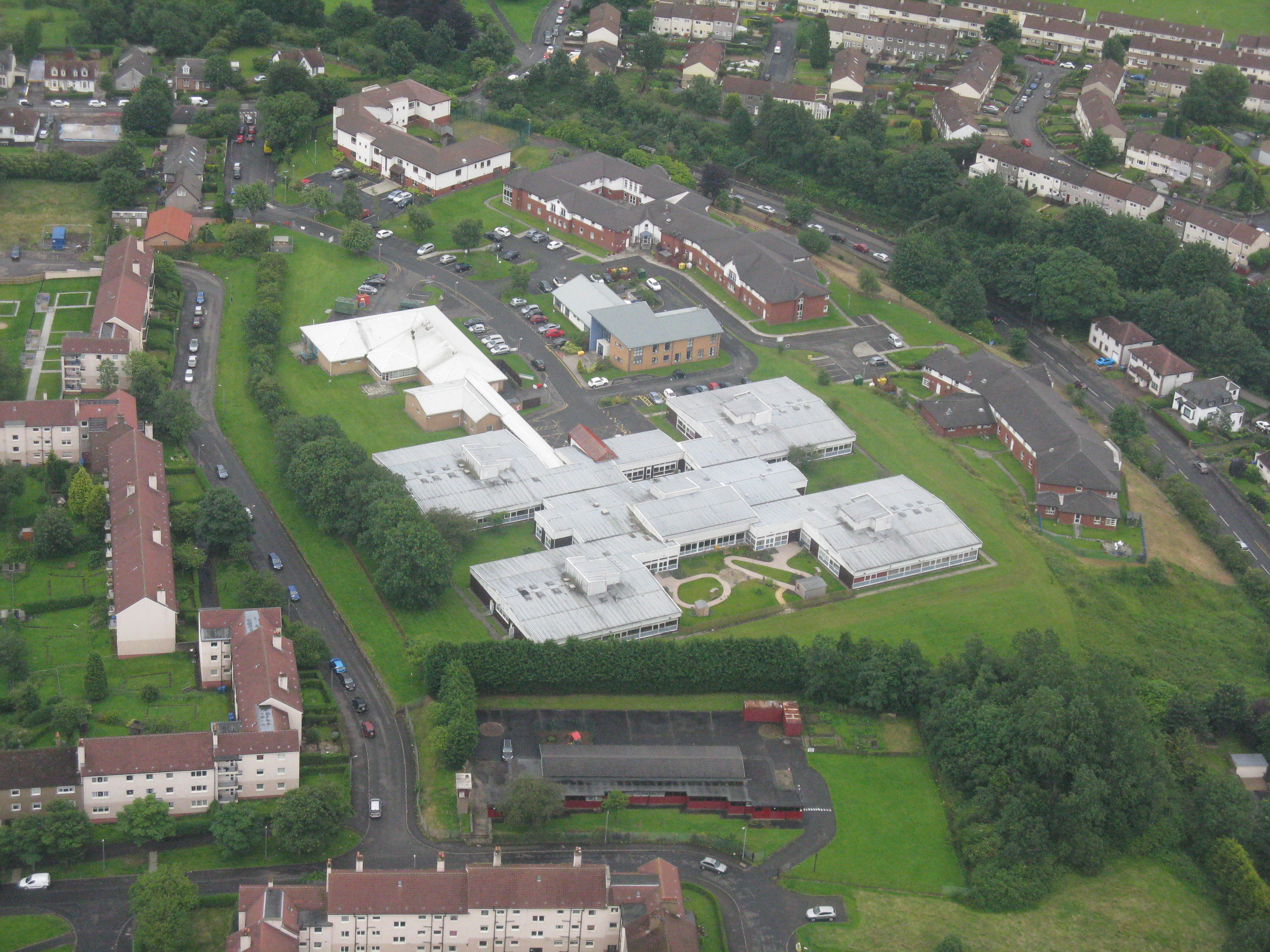
- Drumchapel Hospital

- Shown in Glasgow

Geography
- Location: Drumchapel Road, Glasgow, Scotland
- Coordinates: 55.9062°N 4.3596°W

Organisation
- Care system: NHS Scotland
- Type: Geriatric

Services
- Emergency department: No

History
- Founded: 1903
- Closed: 2016

Links
- Lists: Hospitals in Scotland

Drumchapel Hospital was a health facility in Drumchapel Road, Glasgow, Scotland. It was managed by NHS Greater Glasgow and Clyde.

== History ==
The facility was established, following a donation by Miss Margaret Montgomery Paterson, as a Country Branch of the Royal Hospital for Sick Children. It was designed by Robert Bryden and opened in June 1903. It was extended in 1921 and 1930 and, after joining the National Health Service in 1948, a new 120‑bed geriatric unit was added to it in 1968. The original building housing the children's unit was demolished in the 1980s and the hospital subsequently focused entirely on geriatric work. The geriatric facility itself closed in August 2016 and was subsequently demolished.
