= Bearsden =

Town in East Dunbartonshire, Scotland

Coordinates: 55.9195°N 4.3337°W

Bearsden: Scottish Gaelic: Cille Phàdraig Ùr
- The coat of arms of Bearsden Burgh, 1959–75.

- Location within East Dunbartonshire Bearsden (East Dunbartonshire)
- Population: 28,470 (2020)
- OS grid reference: NS542720
- Council area: East Dunbartonshire
- Lieutenancy area: Dunbartonshire
- Country: Scotland
- Sovereign state: United Kingdom
- Post town: GLASGOW
- Postcode district: G61
- Dialling code: 0141
- Police: Scotland
- Fire: Scottish
- Ambulance: Scottish
- UK Parliament: Mid Dunbartonshire
- Scottish Parliament: Strathkelvin and Bearsden Clydebank and Milngavie

Bearsden (/bɛərzˈdɛn/ bairz-DEN) is an affluent town in East Dunbartonshire, Scotland, on the northwestern fringe of Greater Glasgow, approximately six miles (ten kilometres) from the city centre.

The Roman Antonine Wall runs through the town, and the remains of a military bath house can be seen near the town centre. The current settlement began in the 17th century as the kirkton of the parish of New Kilpatrick, and when a railway connection to Glasgow was constructed in 1863, it developed into an affluent suburb of the city.

By 2020, it had an estimated population of 28,470.

== History ==
=== Roman ===
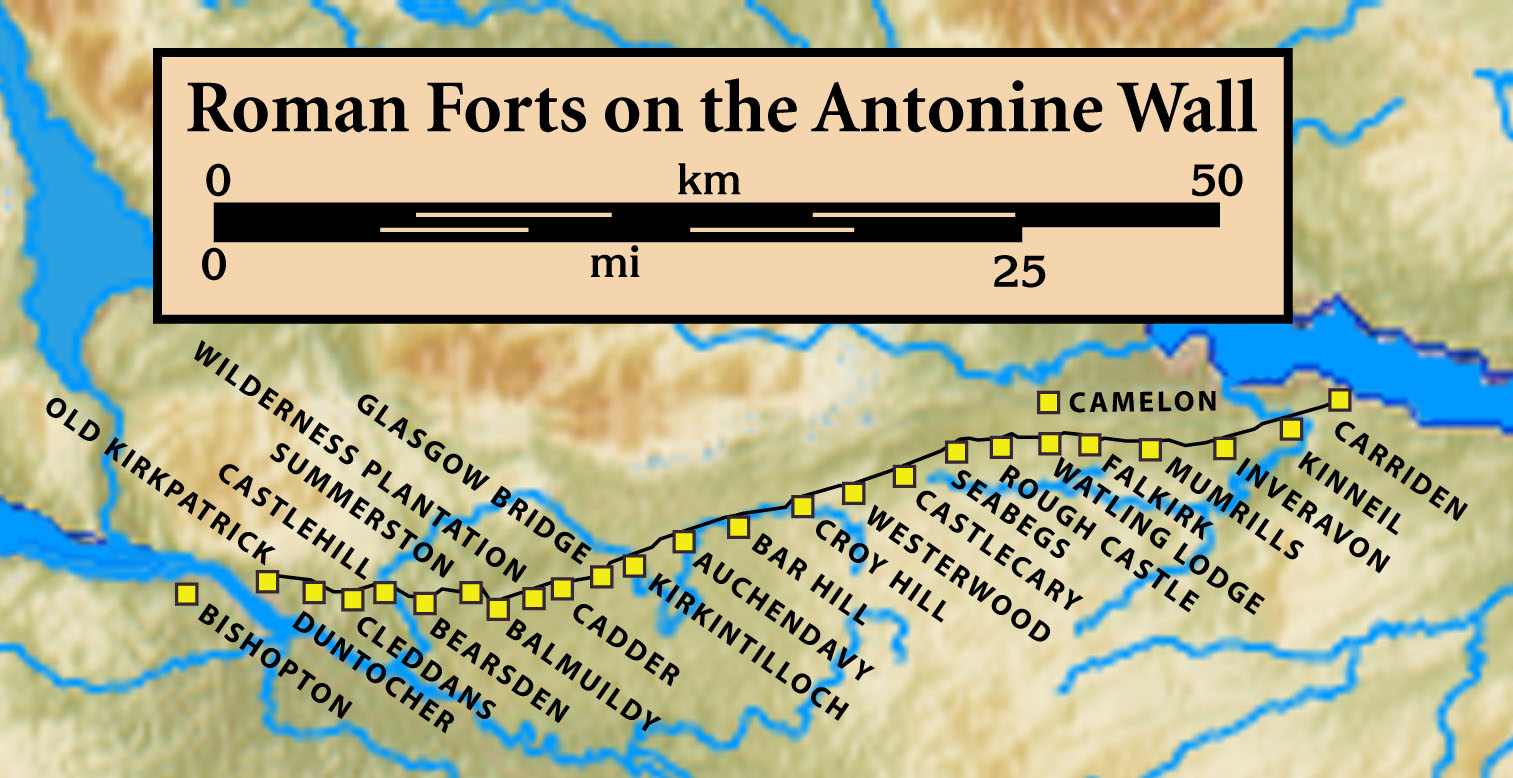
Forts and Fortlets associated with the Antonine Wall from west to east: Bishopton, Old Kilpatrick, Duntocher, Cleddans, Castlehill, Bearsden, Summerston, Balmuildy, Wilderness Plantation, Cadder, Glasgow Bridge, Kirkintilloch, Auchendavy, Bar Hill, Croy Hill, Westerwood, Castlecary, Seabegs, Rough Castle, Camelon, Watling Lodge, Falkirk, Mumrills, Inveravon, Kinneil, Carriden

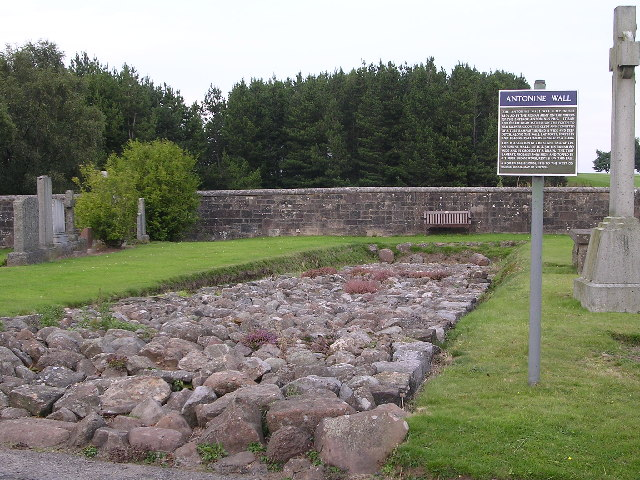
Stone foundation of the Antonine Wall in New Kilpatrick Cemetery

The first known settlement on the site of present-day Bearsden was a 2 1/2-acre (1-hectare) Roman fort in the second century AD. Between 142 and 144 AD, under Emperor Antoninus Pius, the Romans built a stone and turf fortification, called the Antonine Wall, between the Firth of Clyde and the Firth of Forth. They also built the Military Way, a road that ran parallel, to the south of the wall. The fort was positioned at the intersection of the Military Way, and the north–south road between Glasgow and Loch Lomond. A video reconstruction of the site has been produced. In 164 AD, after only 20 years, the Romans withdrew to Hadrian's Wall.

Little of the fort remains today. However, close to the fort was a Roman bath-house, built in approximately 142–143 AD. The bath-house's remains were discovered by builders digging foundations for a housing development in 1973. The site was donated to the nation, and today the remains lie, well-preserved, 150 metres (160 yd) from the town centre. Two further stretches of the Antonine Wall's stone base can be seen in the New Kilpatrick Cemetery on Boclair Road.

=== Pre-industrial ===
Prior to 1649, the area formed part of a larger parish called Kilpatrick. One part was called West, or Old Kilpatrick, and covered Dumbarton and areas of west Dunbartonshire, such as Clydebank. The remaining part was named East or New Kilpatrick, covering a much greater area than Bearsden, from the River Clyde at Whiteinch and Yoker to Duntocher, Strathblane and Baldernock. Modern Bearsden began in an agricultural area as a small hamlet called New Kirk (or perhaps Chapelton) close to New Kilpatrick Parish Church, which was first built in 1649. Close landmarks included Canniesburn Toll, and a water mill at Garscube. The present-day church was built in 1807.

The size and style of the community prior to urbanisation is recorded in Rambles Round Glasgow, first published in 1854. The author describes a route from Maryhill, crossing the River Kelvin at Garscube Mill to Canniesburn. At that point, the route takes the road to Drymen, rather than the alternative to Milngavie. Of particular note are the woods and gardens surrounding the fine houses of Killermont and Garscube, which are contrasted with a small shop at Canniesburn with apparently nothing left for sale. The kirk-toun (modern Bearsden Cross) is described as consisting of about a dozen cottages of idyllic rural beauty, isolated from the noise and dirt of Glasgow. The account also includes one of the earliest references to "Bear's Den", and although the location is not clear, a traditional belief is recorded that it was a Roman burial site.

=== Modern ===
The New Kirk settlement grew from the middle of the nineteenth century when Glaswegian businessmen built houses at a commutable distance from the city. In 1863, the Glasgow and Milngavie Junction Railway opened, with a station near New Kirk called Bearsden. This was soon adopted as the name of the community. The opening of the railway led to considerable development of Bearsden, with many large Victorian houses built in what is now known as Old Bearsden Conservation Area.

The Glasgow Reformatory for Girls at East Chapelton (also known as East Chapelton Home and Hillfoot Residential School) moved from Rottenrow to Bearsden in the late 1860s. Managed by Glasgow Corporation, the countryside location moved the girls away from any malign influences to be found in the city and allowed the institution to be self-supporting with livestock and a vegetable garden. The girls washed their own clothes and those of local residents in the Reformatory's large laundry. In addition to girls who had fallen foul of the courts, others with problems such as malnourishment and learning difficulties were also housed at Chapelton. In 1949, around 360 girls passed through the school annually and were taken to New Kilpatrick Parish church on Sundays. The school closed in the early 1970s and after a brief period as a hall of residence for the Nautical College, the building was demolished to make way for a shopping centre with a Fine Fare supermarket (later replaced by Asda).

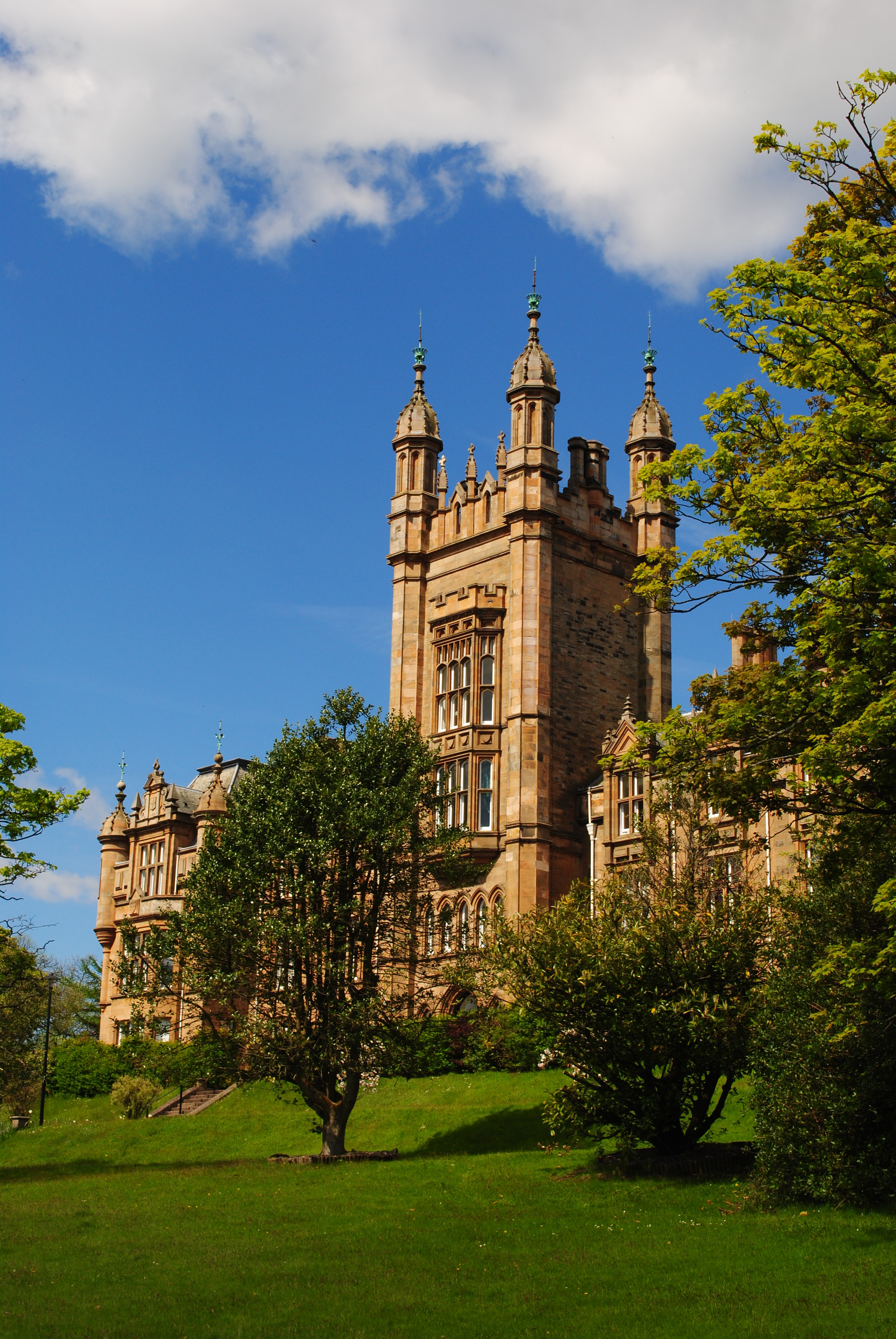
Former Schaw Convalescent Home, Bearsden, built 1895

Buchanan Retreat was built in 1890 by the Buchanan sisters of Bellfield, near Kilmarnock, in Ayrshire. It was taken over by Bearsden Burgh in 1962 and, known as Boclair House, used as council offices (pictured below under Administration). Latterly used by East Dunbartonshire council, it was placed on the market in 2012 following council cost-cutting measures and staff redistribution. In 2016 the building opened as Boclair House Hotel, a hotel, wedding venue, and restaurant, which has since won several awards. The Schaw Home (pictured) was built in 1895 by Miss Marjory Shanks Schaw in memory of her brother and gifted to Glasgow Royal Infirmary. The building has now been split into private residential apartments.

In 1906, many buildings were built at Bearsden Cross by Mathew Henderson (he also tried, unsuccessfully, to develop another commuter suburb at Drumchapel). Westerton Garden suburb was built around 1913 and is also now a conservation area near Westerton station. Near this is the site of the former Canniesburn Hospital, which has many Art Deco buildings and where pioneering plastic surgery was performed, notably on the Boy David who was featured on many television programmes and was adopted by one of the doctors there. The hospital site has now been developed into flats, but much of the character has been retained and copied. A further station in Bearsden is at Hillfoot. Bearsden continued to expand in the twentieth century as residents built large independently designed villas, estates of bungalows, and other types of houses. Few sites are now left unoccupied.

In 1958, Bearsden became a Burgh. Then, in 1975, it became part of Bearsden & Milngavie District Council. Since 1996, it has been the largest of the five major towns of East Dunbartonshire Council.

=== Toponymy ===
Bearsden was first known as Kirktoun(e) or New/Easter Kilpatrick village, all of which relate to the parish church situated in the centre of the town. There is no evidence that the village itself (rather than the parish) was ever called "New Kilpatrick" by locals (by the mid 19th century the houses near to the church had come to be called New Kirk). Nevertheless, the name appears over the village on old maps (see image below) and the town's official Gaelic name is Cille Phàdraig Ùr. The Scots language records of the Parliament of Scotland prior to the Acts of Union 1707 use the names Easter Kirkpatrick and Eister Kilpatrick for the parish.

The current name Bearsden originated from the railway station built in 1863, but the origin of the name itself is unresolved. The station was named after a house near the station site (to avoid confusion with Old Kilpatrick station), but it was recorded as a name for the immediate area before that time. The meaning behind the name "Bearsden" may be one of the following:

- A nickname given to the area of the Manse Burn by a Garscube heir
- It relates to the barley (bear) that grew in the glen (dene)
- It could be related to Gaelic, meaning "entrenchments of the fort"
- The most common explanation is that the sons of a local laird once kept a pet bear in a den there, but there is no evidence to support this.

To quote James McCardel, the wisest course is frankly to admit that the derivation [of the name of Bearsden] is unknown.

=== Coat of arms ===
Sources of features on the Bearsden Burgh coat of arms
Campbell of Succoth (Garscube)

Colquhoun of Garscadden and Killermont

House of Lennox

The Lord Lyon King of Arms granted a coat of arms to the Burgh of Bearsden on 29 June 1959. Since 1975, details have been incorporated into the arms of subsequent local administrative bodies (Bearsden and Milngavie, then East Dunbartonshire). The arms feature the following details:

- The mural coronet shows that these arms belong to a municipal police burgh in Scotland.
- The field (or shield background) is gold, a colour taken from the arms of the Clan Campbell of Succoth (Garscube Estate). The engrailed black diagonal stripe and the buckle are modified from the arms of the Campbell-Colquhouns (of Garscadden and Killermont); representing the three estates upon which much of Bearsden is now built.
- The rose is taken from the arms of Lennox, representing Dunbartonshire.
- The lower portion is an example of canting arms – it represents the name of the town as a rebus, with a bear apparently looking into a den, while muzzled in traditional heraldic style.
- The Scots motto on the Bearsden coat of arms is "Bear the Gree" (a phrase occurring frequently in Scots literature from about 1420, including in Robert Burns' A Man's A Man for A' That) which means 'to hold or win first place'.

== Education ==
There are two secondary schools in the town, Bearsden Academy and Boclair Academy which both have academic performance "well above average". These are fed by seven primary schools within the town (Boclair Academy's fourth feeder primary is located outside Bearsden in Torrance) and a small number of placing requests from other areas. An eighth primary school, St Nicolas’, feeds three Catholic secondary schools outside Bearsden. The High School of Glasgow has a primary school section in the town – this is the result of a merger between the school and the former Drewsteignton Home School, founded in 1922.

| Primary School | Feeds Into | Neighbourhood |
|---|---|---|
| Westerton Primary School | Boclair Academy | Westerton |
| Killermont Primary School | Boclair Academy | Killermont |
| Colquhoun Park Primary School | Boclair Academy | Westerton |
| Baljaffray Primary School | Bearsden Academy | Baljaffray |
| Bearsden Primary School | Bearsden Academy | Town Centre/cross |
| Castlehill Primary School | Bearsden Academy | Castlehill |
| Mosshead Primary School | Bearsden Academy | Mosshead |
| St Nicholas' Primary School | Turnbull High School; John Paul Academy; St Ninian's High School, Kirkintilloch | Baljaffray |

== Demography ==
The expansion of the town of Bearsden, as shown through maps of the area from 1832.

Bearsden is primarily a middle-class commuter suburb. The majority of its housing stock is detached or semi-detached. According to the 2022 census of Scotland, the town comprises roughly 11,000 households with a total population of 28,486. This is an increase from the 2011 census population of 27,237. The population is divided between two East Dunbartonshire council wards: Bearsden North, which has 14,816 residents, and Bearsden South, which has 13,670 residents.

Many of the west of Scotland's most expensive houses are in the Old Bearsden Outstanding Conservation Area. Historically, Bearsden's postcode (G61) was ranked the 7th richest in the UK by a 2005 survey, with an estimated 176 millionaires living there. The area remains highly affluent, with property values continuing to reflect this status. According to recent Rightmove market data, the overall average sold price for a property in Bearsden was £427,914, with detached properties selling for an average of £579,865.

The graphic is a summary of maps of the area since 1832. These demonstrate the growth of the town to its current extent from a large number of disconnected dwellings to a large settlement spreading from the New Kirk area. The relative size of houses (and corresponding affluence of households) tends to increase with age, but this is not a strict rule.

== Administration ==
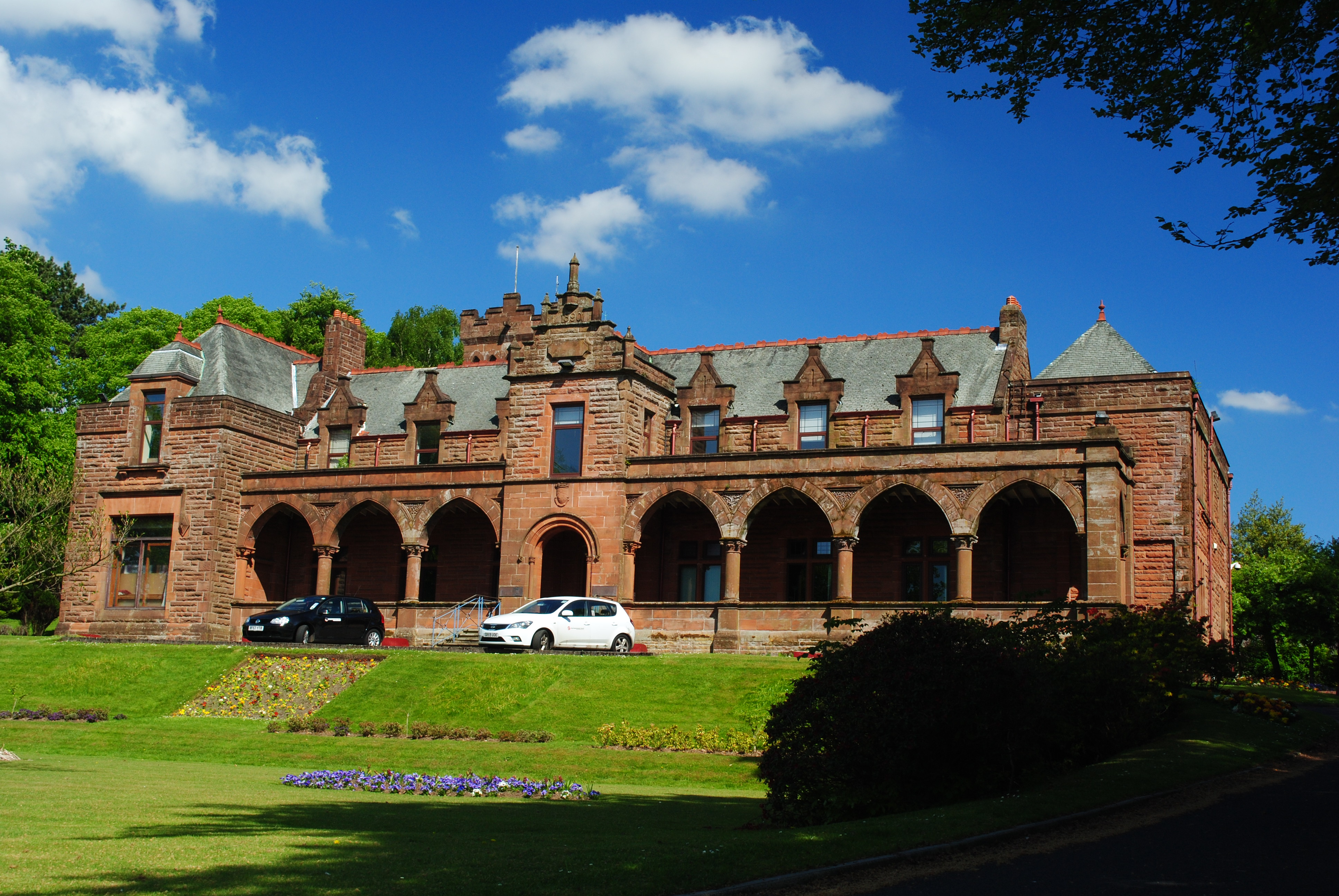
Boclair House, formerly Buchanan Retreat, Bearsden, built 1890. Used by East Dunbartonshire Council's Education Department until 2012, it is now a hotel with housing to the rear.

Bearsden forms two East Dunbartonshire Council wards (there are eight in total), called Bearsden North and Bearsden South. Each Ward has three councillors elected through a single transferable vote system.

Ward 2 – Bearsden North

For representatives, see Results from 5 May 2022 election for Bearsden North

Bearsden North is part of the Clydebank and Milngavie constituency in the Scottish Parliament. The MSP is Marie McNair (SNP); elected on 5 May 2021.

Ward 3 – Bearsden South

For representatives, see Results from 5 May 2022 election for Bearsden South

Bearsden South is part of the Strathkelvin and Bearsden constituency in the Scottish Parliament. The MSP is Rona Mackay (SNP); elected May 2016.

Both constituencies form part of the West of Scotland regional list in the Scottish Parliament. The town is also part of the East Dunbartonshire constituency in the UK Parliament at Westminster. The current MP is Susan Murray (Liberal Democrat)

== Transport links ==
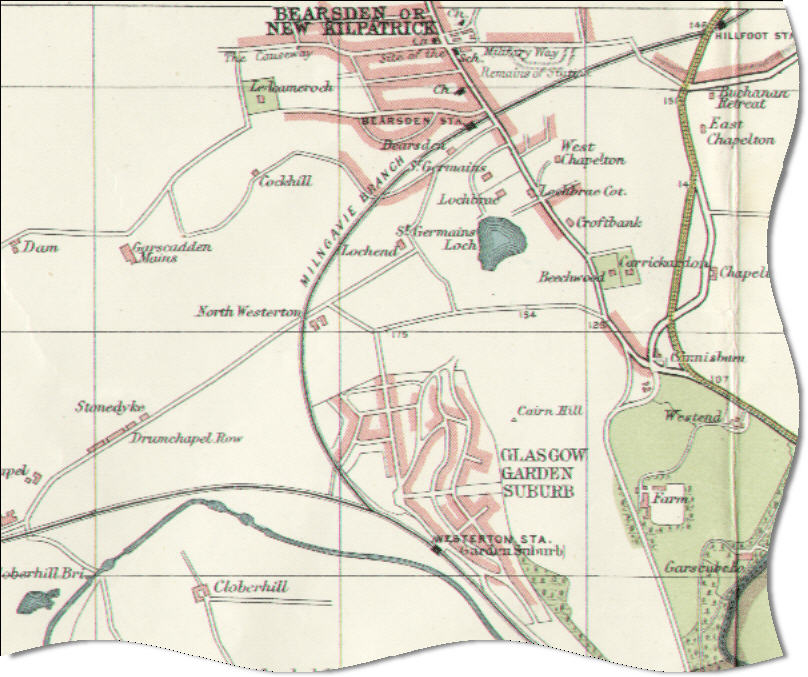
Map of Bearsden in 1923

Bearsden can be accessed by rail from Bearsden, Westerton or Hillfoot stations.

It can also be accessed by road, of which the main routes are:

| Road | Starting point | Ending point | Common names |
|---|---|---|---|
| A739 | Canniesburn Toll | Craigton, Glasgow | Bearsden Road, Switchback Road |
| A809 | Canniesburn Toll | Drymen | Drymen Road, Stockiemuir Road |
| A808 | Bearsden Cross | Kirkintilloch | Roman Road, Boclair Road |
| A81 | Centre of Glasgow | Callander | Milngavie Road, Maryhill Road |

== Neighbourhoods ==
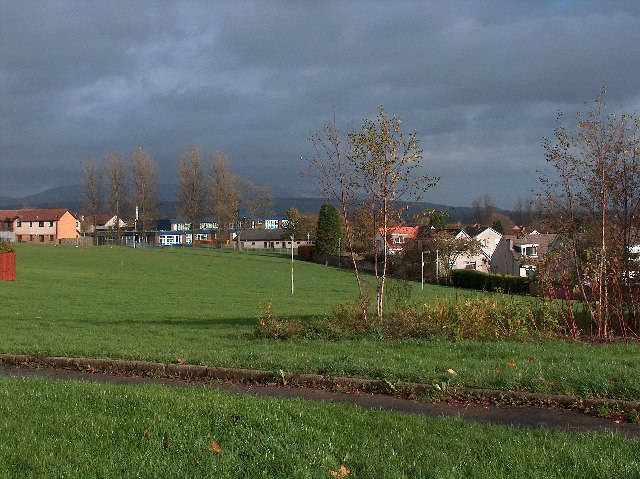
Baljaffray Primary School

Neighbourhoods in Bearsden, like those in many other towns, do not have clear boundaries; where places like Kessington were once a few houses together surrounded by agricultural land, they now merge with other (once distinct) areas, like Killermont. In general terms, however, the neighbourhoods of Bearsden can be described as follows:

- The town centre (also known as Bearsden Cross) is located at the intersection of the A809 (Drymen Road) and A808 (Roman Road). It was formerly known as New Kirk, as can be seen on postcards from the early 20th century. There are a number of shops in the area, representing most retail sectors, including a small supermarket. There are four functioning church buildings (Bearsden Cross Parish Church, All Saints Episcopal Church, New Kilpatrick Parish Church and St. Andrew's Roman Catholic Church) a primary school, and a community hub with library. Bearsden Ski Club and the Roman bath-house (across from which is Bearsden Baptist church and the Scout Hall of the 24th Glasgow Scout Group) lie on the edge the town centre. The former Bearsden North Church is a listed building, but is currently unused and is awaiting redevelopment proposals.
- Old Bearsden describes the area in Central / West Bearsden which are some of the most desirable residential areas of the country with sizeable sandstone villas. In 1855, John Campbell Colquhoun (a director of the Glasgow & Milngavie Junction Railway Company) drew up plans for housebuilding near Bearsden Station. Ledcameroch Road and Crescent were part of this plan, but the remainder was never completed as intended. Three of the largest houses, (Ledcameroch, St Germains and Lochbrae) were demolished and redeveloped between 1977 & 1985. The term now generally includes Bearsden Cross.
- Westerton is to the Southwest of the town, particularly the conservation area of 1920s buildings, shops, library and church around Maxwell Avenue, having clear boundaries with Drumchapel, Knightswood and Netherton in Glasgow. It has its own train station, Westerton railway station and primary school (Westerton Primary School).
- Castlehill/Courthill and Baljaffray lie to the Northwest of the town, and principally compose of post-1970 developments. The name Castlehill relates back to the presence of a Roman fort along the line of the Antonine Wall, although this is no longer visible. Modern Baljaffray was built in two phases; the residential areas, school and shopping precinct of South Baljaffray in the early 1970s were followed in the 1980s by further housing North Baljaffray – the two areas are divided by Baljaffray Road. Baljaffray has had a primary school since 1974, the logo of which represents a mine wheel, reflecting the coal-mining history of the area until the closure of the workings in 1910.
- Mosshead lies to the North of the town, having a boundary with Milngavie.
- Hillfoot lies to the East of the town centre, and was once a large house, demolished and built on in the first half of the 20th century.
- Kessington and Killermont cover the remainder of the East of Bearsden, a rough dividing line between the two being from Kessington Hall to Boclair Academy.
- Chapelton is shown on some of the oldest maps of the area. Originally just a few houses on Drymen Road south of Bearsden Cross, the area now covers the area between Milngavie Road, Drymen Road and Roman Road.
- To the South and West of Chapelton is Canniesburn, formerly the site of a tollhouse and smithy, now a huge roundabout. Canniesburn Hospital was partly demolished after its closure in 2001 and premium residences now stand on the site.

== Notable people ==
=== Academia and arts ===
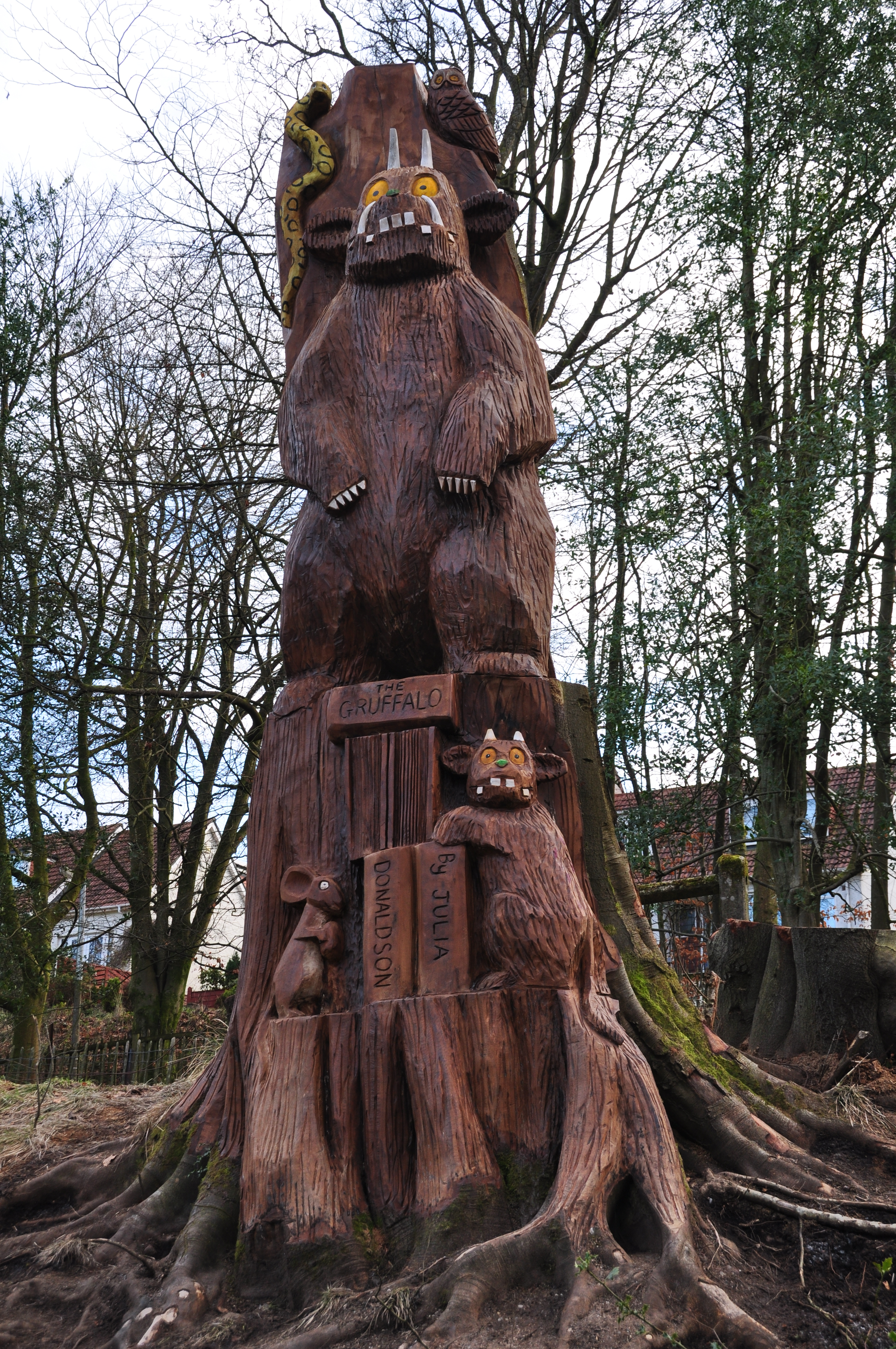
Gruffalo Sculpture, Kilmardinny Loch, Bearsden

- Mea Allan, journalist, novelist and biographer
- Julia Donaldson, author of The Gruffalo and other children's books, lived in the town. Gruffalo sculptures have been placed around Kilmardinny Loch (see photo).
- Jessie M. King, Scottish painter and member of the Glasgow Girls, was born in the New Kilpatrick manse as the daughter of the minister
- Joan Eardley, Scottish artist noted for her portraiture of street children in Glasgow and for her landscapes of the fishing village of Catterline and surroundings on the North-East coast of Scotland.
- Edwin Morgan, The Scots Makar and Poet Laureate, was resident in Bearsden for a couple of years, and featured the town in some of his works (e.g. the sonnet "Carboniferous")
- David J. Thouless, 2016 winner of the Nobel Prize in Physics
- Prof Robert Wilson Dron, geologist and coal-mining expert lived at Utica on Thorn Drive in Bearsden

=== Charity, commerce and politics ===
- Norman Macfarlane, Baron Macfarlane of Bearsden, Scottish industrialist and Conservative member of the House of Lords
- Alec J. Spalding (9 August 1923 – 2 October 2007), Scout Leader of the 24th Glasgow (Bearsden) Scout Group for over 50 years, recipient of the Silver Wolf

=== Sport ===
- Stephanie Davis (runner), marathon runner. Represented Great Britain at the 2020 Summer Olympics.
- Katherine Grainger, Olympic Gold Medalist and Britain's most successful female rower was Girl's Captain at Bearsden Academy
- Alex McLeish, defender for Aberdeen, manager of Hibernian, Rangers and Scotland
- Alan McManus, snooker player
- David Moyes, Everton manager, and former manager of Manchester United, West Ham United, Sunderland and Real Sociedad.
- Beth Potter, triathlete. Olympic Bronze Medalist at the 2024 Summer Olympics, world triathlon champion (2023),
- Kieran McAnespie, football manager and former player. In the Premier League for Fulham FC and Scottish Premier League for St Johnstone and Hearts. McAnespie was also manager of Clydebank FC

=== Entertainment and journalism ===
- Moyo Akandé (actress), grew up in Bearsden
- Edwyn Collins (musician / former member of Orange Juice)
- Darius Danesh, pop singer
- Mark Easton, journalist
- Alex Kapranos, vocalist with the Glaswegian band Franz Ferdinand
- Moultrie Kelsall, character actor (b. 1901, d.1980)
- Mark Knopfler, front-man and co-founder of Dire Straits, attended Bearsden Primary School for two years before his family moved to England.
- Johnny McElhone, founder member, bass guitarist and songwriter for Texas, a blues / rock band
- Alan MacNaughtan, actor (b. 1920, d. 2002)
- Aasmah Mir, radio presenter
- Moira Shearer, dancer, actress (The Red Shoes, Tales of Hoffmann, etc.) and wife of Ludovic Kennedy was educated at Bearsden Academy

== Leisure activities ==
=== Football ===
Baljaffray Football Club, established 1996, is a grassroots football club and has teams competing in EDSSA and CSFA up to the age of 11/12 and competitive football thereafter in the CSFA and PJ&DYF leagues. Baljaffray also has an amateur team who play in the Glasgow & District AFL.

The Bearsden Amateur Football Club was constituted in 1890 and its founders were drawn mainly from the employees of the staging post, originally situated at Bearsden Cross. Their first ground was in Drymen road, now the site of the public hall and All Saints church and when the ground was re-developed the club moved on to Station Road where they played until the club disbanded on the outbreak of war in 1914. In 1919 the club reformed and played for the first time on their present ground at Thorn Park. The club won the Scottish Amateur Cup in 1961–62, beating Pencaitland 1–0 at Hampden Park. They participate in the Caledonian Amateur Football League and other cup competitions.

Westerton United (1997) is another local grassroots football team.

=== Golf ===
Windyhill Golf Club (founded 1908), West of Baljaffray, has an 18-hole course laid out by James Braid, who subsequently modified Glasgow Golf Club's Killermont course 16 years later. The course has views of the River Clyde, Campsie Fells and Kilpatrick Hills.

The Glasgow Golf Club is one of the world's oldest, founded in 1787. In 1904 the club moved premises to Killermont House and its surrounding estate, built in 1805 for the Campbell-Colquhoun family. The club is unusual in having a links course (at Gailes, near Irvine) in addition to its home course.

Bearsden Golf Club, to the East of Bearsden Cross, has a nine-hole course, with seven alternative greens, thus enabling a full round to be played. Its layout has not changed significantly from its foundation in 1891.

Douglas Park Golf Club, Hillfoot, has a full course and can trace its history back to 1897, although the current layout dates from 1972.

=== Highland Games ===
Highland Games for Bearsden and Milngavie are held annually at the West of Scotland Rugby Ground.

=== Skiing ===
Bearsden Ski Club was formed circa 1964 by a small band of enthusiasts. The club has a membership of about 1200 skiers, boarders and social members. The club facilities include the Main alpine slope, two nursery slopes, a freestyle slope and a club house, it also currently undergoing further renovation. It provides a wide range of activities from skiing cross-country on one of their trips to tubing on the freestyle slope.

=== Chess ===
Bearsden have a competitive chess club, with one team from the club winning the Glasgow Division 1 League outright in 2010.

=== Scouting and girlguiding ===
There are two Scout Groups in Bearsden. The 24th Glasgow (Bearsden) Scout Group, was formed in January 1908 and is one of the largest Groups in the UK with four Beaver Colonies, four Cub Packs, three Scout Troops and an Explorer Unit, as well as providing a meeting place for Scout Network. There is a published history of the group. The group is known for its many international camps, including a biennial visit to the Kandersteg International Scout Centre since 1949 and currently has over 600 members. The 183rd Glasgow Scout Group, was formed in 1947 by the Home Guard and has two Beaver Colonies, two Cub Packs, one Scout Troop and an Explorer Unit. It currently has over 130 members. Like the 24th, it goes on many international camps during the summer holidays to Germany, Canada, Belgium, and more recently, Croatia. Both Groups are part of the Clyde Region of the Scout Association. Girlguiding is also active in Bearsden, with units based at Killermont Parish Church and at the Guide Hut in Pendicle Road. The local units are members of the Girlguiding Dunbartonshire.

=== Boys' Brigade ===
Bearsden has three Boys' Brigade Companies. The 1st Bearsden Company of the Boys' Brigade, Founded in 1898. The company has three sections – Anchor Boys, Junior Section and Company Section. The 2nd Bearsden Company of the Boys' Brigade, attached to the Westerton Parish Church which was established in 1957, but the BB Company can trace its history back to before that date. The 3rd Bearsden Company of the Boys' Brigade is attached to the Killermont Parish Church.
