= Balmore railway station =

Disused railway station in Scotland

Coordinates: 55.9348°N 4.2415°W

Balmore
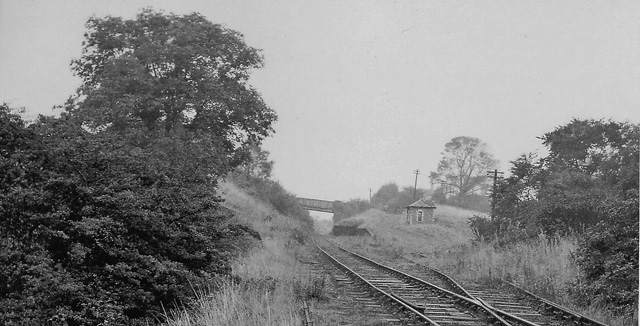
- Balmore railway station in 1961

General information
- Location: East Dunbartonshire; Scotland
- Grid reference: NS600735
- Platforms: 1

Other information
- Status: Disused

History
- Pre-grouping: North British Railway
- Post-grouping: London and North Eastern Railway

Key dates
- 1 October 1879: Station opens
- 2 April 1951: Station closed
- 31 July 1961: Line closed to freight
Location

Balmore railway station was opened in 1879 on the Kelvin Valley Railway and served the coal mining area, farms and the village of Balmore in East Dunbartonshire until 1951 for passengers, and to freight on 31 July 1961.

== History ==
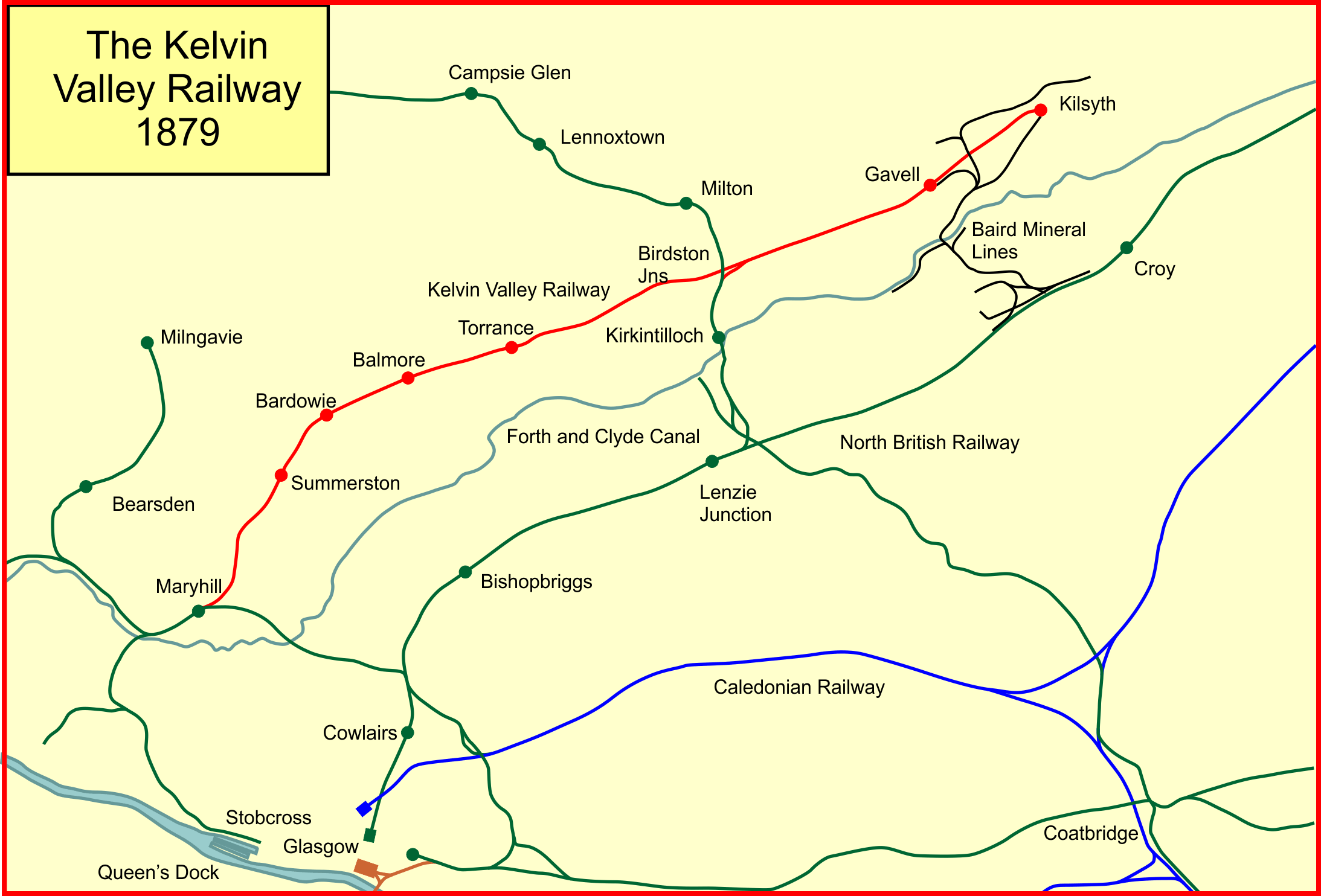
System map of the Kelvin Valley Railway

Opened by the North British Railway, it became part of the London and North Eastern Railway during the Grouping of 1923. The line passed to the Scottish Region of British Railways upon nationalisation in 1948 who then officially closed Balmore in 1951. The line suffered greatly from competition by bus services although the station was located conveniently near to the small village.

In 1956 the Torrance to Kelvin Valley East Junction closed and the surviving section of the west part of the line was utilised for drivers being trained to use DMU's. In 1959 the Torrance to Balmore closed. In 1960 an SLS enthusiasts' railtour ran on the line, hauled by the preserved locomotive 'Glen Douglas'.

== Infrastructure ==
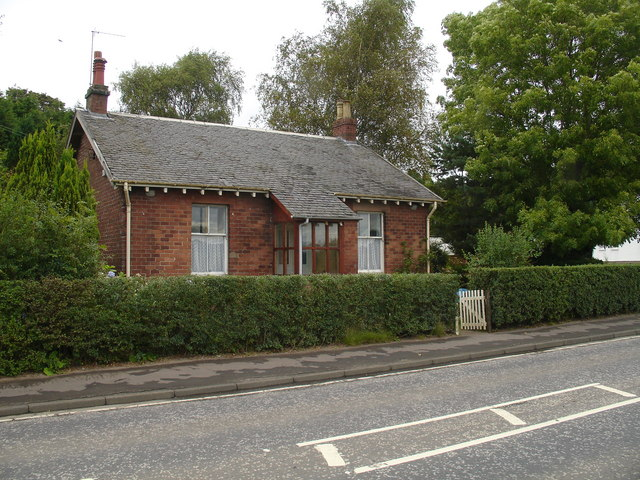
The old station house

The platform and wooden station building with its ticket office, waiting room, canopy, etc. stood on the northern side of this single track line with two sidings on the southern side, a second added circa 1900, running to the east with a short loading dock and worked from the west with a brick built weighing machine house and a lineman's hut. The main station building stood at the western end of the platform. An overbridge stood to the east with steps down leading to a path to the station buildings.

The name 'Balmore' was cut into the grass on the side of the south facing embankment. To the west a bridge carried the line over the road. A stationmaster's house stood close to the road. In 1958 the station is no longer shown, however the siding remains and to the east a mineral line diverges off to the Balmore Colliery mine, lying below Bargeny Hill, that closed in 1960.

Preceding station	Historical railways	Following station
Bardowie	North British Railway; Kelvin Valley Railway	Torrance

== The site today ==
The stationmaster's house remains as a private dwelling however the station and railway bridge have been demolished.
