= Bardowie railway station =

Disused railway station in Scotland

Coordinates: 55.9294°N 4.2632°W

Bardowie
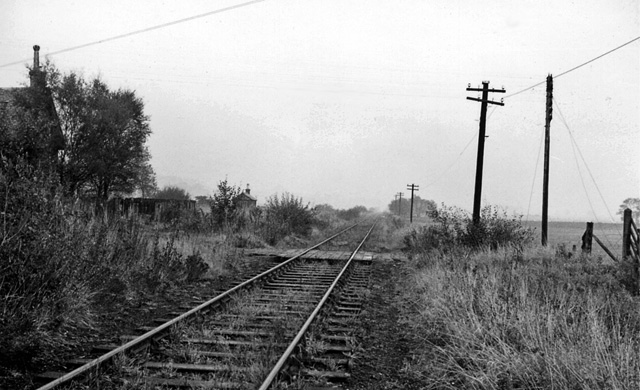
- Site of Bardowie railway station

General information
- Location: East Dunbartonshire; Scotland
- Grid reference: NS586730
- Platforms: 1

Other information
- Status: Disused

History
- Pre-grouping: North British Railway
- Post-grouping: London and North Eastern Railway

Key dates
- 1 June 1905: Station opens
- 20 July 1931: Station closed
- 31 July 1961: Line closed to freight

Bardowie railway station was opened in 1905 on the Kelvin Valley Railway, later than most of the other stations which had opened with the line itself in 1879. It served the hamlet of Bardowie and the coal mining area, farms, etc. in East Dunbartonshire until 1931 for passengers and to freight on 31 July 1961.

== History ==
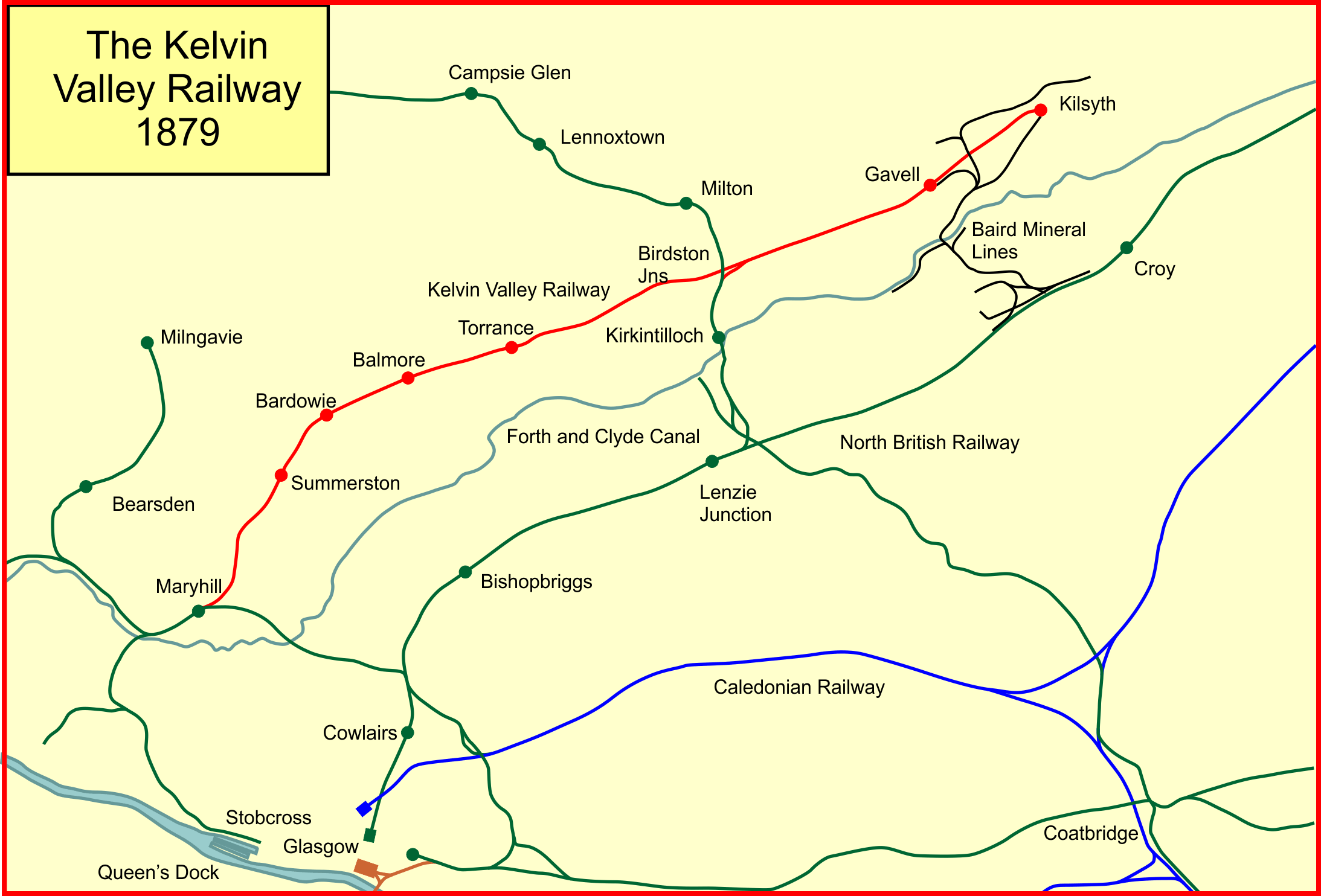
System map of the Kelvin Valley Railway

Opened by the North British Railway, it became part of the London and North Eastern Railway during the Grouping of 1923. The line passed to the Scottish Region of British Railways upon nationalisation. Another source gives the opening date as 1905. Bardowie had coal mining waste tips or bings lying to the north of the station. The line remained open to passengers until 1951. In 1959 the line east of Torrance closed. 1961 was the closure date for goods and mineral freight traffic.

It was intended to build around 500 houses in the locality as indicated by the functionally oversized width of Station Road and the orientation of ‘Beechwood’ house on Balmore Road and 1 Station Road at the proposed main entrance to the estate. A large and actively used mining waste disposal bing detracted from the rural setting and the housing that the station was built to serve were never built explaining the early 1931 closure date of Bardowie station. Bardowie Loch and castle lie nearby.

Closure of the Kelvin Valley line to passengers was on 20 July 1951, but it remained as a through route until 1956; goods traffic ceased on 1 May 1952. The track was still in situ in 1961.

== Infrastructure ==
The single platform and station building with its ticket office, waiting room, canopy, etc. stood on the northern side of this single track line with sidings and cross over sidings on the northern side serving the waste disposal areas on either side of Station Road, etc. A weighing machine house and a stationmaster's house were present. A signal box is shown at the eastern end of the station. The main station building stood at the eastern end of the platform. The 1957 OS map shows a passing loop just to the east of the old station on the single track line with all the trackwork otherwise lifted from the spoil bings, etc.

Preceding station	Historical railways	Following station
Balmore	North British Railway; Kelvin Valley Railway	Summerston

== The site today ==
The stationmaster's house survives as a private dwelling however the station and a mound represents the old platform site.
