= Balmore =

Coordinates: 55°56′04″N 4°14′22″W

Balmore: Scottish Gaelic: Baile Mòr
- Location within East Dunbartonshire
- Population: 200
- OS grid reference: NS6073
- Council area: East Dunbartonshire
- Lieutenancy area: Dunbartonshire
- Country: Scotland
- Sovereign state: United Kingdom
- Post town: GLASGOW
- Postcode district: G64
- Dialling code: 01360
- Police: Scotland
- Fire: Scottish
- Ambulance: Scottish
- UK Parliament: East Dunbartonshire
- Scottish Parliament: Strathkelvin and Bearsden

Balmore (from the Scottish Gaelic "Baile Mòr" meaning a large settlement) is a small village formerly in the county of Stirlingshire, but now lies in East Dunbartonshire, Scotland, located 1 km west of Torrance and 5 km east of Milngavie.

To the south of Balmore lies The Balmore Haughs and the River Kelvin, which flows east–west before turning south and joining the River Clyde. To the south of the River Kelvin and north of the Forth & Clyde Canal lie several Imperial Roman archaeological sites. The remains of part of the Antonine Wall run east–west, and along it two Roman forts, one Roman fortlet and a Roman camp can all be found within 2 km of Balmore.

Balmore appears on The Coal Authority's gazetteer of places where a Coal Mining Search is required in regard to property transactions.

Balmore was part of the vast earldom of the Barony of Mugdock. Was appointed barony in 27 December 1253 by Alexander III of Scotland the first Baron was Patrick of Graham. In 1478 the title passed to William Graham, member of a noble family coming from Verre, France. The title was owned by the family of de Verre until 1823 when James de Graham twelfth Baron of Mugdock, ceded the title to John MacAdam. The ancestors of Mr. MacAdam is Hamilton; the property remained at the Hamilton family until 2015, when August MacAdam of Hamilton fifteenth Baron of Mugdock ceded the title to an Italian family Silighini.

The village and area was served by the North British Railway with Balmore railway station located on the Kelvin Valley Railway from 1879 to 1951, complete closure taking place under British Railways in 1961 with the closure of the Balmore Colliery.

== Notable people ==
Notable people connected with Balmore include Magnus Magnusson, the journalist and television presenter who lived nearby until his death, and his daughter Sally.
