= Torrance railway station =

Former railway station in Scotland

Coordinates: 55.9400°N 4.2115°W

Torrance
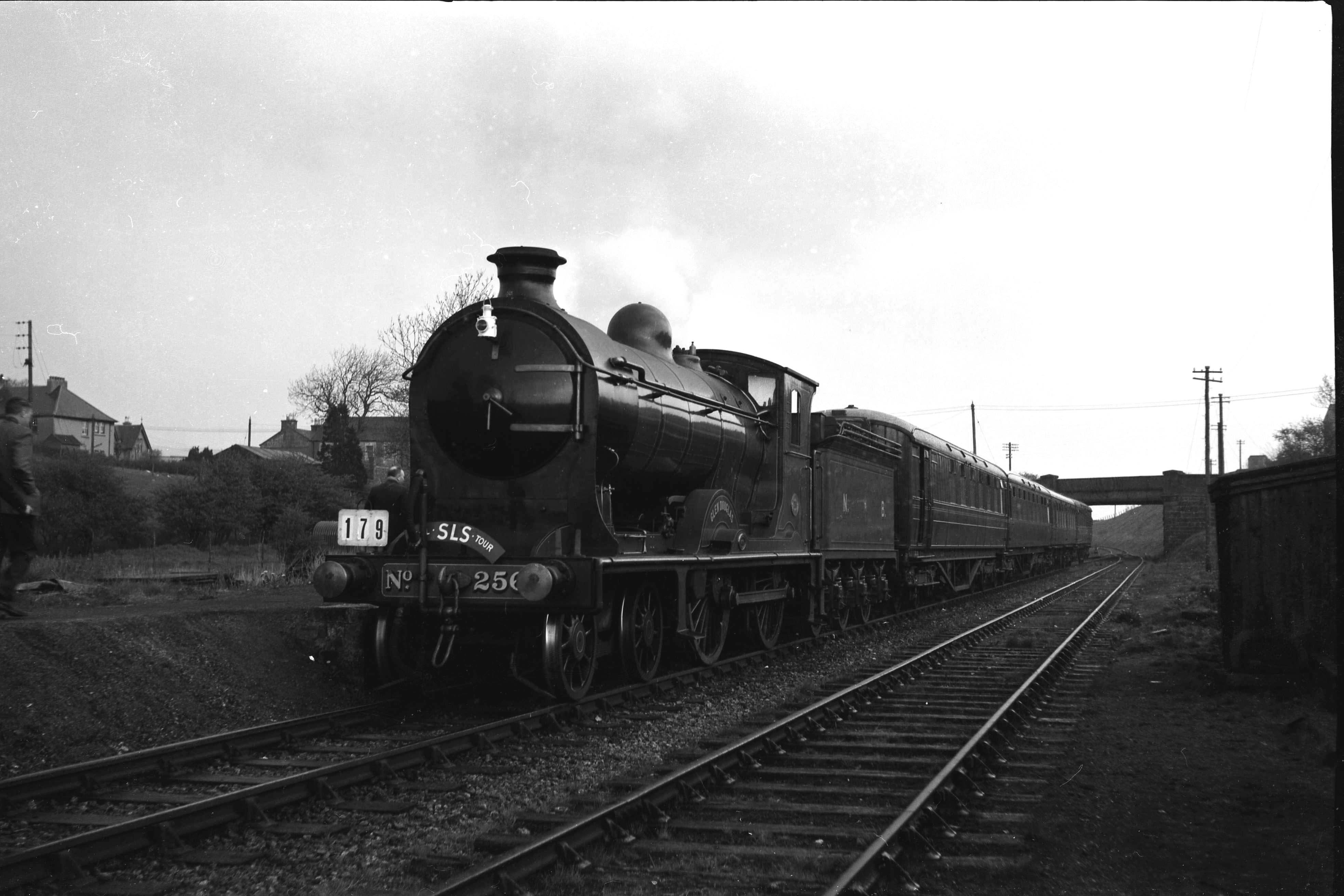
- A rail tour in 1960

General information
- Location: East Dunbartonshire; Scotland
- Grid reference: NS619740
- Platforms: 1

Other information
- Status: Disused

History
- Pre-grouping: North British Railway
- Post-grouping: London and North Eastern Railway

Key dates
- 1 October 1879: Station opens
- 2 April 1951: Station closes
- 1959: Line closed to freight

Torrance railway station was opened in 1879 on the Kelvin Valley Railway and served the area of the village of Torrance in East Dunbartonshire until 1951 for passengers and 1959 for freight.

== History ==
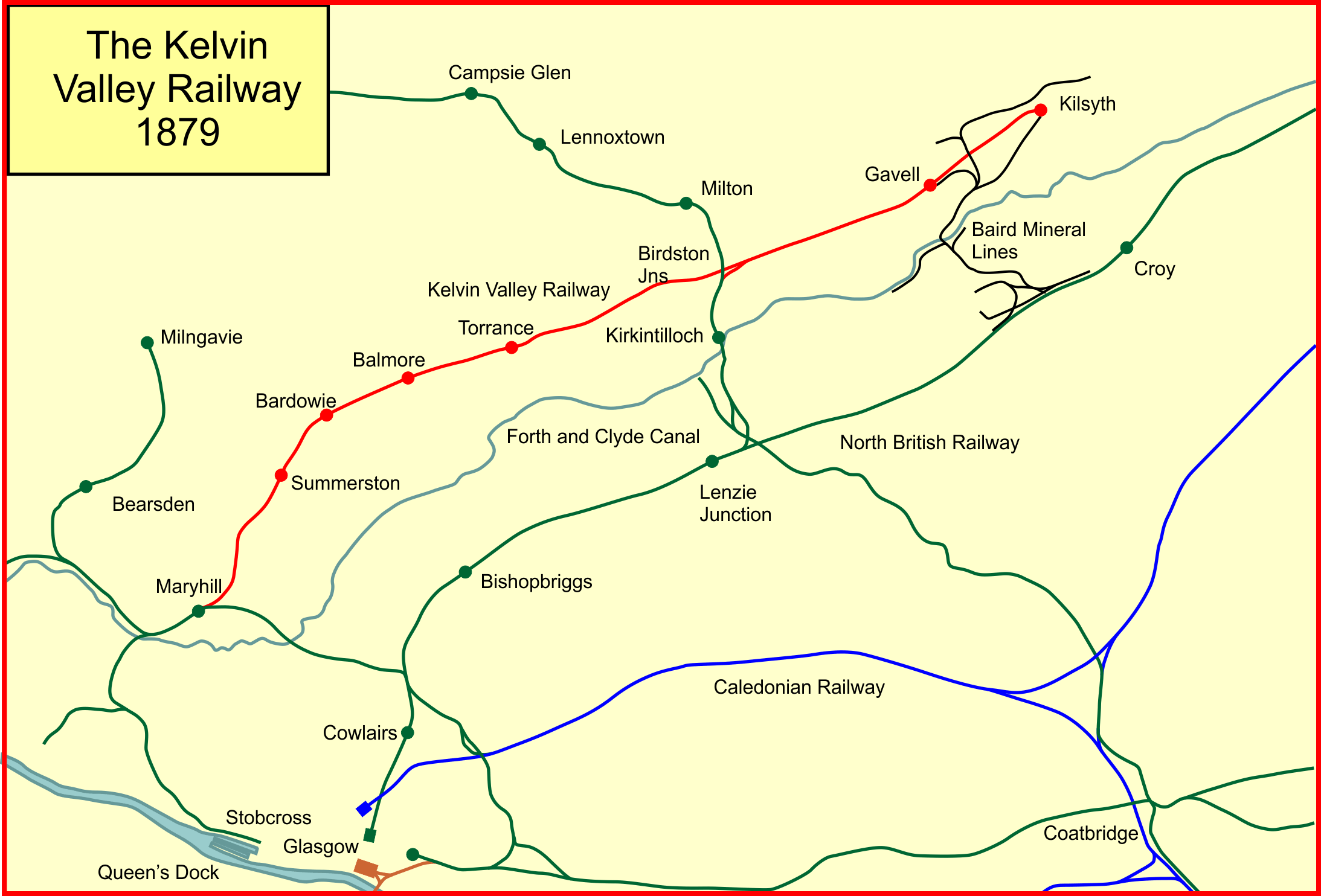
System map of the Kelvin Valley Railway

Opened by the North British Railway, it became part of the London and North Eastern Railway during the Grouping of 1923. The line passed to the Scottish Region of British Railways upon nationalisation in 1948 who then officially closed Torrance in 1951. The line suffered greatly from competition by bus services. The station was however located conveniently in the centre of the village.

In 1956 the Torrance to Kelvin Valley East Junction closed and the surviving section of the west part of the line was utilised for drivers being trained to use DMU's. In 1959 the Torrance to Balmore section was closed. In 1960 an SLS enthusiasts' railtour ran on the line, hauled by the preserved locomotive 'Glen Douglas'.

== Infrastructure ==
The station had a single platform with a small brick built station building that was located on the northern side of the line. In 1896 a passing loop was present together with two sidings, one ending at a loading dock and a signal box. In 1914 the signalbox is shown on the western end of the platform and a weighing machine is indicated in the goods yard and a crane in the goods yard. A road overbridge stood to the east of the station.

Preceding station	Historical railways	Following station
Balmore	North British Railway; Kelvin Valley Railway	Twechar

== The site today ==
In 1981 the site was redeveloped for private housing and the platform was demolished.
