= Torrance, East Dunbartonshire =

Coordinates: 55.940556°N 4.210833°W

Torrance: Scottish Gaelic: An Toran
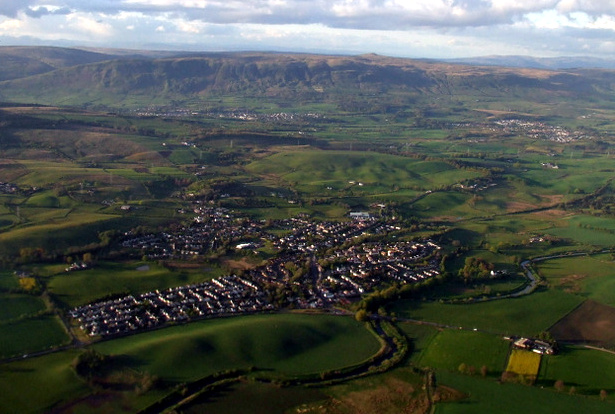
- Torrance with the River Kelvin in the foreground and Milton of Campsie and Lennoxtown in the background.

- Location within East Dunbartonshire
- Population: 2,320 (2020)
- OS grid reference: NS6192974147
- Civil parish: Campsie
- Council area: East Dunbartonshire
- Lieutenancy area: Dunbartonshire
- Country: Scotland
- Sovereign state: United Kingdom
- Post town: GLASGOW
- Postcode district: G64
- Dialling code: 01360
- Police: Scotland
- Fire: Scottish
- Ambulance: Scottish
- UK Parliament: East Dunbartonshire
- Scottish Parliament: Strathkelvin and Bearsden

Torrance is a village in East Dunbartonshire, formerly Stirlingshire, Scotland, located eight miles (thirteen kilometres) north of Glasgow city centre. Torrance used to mainly consist of farmland. The village was once known as a resting place for workers on their way to the Campsie Fells four miles (six kilometres) north. The Forth and Clyde Canal has a wharf nearby at Hungryside, and the A807 runs along its southern edge. The village has an active community charity whose aims are to improve the village facilities.

== History ==
Originally located in the county of Stirlingshire the name Torrance may come from the Gaelic for the place of the "little hillocks".

There are Roman sites close to Torrance with a fort at Cadder and a fortlet at Glasgow Bridge.

The village of Torrance is located in "The Eleven Ploughs of Balgrochan". The "Eleven Ploughlands" are part of the estate of the Grahams of Mugdock, which had been feued in 1630 to local occupiers by the Marquess of Montrose. The feuars, originally holding their land unenclosed, each received an enclosed piece of land in 1735, as was common at the time. The village of Torrance developed some time later.

Although weavers were among the earliest residents of the village, limestone, coal and ironstone extraction also began to emerge as a local industry.

For several years, the canal wharf at Hungryside was Torrance's main connection with the outside world. However, this began to change in 1879 with the opening of Torrance railway station by the Kelvin Valley Railway Company. Before the coming of the railway the population of the area was around 800.

== Community ==
=== Local amenities ===
Torrance offers local amenities to its residents including one hairdresser, one beauty salon and barber, tennis courts, car valeting, mechanics, Scotmid, dentist, chiropodist, bakery, chemist, Chinese takeaway and newsagent and the Torrance Church of Scotland at the foot of School Road and St Dominic's RC Church at the top.

Torrance has three pubs: the Wheatsheaf Inn, the Torrance Inn and the Rambler with another bar in the bowling club.

=== Torrance Primary School ===
The school has around 250 pupils. It has three sport pitches, one of them is rock, another red ash and another which is ash. Primary 7 pupils can transfer onto Boclair Academy in the nearby Bearsden or St Ninians High School in Kirkintilloch.

=== Torrance Initiative ===
Torrance Community Initiative is a registered charity aiming to provide new custom-built community facilities in the village.

The land held in "trust" by Torrance Community Initiative for the benefit of the community is a ten-acre (four-hectare) site. Unfortunately the planning permission granted in 1977 for a multi-use clubhouse for the former land owners - a boys' club, was never brought to fruition. The land was designated as Green Belt in the 1990s, although it forms an intrusion between two parts of the village and most people believed it was simply Greenfield, where legal restrictions on development are less severe. When people learned it was Green Belt, this became an emotive issue and the basis of the campaign against development.

Outline planning for the new community facilities was rejected by East Dunbartonshire council in May 2008. This included the residential development of 20–40 houses to fund for the community facilities on a 9 3/4-acre (3.9-hectare) site held in trust for the community by the Torrance Community Initiative. Reasons for rejection were that the land is designated greenbelt and the council had not yet done a long overdue review of current facilities as identified in the Local Plan.

=== Crime ===
East Dunbartonshire has significantly lower recorded crime rates (40-50% lower for acquisitive and violent crime) than the average in Greater Glasgow and Clyde.

== Administration ==
Torrance is part of Ward 5 (known as Bishopbriggs North and Torrance) within East Dunbartonshire Council and is represented by three local councillors:

- Billy Hendry from the Scottish Conservative and Unionist Party
- Anne McNair from the Scottish National Party
- Una Walker from the Scottish Labour Party

The MSP for Strathkelvin and Bearsden is Fiona McLeod of the Scottish National Party, who was elected on 5 May 2011.

== Notable residents ==
- Voice over artist and actor Lewis MacLeod.
- Musician Tommy Reilly
- George Pirie (artist)
- Norman Pirie, biochemist
- Sally Magnusson, BBC Scotland broadcaster and TV presenter
