= Antermony Loch =

Loch in East Dunbartonshire, Scotland

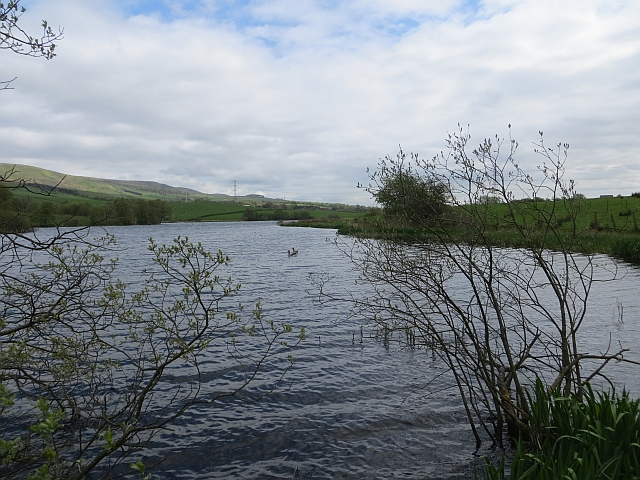
- Antermony Loch from its western shore

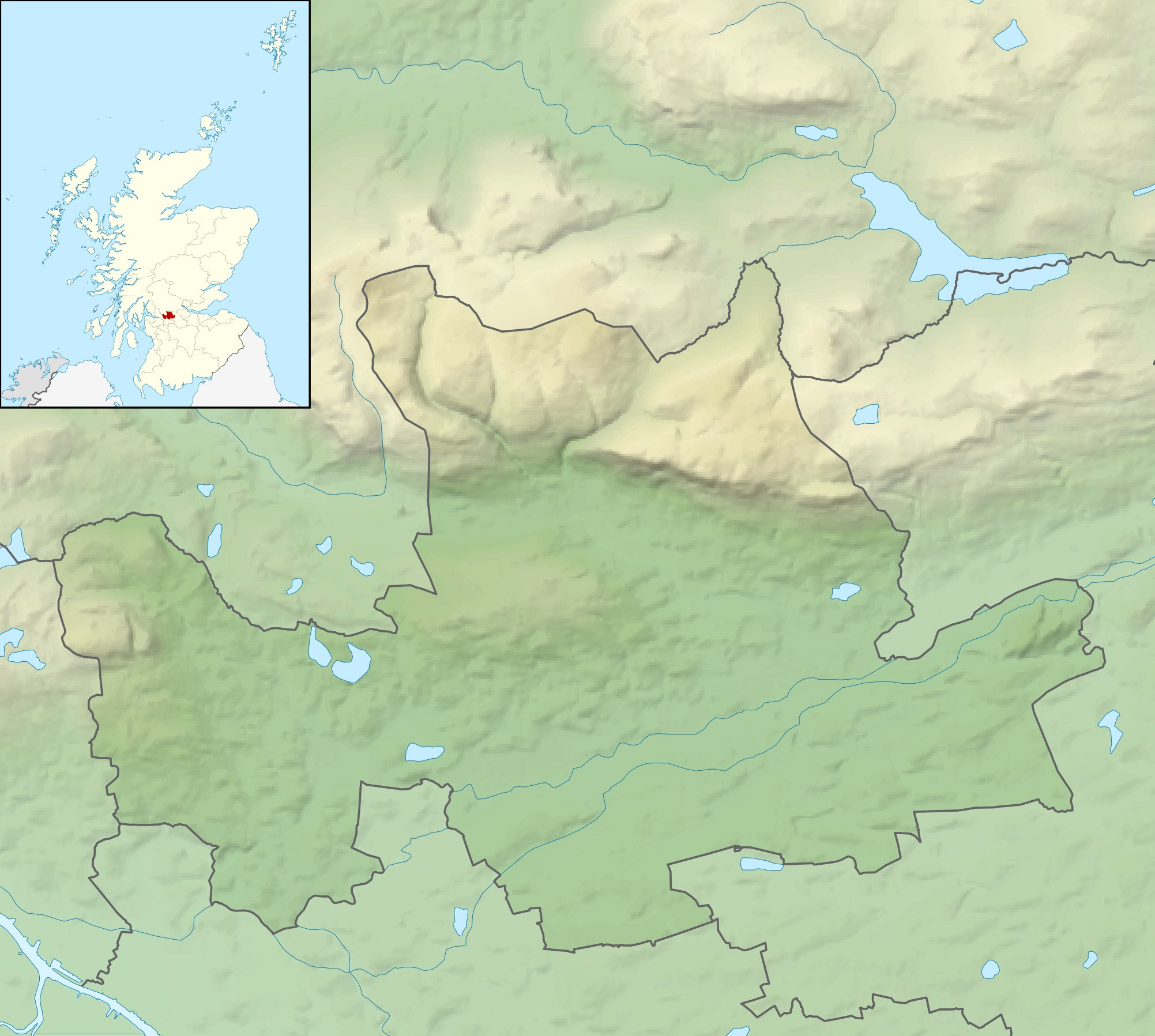
- Location within East Dunbartonshire
- Location: Scottish Lowlands
- Coordinates: 55°57′54″N 4°08′06″W
- Basin countries: Scotland, United Kingdom
- Max. length: 660 m (2,170 ft)
- Max. width: 420 m (1,380 ft)
- Surface elevation: 50 m (160 ft)

Antermony Loch is a lochan (small loch) in East Dunbartonshire, Scotland, at the edge of the village of Auchenreoch.

Its name may be a corruption of the Scottish Gaelic elements uachdar ("summit, top") + monadh ("moorland"), i.e. "Loch of the Moorland Summit". The area was previously referred to as "Achterminnie" as late as the 1900s.

The lochan is mostly surrounded by pasture. Caurnie Angling Club (est. 1925) sits on its northern shore, with a jetty for small fishing boats. The club has held the lease for the lochan since 1943, subject for renewal in 2043.

Antermony Loch is home to several native species of waterfowl, and has a large stock of brown trout.

Accounts from the 18th century record a possible Medieval motte known as "King's Hill" on the lochan's southwest shore. However, recent quarrying has destroyed any archaeological evidence.
