= John Russell Malloch =

Scottish-American entomologist (1875–1963)

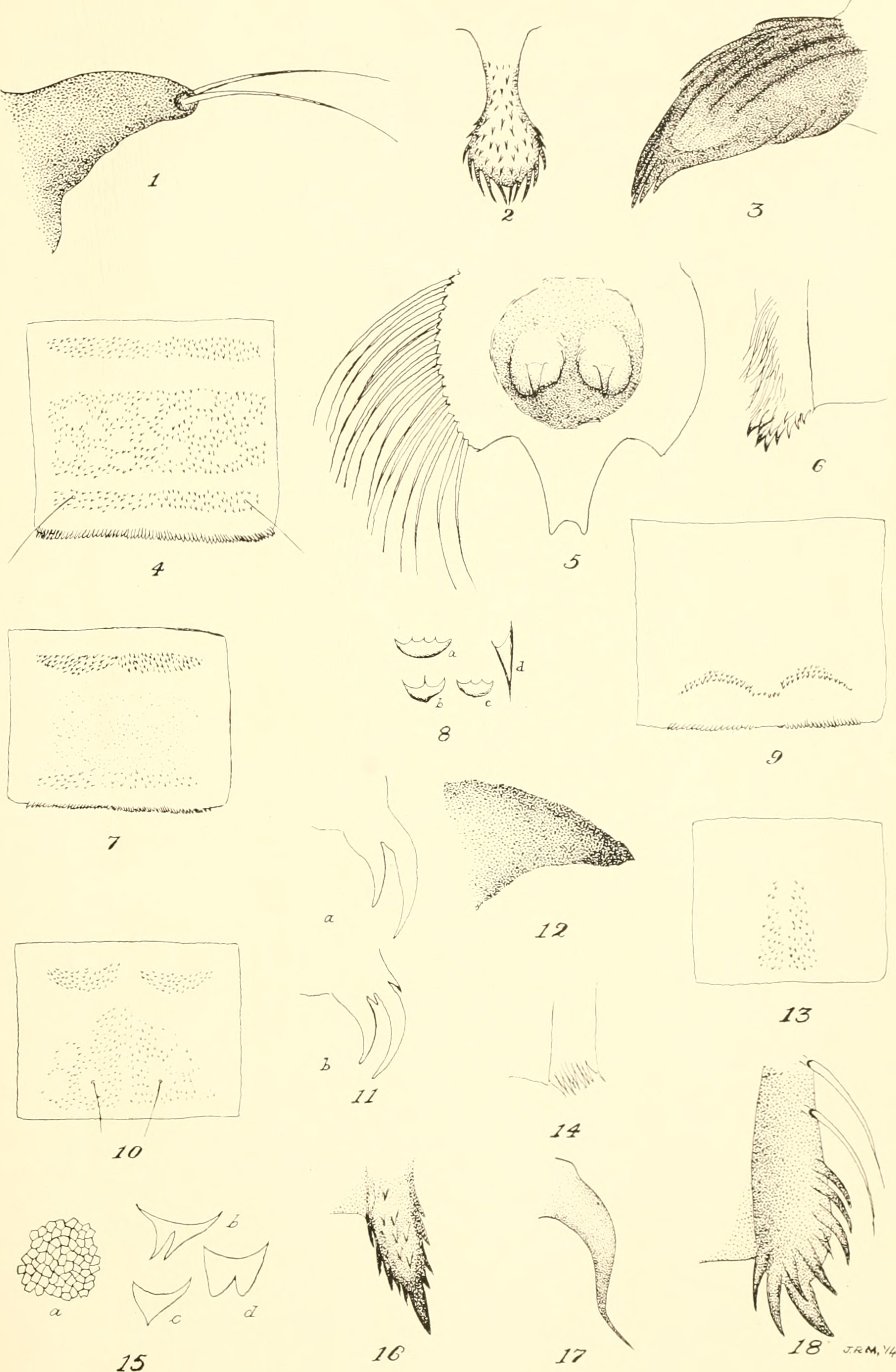
Image from The Chironomidae, or midges, of Illinois, with particular reference to the species occurring in the Illinois River (1915) by John Russell Malloch.

John Russell Malloch (16 November 1875 – 1963) was a Scottish entomologist who specialised in Diptera and Hymenoptera.

Malloch was born at Milton of Campsie in Stirlingshire, Scotland. His widowed father had one son, James Malloch (born 1873) when he married John Russell's mother, Margaret Stirling, on 30 August 1875. He and several others of his family worked at a textile factory in the area, but he spent his spare time collecting insects in the fields. Malloch later described his Scottish household as "a moderate sized Scotch family of eight, three sisters and five brothers." His first published paper (1897) describes a type of migrating butterfly.

In 1903 Malloch sold his extensive collection to the Glasgow Museum. He continued to collect, but began to concentrate on Diptera from that time forward. Before emigrating in 1910, he donated the remainder of his collection (13,000 flies) to the Royal Scottish Museum.

Little is known about Malloch's education. He listed a university degree from Glasgow on his job applications in the USA, but this has not been verified by university records from that area.

In 1899 Malloch married Elizabeth Bryan. They had four children: John Stirling (1900), Bessie (1903), James Alexander (1904), and George Graham (1910). In 1910 Malloch immigrated to the United States, settling in Urbana, Illinois. His family did not follow until 1919. By then he had become attached to his housekeeper, Annie Ingle, so after his family's arrival the couple were divorced and Malloch married Mrs Ingle (who had a daughter by a previous marriage). Malloch and Ingle did not have any further children.

By 1912 Malloch had obtained employment in the scientific arena, and spent the remainder of his life studying, collecting, and writing about Diptera, Hymenoptera and other insects in association with the Smithsonian. In 1917, he published a seminal study listing and providing detailed categorization of the known Diptera order.
