= Campsie, East Dunbartonshire =

Civil parish in Scotland

Coordinates: 56°01′04″N 4°14′27″W

Campsie is a civil parish in East Dunbartonshire, Scotland. The parish was formerly part of Stirlingshire.

== Settlements ==
- Auchenreoch
- Clachan of Campsie
- Haughhead
- Lennoxtown
- Milton of Campsie
- Torrance
- Baldernock (at one time the parish encompassed the parish of Baldernock)

== See also ==
- Campsie Fells
- Campsie, New South Wales in Australia
