= John Bell (traveller) =

Scottish medical doctor (1691–1780)

John Bell (1691–1780) was a Scottish medical doctor and traveller to Russia, Iran, and China. While living in Saint Petersburg, Russia, Bell was a member of Russian diplomatic missions to Iran (1715–1718) and China (1719–1722). He later lived in Constantinople (1737–1747) in the Ottoman Empire as a merchant. Bell's book, Travels from St. Petersburg in Russia, to Diverse Parts of Asia, published in 1763, was widely read in Great Britain and Europe.

== Life ==
Bell, son of Patrick Bell and Anabel Stirling, was born at Antermony, near Milton of Campsie, Stirlingshire, in Scotland. He received a classical education and studied medicine in Glasgow. He said of himself, "I had a strong desire to visit foreign countries." He obtained letters of recommendation to Robert Erskine, chief physician and privy counsellor of Tsar Peter the Great of Russia, and in July 1714 departed London to journey to the Russian capital of Saint Petersburg.

Erskine helped Bell to become a member of the Tsar's staff and Bell joined a Russian delegation, headed by Artemy Volynsky, to journey to Persia. The delegation departed Saint Petersburg on 15 July 1715 to establish diplomatic ties and commercial relationships with the Safavid empire of Persia (now Iran). It was a journey of 2,300 miles (3,700 km) in straight line distance, although the route was far from a straight line. The delegation traveled by land to Moscow and Kazan, floated down the Volga River, traversed the Caspian Sea by boat, and continued by land to the Persian capital of Isfahan, arriving there on 14 March 1717 after a journey of twenty months. The delegation departed Isfahan on 1 September 1717 and arrived back in Saint Petersburg on 30 December 1718.

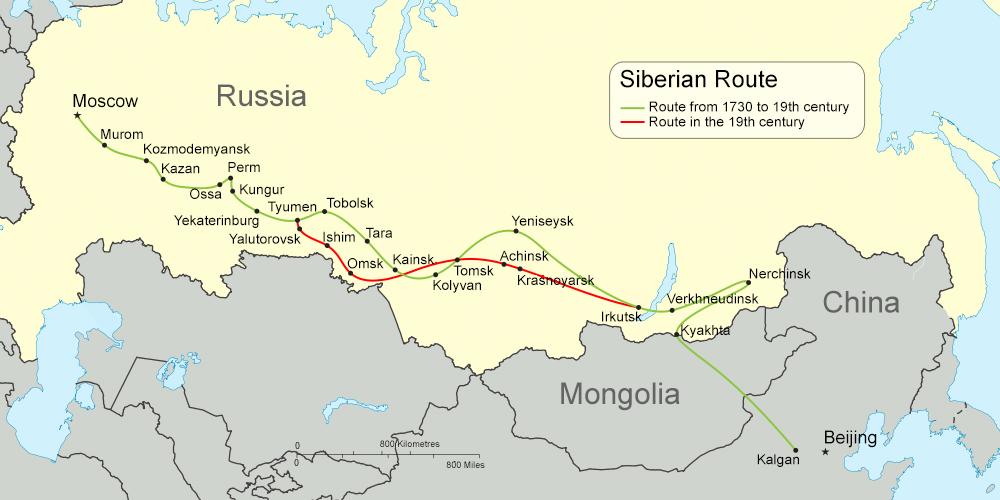
Bell's approximate route to China is shown on this map.

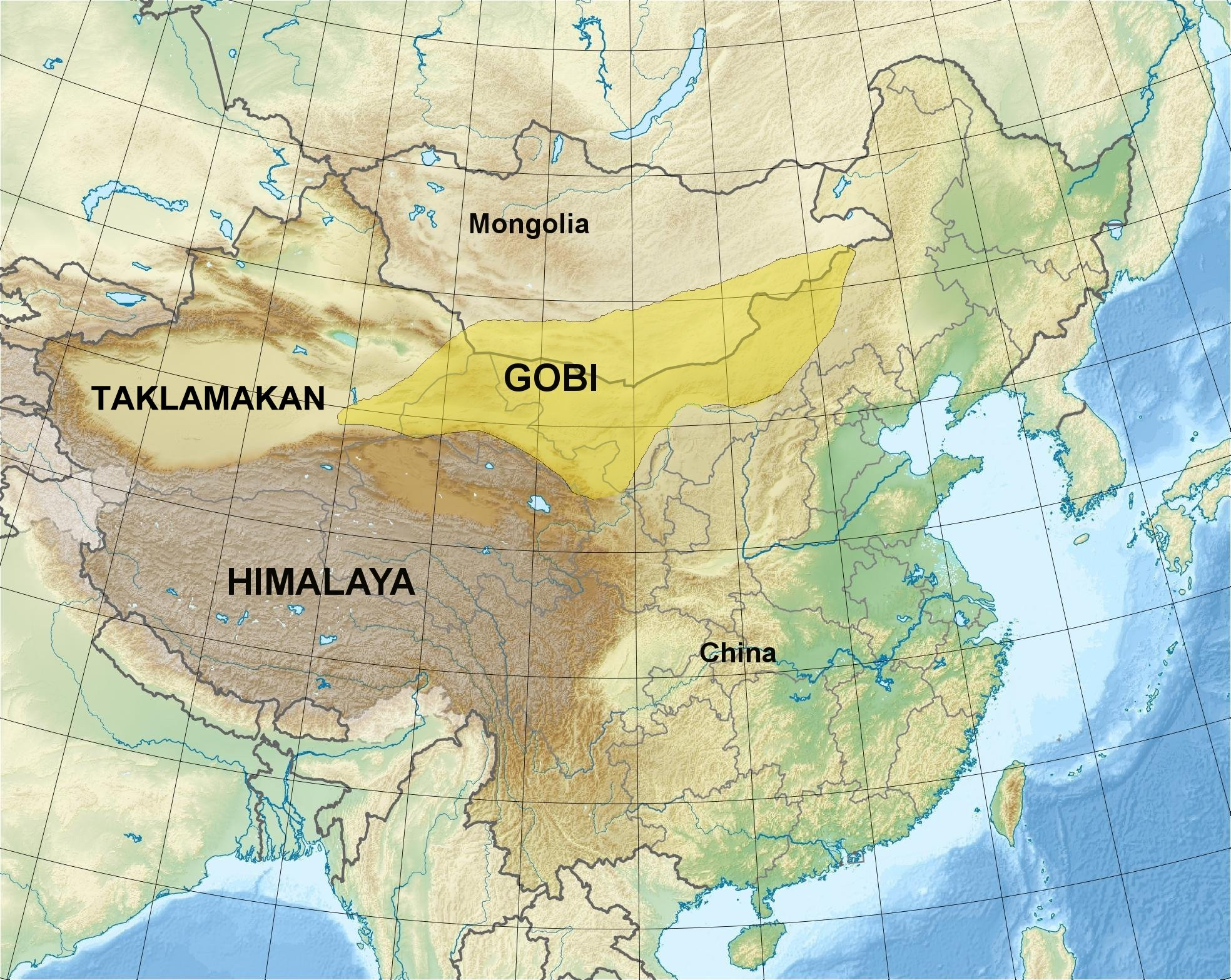
Bell traveled through Mongolia and the Gobi Desert on his journey from Russia to China.

Back in Saint Petersburg, Bell quickly joined another diplomatic mission, this one to China. This was even more of a travel saga than his previous visit to Persia. The straight line distance from Saint Petersburg to Peking, the capital of China, was 4,000 miles (6,400 km) and the route led through frigid Siberia and the Gobi Desert of Mongolia. The delegation left Saint Petersburg on 14 July 1719 and proceeded by land eastward to Irkutsk, near Lake Baikal, before turning south and entering Mongolia, controlled by China, in September 1720 and arriving in Peking on 18 December 1720 after a journey of sixteen months. The delegation departed Peking on 2 March 1721 to return to Russia and arrived in Moscow on 5 January 2022.

Bell had scarcely rested from this last journey when he was summoned to accompany Peter the Great on a military expedition to Derbent (then in the declining Persian Empire} returning to Saint Petersburg in December 1722. He then went back to Scotland where he resided until 1734, when he returned to Saint Petersburg. In 1737, he was sent by the Russians to Constantinople (capital of the Ottoman Empire) where he remained, apparently as a merchant rather than a representative of Russia. In 1746, he married Mary Peters, a Russian, and the couple left Constantinople in 1747 to live in Scotland. He remained in Scotland for the rest of his life. Bell died at Antermony on 1 July 1780, at the advanced age of 89.

Bell's only book, Travels from St. Petersburg in Russia, to Diverse Parts of Asia, was published in two volumes in Glasgow in 1763. The book was quickly translated into French and widely circulated in Europe. In 1817, the Quarterly Review called the book "the best model perhaps for travel-writing in the English language."

John Bell was regarded as "a warm-hearted, benevolent man" known as "Honest John." He had an "amiable simplicity of manners" and "the most sacred regard for the truth in all he said and did."

== Bibliography ==
- Chambers, R.; et al. (1857). "Bell, John, of Antermony". Biographical Dictionary of Eminent Scotsmen. Vol. 1. Glasgow: Blackie and Son. pp. 203–204.
- This article incorporates text from a publication now in the public domain: Chisholm, Hugh, ed. (1911). "Bell, John". Encyclopædia Britannica. Vol. 3 (11th ed.). Cambridge University Press. p. 686.
- Harrison, R. [at Wikisource] (1885). "Bell, John (1691-1780)". In Stephen, Leslie (ed.). Dictionary of National Biography. Vol. 4. London: Smith, Elder & Co. pp. 166–167.
