= Haughhead =

Coordinates: 55.984°N 4.231°W

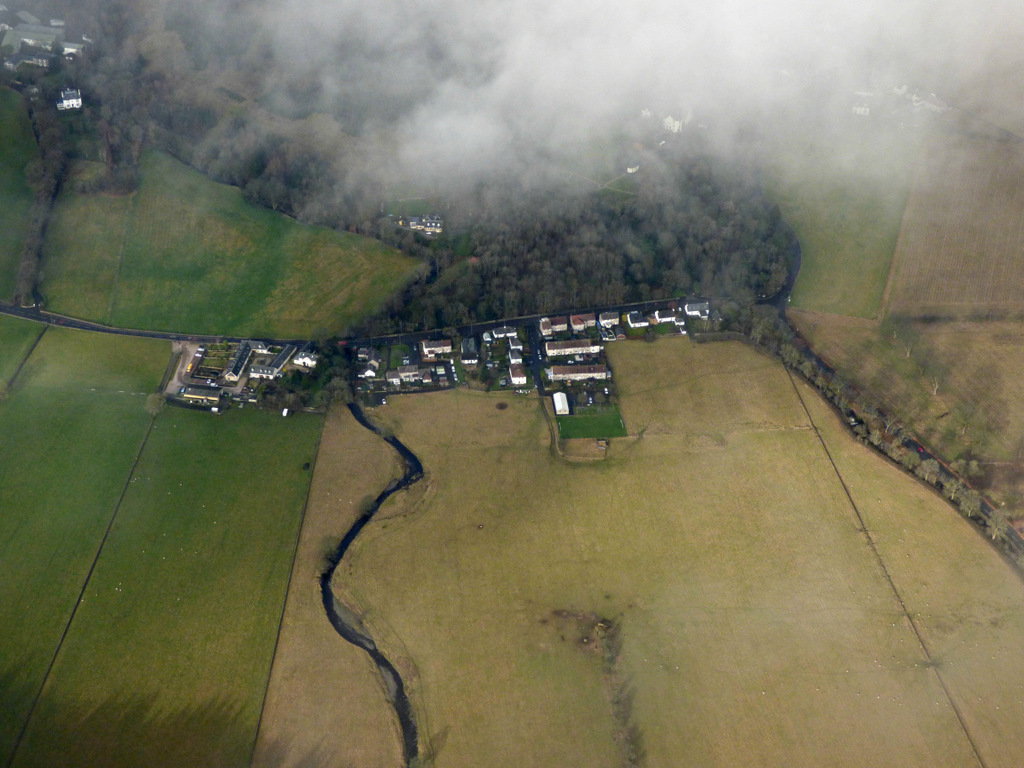

- Location within East Dunbartonshire
- OS grid reference: NS6079
- Council area: East Dunbartonshire
- Lieutenancy area: Dunbartonshire
- Country: Scotland
- Sovereign state: United Kingdom
- Post town: GLASGOW
- Postcode district: G66
- Dialling code: 0141
- Police: Scotland
- Fire: Scottish
- Ambulance: Scottish
- UK Parliament: Cumbernauld, Kilsyth and Kirkintilloch East
- Scottish Parliament: Strathkelvin and Bearsden

Haughhead is a hamlet two miles from Lennoxtown in East Dunbartonshire, Scotland. It was historically part of Stirlingshire until 1975, when it became part of Strathclyde along with many other towns and villages.

== Schoenstatt ==
Haughhead is home to a Retreat Centre called Schoenstatt. The Schoenstatts Sisters of Mary was founded in Germany in 1926 by Father Joseph Kentenich and is one of six Secular Institutes belonging to the Schoenstatt family. They are a community of consecrated women who have committed themselves to surrender to god in the spirit of Evangelical Counsels. At the present time, 2013, there are three sisters in the Schoenstatt in Haughhead. An annual school trip of all of the Catholic primary schools in the East Dunbartonshire area, is made to the Schoenstatt complex.
