= Auchenreoch =

Coordinates: 55.95°N 04.13°W

Auchenreoch: Scottish Gaelic: An t-Achadh Riabhach
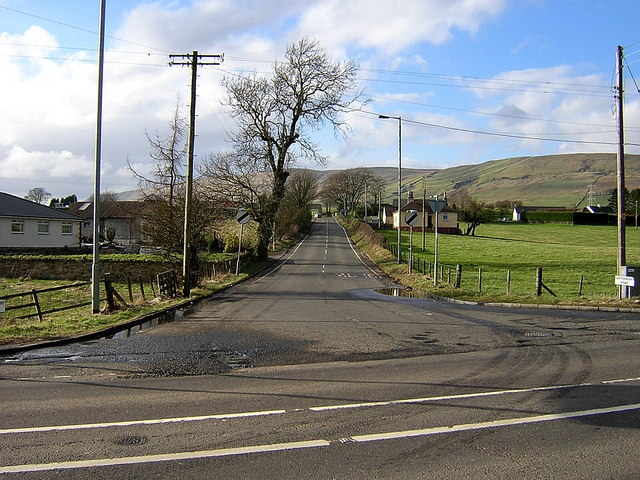
- Antermony Road at Auchenreoch

- Location within East Dunbartonshire
- OS grid reference: NS6776
- Civil parish: Campsie
- Council area: East Dunbartonshire
- Lieutenancy area: Dunbartonshire
- Country: Scotland
- Sovereign state: United Kingdom
- Post town: Glasgow
- Postcode district: G66
- Police: Scotland
- Fire: Scottish
- Ambulance: Scottish
- UK Parliament: Cumbernauld, Kilsyth and Kirkintilloch East
- Scottish Parliament: Strathkelvin and Bearsden

Auchenreoch, or Auchinreoch is a small hamlet formerly in Stirlingshire but now in East Dunbartonshire, Scotland near Kilsyth and Kirkintilloch.

A sparsely populated farming community, within the hamlet is Auchinreoch Stables. The stable was the home of famous Grand National winner Red Rum from the horse's retirement from racing in 1978 until his death in 1995.
