= Boclair Academy =

Coordinates: 55°54′59″N 4°18′14″W

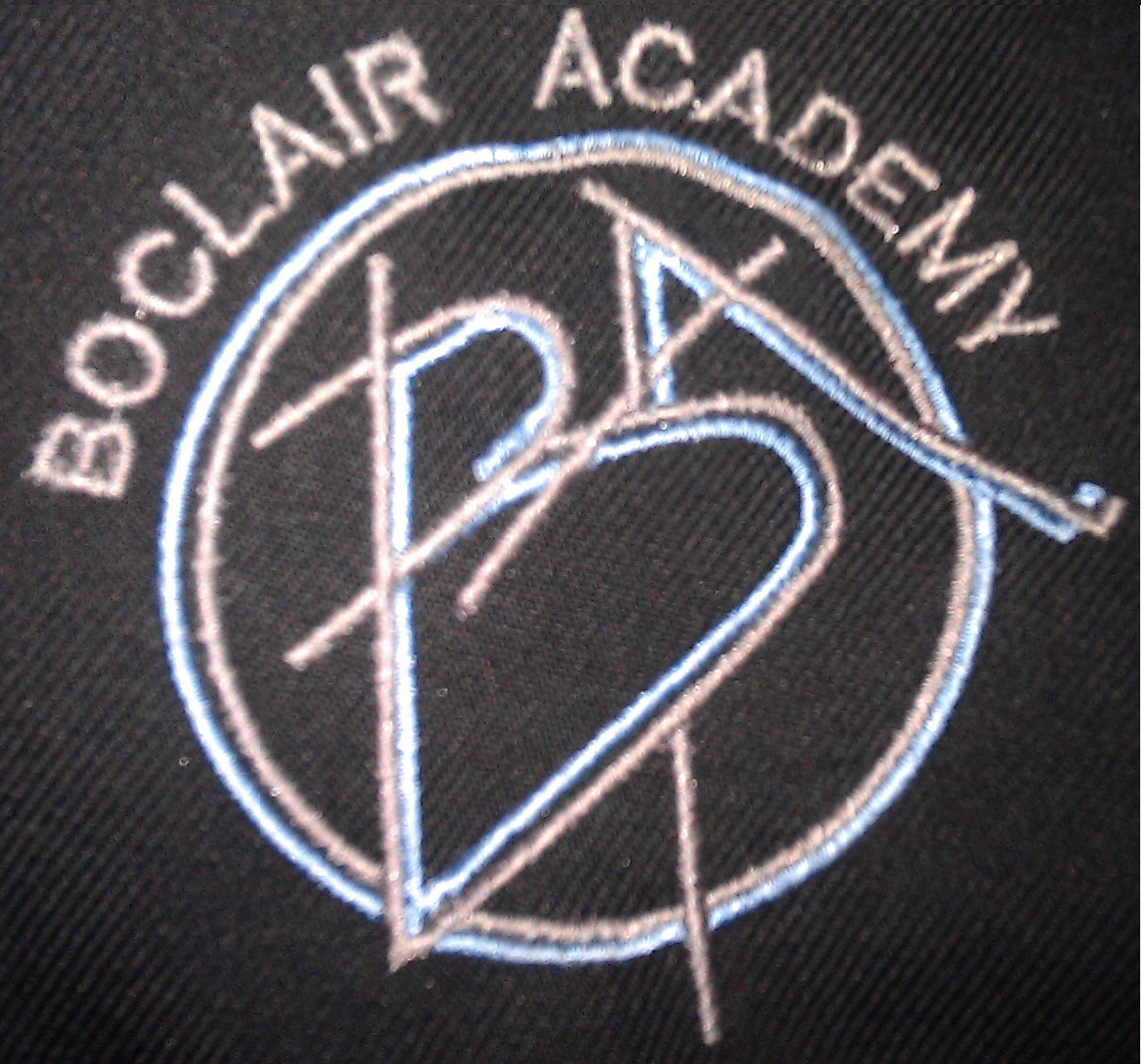

Location
- Inveroran Drive; Bearsden, East Dunbartonshire, G61 2PL; Scotland

Information
- Type: State secondary school
- Motto: Respect, Honesty, Fairness, Achievement
- Established: 1977
- Headteacher: Douglas Brown
- Chaplain: Rev. Hamilton
- Gender: Co-educational
- Age: 11 to 18
- Enrolment: 1008 (Sept. 2020)
- Campus: 16 acres (6.5 ha)
Colour
Junior colours
Senior colours
- Staff: 73 (2019–2020)
- Feeder Schools: Torrance Primary, Killermont Primary, Westerton Primary, Colquhoun Park Primary
- Website: http://www.boclair.e-dunbarton.sch.uk

Boclair Academy, a co-educational comprehensive secondary school located in the Greater Glasgow suburb of Bearsden, East Dunbartonshire, Scotland, serves pupils aged 11 to 18 from Southern Bearsden, Westerton and Torrance. Boclair Academy is affiliated with four local primary schools within its catchment area: Westerton Primary School, Killermont Primary School, Colquhoun Park Primary School and Torrance Primary School. The school's exam achievement has improved in recent years: in 2023 74% of S5 gained at least 5 Higher passes (A–C), ranking Boclair sixth in Scotland for a state school.

== History and recent upgrades ==
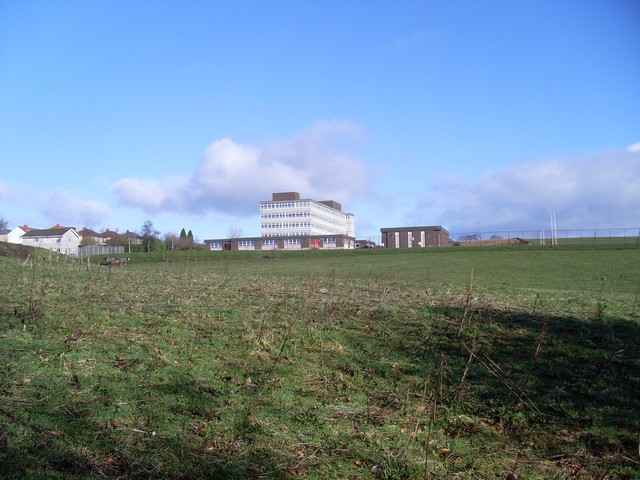
Boclair Academy from Kessington Road

Boclair Academy was built in 1976 to meet increased demand in the area; initially the school accommodated overflow with Douglas Academy and Bearsden Academy but later the school had an increased number of placing requests from outside East Dunbartonshire. In 1998, because the school was over capacity, an annexe was erected for the Maths department.

In June 2016, Rangers F.C. announced a partnership with East Dunbartonshire Council which saw 24 of the club's youth players aged 11 to 15 attend Boclair Academy to allow them to combine their academic and football studies. The school is located close to the Rangers training ground at Auchenhowie.

The School moved into a new building situated on the rugby pitch of the old school building at the start of the 2022–2023 academic year.

== HMIe inspection ==
The school's last inspection was carried out in January 2009 by Her Majesty's Inspectorate of Education (merged in 2011 with Learning and Teaching Scotland to form Education Scotland). The report, published 17 March 2009, was largely positive and praised the following strengths:

- Positive relationships between staff and young people
- Enthusiastic, well-motivated and friendly young people
- High-quality learning and teaching in all departments
- Consistently high attainment in national examinations
- Effective partnership working to support young people with additional support needs
- Effective pastoral support for young people moving from primary school into S1, particularly for those most likely to find the move difficult.

HMIe also agreed the following areas for improvement with the school and education authority:

- Continue to improve learning and teaching by better sharing of good practice and through more effective self-evaluation
- Continue to improve achievement by building more effectively on young people's learning at primary school and through better links with community partners.

The inspection of the school was accompanied by an inspection of the learning community surrounding Boclair Academy. There was also a follow through report, which evaluated the school's progress, published by East Dunbartonshire Council in February 2011.

The following is according to the "student planner" 2013–2014 issued to all pupils (see Bibliography below)

== Departmental facilities and equipment ==
=== Physical education ===
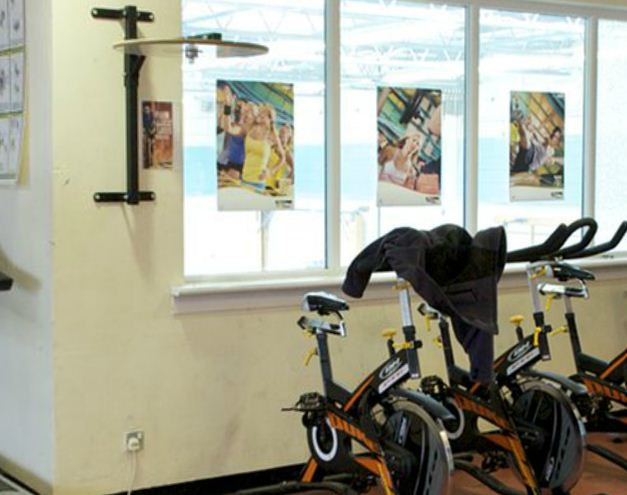
Exercise bikes in the PE fitness room. The windows look down on the small games hall.

The PE department used to have a swimming pool in the old building. Now it has a variety of equipment to cater for sporting activities within two games halls (used for gymnastics, circuit training, social dance, badminton, basketball, football, and indoor games such as Danish Longball) and an outside area consisting of two all-weather pitches for football and hockey, two grass rugby pitches, and spare grass areas used for football. In the PE department there is also a fitness room.

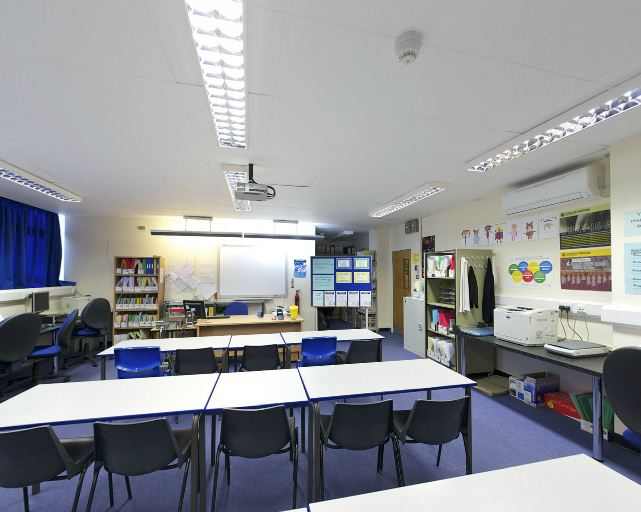
interior of typical classroom

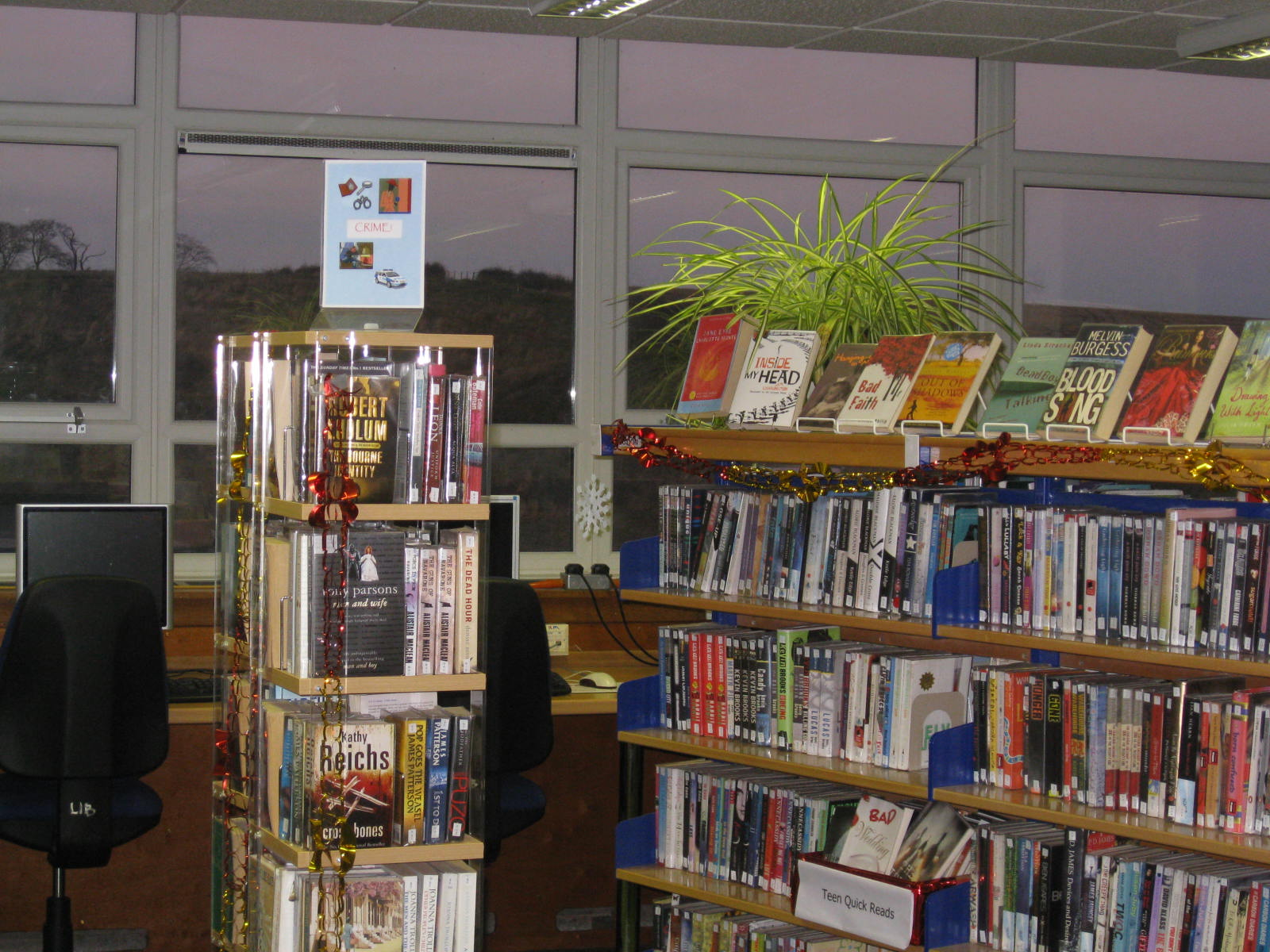
The school library, showing computer suite

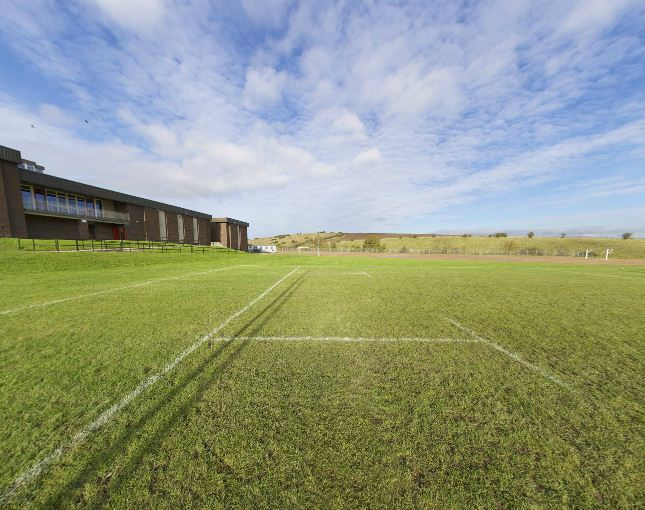
Picture taken from grass rugby pitch shows all-weather pitches (red) in background and PE block on the left.

=== RMPS ===
The Religious, Moral and Philosophical Studies department runs a chess club and a debating society which has produced finalists in the Junior English-Speaking Union Scotland debating competition and more recently semi-finalists in the Law Society of Scotland Donald Dewar Memorial Competition.

== In the news ==
- The Evening Times reported on a pupil beating the UK Pi memorising record (12 May 2008).
- The BBC reported on a technician being injured following an explosion in the school laboratory (23 June 2009).

== Popular culture ==
The school building has been used for several sketches in the second series of Burnistoun. (see Bibliography below)

== Notable alumni ==
- Tommy Reilly, musician, the winner of Orange Unsigned Act 2008, was a pupil at the school until 2007.

== Bibliography ==
- "Episode 3", Burnistoun Series 2, BBC One, television, First Broadcast 18 April 2011.
- Boclair Academy School Handbook 2012–2013
- Boclair Academy Student Planner 2012–2013
