= Milton of Campsie =

Coordinates: 55.96428°N 4.161952°W

- Location within East Dunbartonshire
- Population: 3,910 (2020)
- OS grid reference: NS553744
- Council area: East Dunbartonshire
- Country: Scotland
- Sovereign state: United Kingdom
- Post town: GLASGOW
- Postcode district: G66
- Police: Scotland
- Fire: Scottish
- Ambulance: Scottish
- UK Parliament: Mid Dunbartonshire
- Scottish Parliament: Strathkelvin and Bearsden

Milton of Campsie is a village formerly in the county of Stirlingshire, but now in East Dunbartonshire, Scotland roughly 10 miles (16 km) north of Glasgow. Nestling at the foot of the Campsie Fells, it is neighboured by Kirkintilloch and Lennoxtown.

== History ==
The old church was built over the grave of St Machan around 1170 making it one of the earliest churches in Scotland.

The railway station was built here in 1848 and originally simply called Milton Station. In 1912 it was renamed Milton of Campsie Station and it closed in 1951.

== Overview ==
The village expanded greatly in the 1970s with the addition of modern housing estates by Barratt and Bellway, the latter being more extensive.

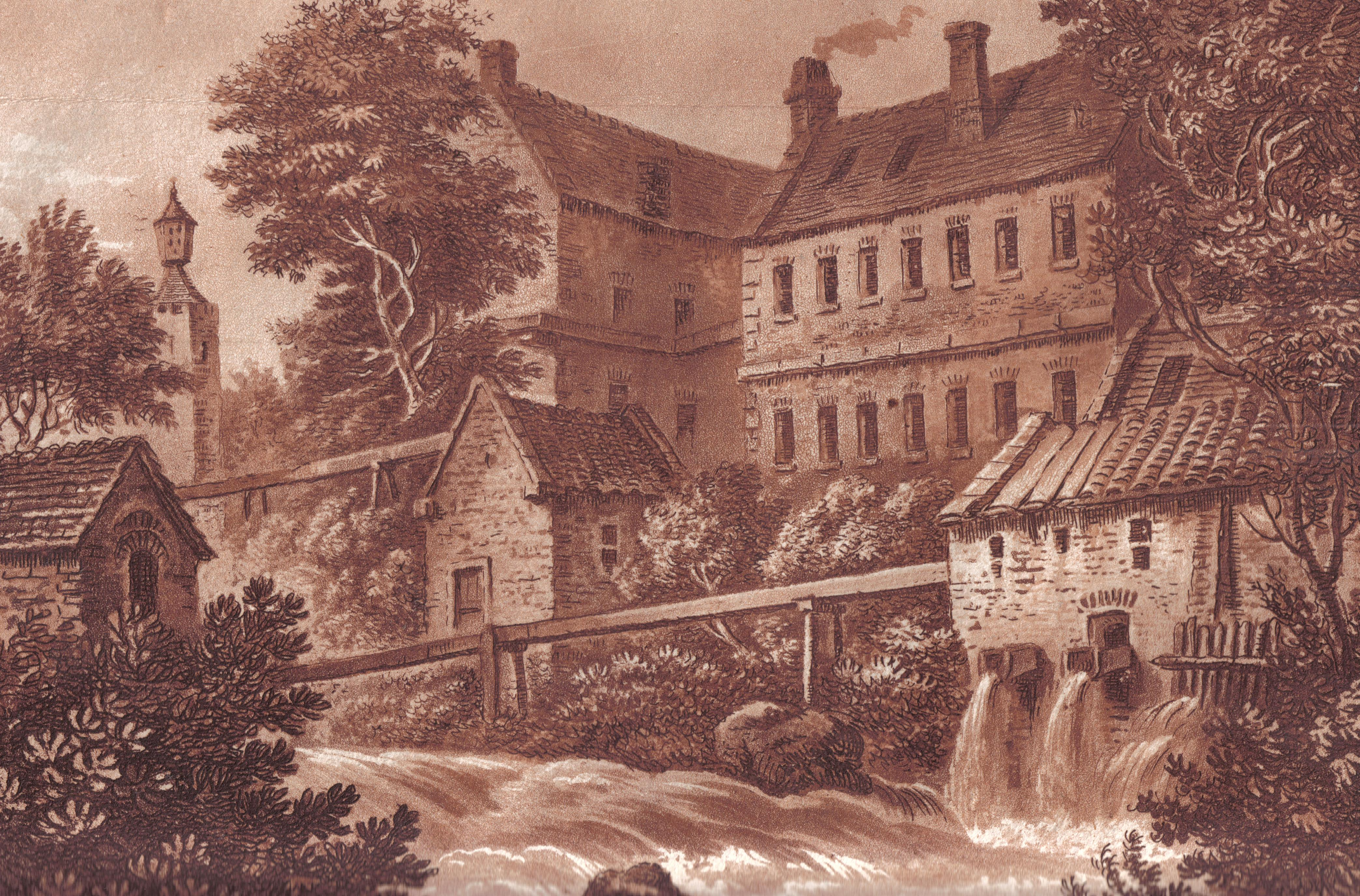
McDowall's & Co. mills at Milton in 1800.

It has one full sized grass football park in what is known locally as "The Battlefield", as well as another smaller football field at Beechtree Park. Amenities include a newsagent, a Co-op Store (the converted 'Craigfoot Inn' and a Scotmid, Post Office, pharmacy, two hairdressing salons and now a Coffee House. The Kincaid House Hotel consisted of accommodation and licensed bars and restaurants until it closed in 2024.

Milton of Campsie Old Parish Church situated on Antermony Road has closed with a new Church now completed for use (Incorporating the Stirling Hall) at Locheil Drive. The Roman Catholic church, St Paul's, is located nearby on Cairnview Road.

Until the late nineteenth century, the Kincaid and Lennox families were influential in Milton of Campsie.

A small plaque at the centre of the village commemorates the accidental landing of the Italian diplomat and balloonist, Vincenzo Lunardi, on 5 December 1785.

Directly across from Scotmid and next to the church there is a small World War I and World War II memorial to commemorate the men of the village who gave their lives for Britain. At the Cross there is an open seating area called "The Old Man's Rest"; previously there was a shelter for an earlier generation.

== Education ==
Milton of Campsie also has a non-denominational Primary School called Craighead Primary School. The road that passes next to the Post Office is called School Lane. There is also a nursery school which was formerly in a separate building but has moved to be inside the primary school building.

== Transport ==
Milton of Campsie was served by the railway for over a hundred years from 1848 until it was closed to passenger traffic in 1951. The Campsie Branch ran from the junction of the Edinburgh & Glasgow Line at Lenzie and dropped down through Kirkintilloch, to terminate in Lennoxtown, although a 'through-road' continued on the Blane Valley Line to Strathblane, then onto the tourist route to Aberfoyle in the Trossachs. The village is served by the half-hourly First Glasgow X85 Service from Glasgow Buchanan Street Bus Station. The village is where the B757 meets the A891.

== Notable residents ==
- John Bell, doctor and traveller
- Rev John Collins (d.1648) minister of Campsie murdered by a local laird who then married Collins' wife
- Martin Creed, artist
- Lesley Fitz-Simons, Take the High Road actress
- Gary McKinnon, hacker
- Laura Miller, journalist
- Dawn Steele, actress
- Gudrun Ure, actress
- Murray Wallace, rugby player

== See also ==
- Campsie, Stirlingshire
- Campsie Fells
