= Kelvin Valley Railway =

Former railway line in Scotland

Overview
- Locale: Scotland

History
- Opened: 1878
- Successor line: North British Railway
- Closed: 1951

Technical
- Line length: 11 1/2 miles (18.5 km)
- Track gauge: 4 ft 8 1/2 in (1,435 mm)

The Kelvin Valley Railway (KVR) was an independent railway designed to connect Kilsyth, an important mining town in central Scotland, with the railway network. It connected Kilsyth to Kirkintilloch and thence over other railways to the ironworks of Coatbridge, and to Maryhill, connecting onwards to the Queen's Dock at Stobcross.

The line opened in 1878. The hoped-for passenger traffic never developed, but the coal traffic from Kilsyth to the River Clyde was buoyant for many years. Motor bus competition had greatly reduced the passenger use of the line, and it closed to passengers in 1951. The mineral traffic was also declining and, in 1966, the line closed completely. None of it is active for rail purposes now.

== History ==
=== Kilsyth ===
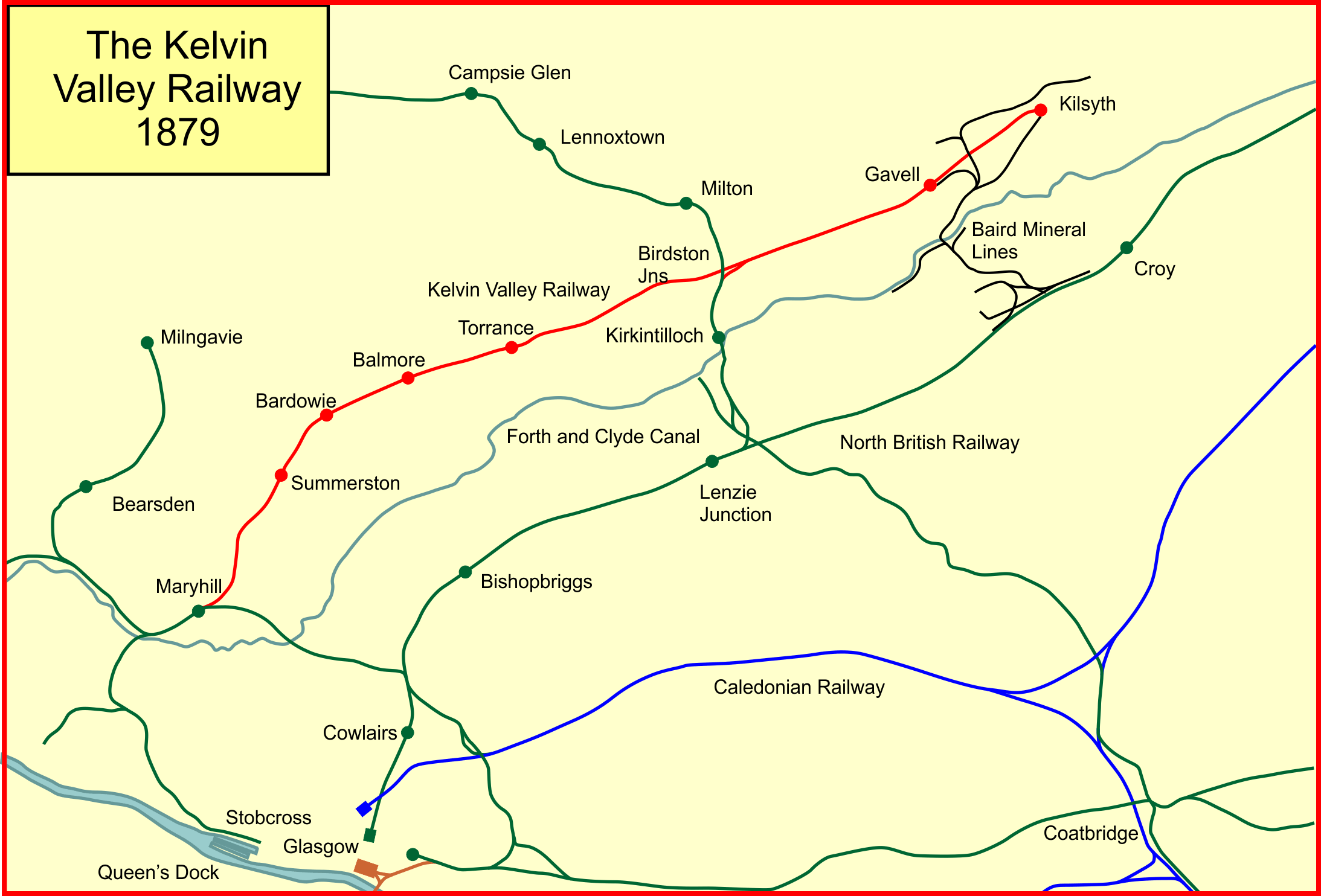
System map of the Kelvin Valley Railway

Kilsyth had become an important quarrying and mining centre, as well as having a chemical works and coke ovens. Iron ore extraction was largely controlled by James Baird and his company, Baird Brothers of Gartsherrie. The ore was taking on an increasing importance as the best of the ores in the Monklands were being exhausted.

Kilsyth was close to the Forth and Clyde Canal and Bairds had created an extensive mineral tramway system connecting their pits and the canal, but in the railway age, the remoteness of the nearest main line was a serious disadvantage.

Local promoters set about creating a railway to rectify the problem: the destination for the minerals was to be Coatbridge and Maryhill. Coatbridge was the centre of iron smelting, and it was to be reached by connecting to the Campsie Branch of the North British Railway near Birdston; the Campsie branch later became part of the Glasgow to Aberfoyle Line. From the Campsie branch, the routing was to the Monkland and Kirkintilloch Railway. Maryhill gave access to the River Clyde: the Stobcross Railway was being prepared to serve what became the Queen's Dock on the north bank of the Clyde. Onward shipborne transport from there would obviously be possible. The promoters also hoped that high class residences would be built along the line, creating residential travel to business in Glasgow.

=== A proposed railway ===
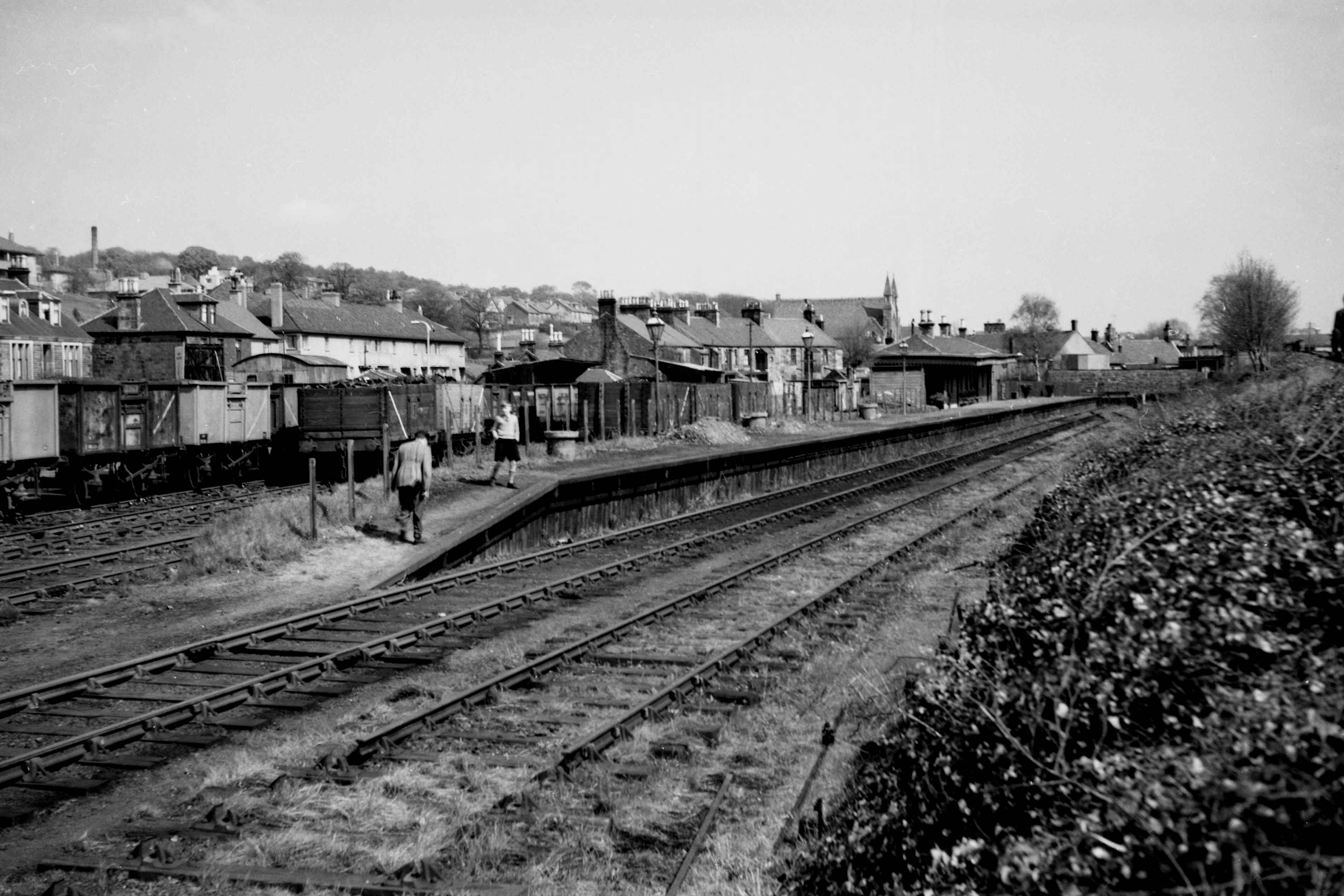
Disused Kilsyth station in 1958

In 1873 a prospectus was issued for the Kelvin Valley Railway, and considerable local support was generated. The North British Railway (NBR) agreed to work the line, but the NBR was not enthusiastic about the prospects for the line, and only acquiesced to keep the rival Caledonian Railway out of the area.

Kelvin Valley Railway Act 1873
- Act of Parliament
- Parliament of the United Kingdom
- Long title: An Act for making a Railway from the Glasgow, Dumbarton, and Helensburgh Railway to Kilsyth, and a Railway therefrom to the Campsie Branch of the North British Railway Company; and for other purposes.
- Citation: 36 & 37 Vict. c. clxxv

Dates
- Royal assent: 21 July 1873

Text of statute as originally enacted

The Kelvin Valley Railway was incorporated by an act of Parliament, the Kelvin Valley Railway Act 1873 (36 & 37 Vict. c. clxxv), on 21 July 1873, for a line from Kilsyth to Maryhill and a short spur line to the Campsie branch at Birdston. The authorised capital was £90,000.

The independent company failed to generate the subscriptions necessary to construct the line, particularly in the face of the manifest reluctance of the NBR. Baird Brothers already had an extensive mineral tramway network in the Kilsyth area serving their mines and smelters, and they were no strangers to the use of their power to influence events. They threatened to promote a railway running eastward from Kilsyth to join the Caledonian Railway branch at Denny. The transit for their mineral traffic to Glasgow would have been longer, but from the NBR's point of view the whole of the business would be lost to a competitor.

Kilsyth Railway Act 1876
- Act of Parliament
- Parliament of the United Kingdom
- Long title: An Act for making a Railway from the authorized Kelvin Valley Railway to Kilsyth, in the County of Stirling; and for other Purposes.
- Citation: 39 & 40 Vict. c. cviii

Dates
- Royal assent: 13 July 1876

Text of statute as originally enacted

The NBR now promoted a Kilsyth Railway. This was to run through Strathkelvin from Kilsyth to Birdston, joining the Campsie branch there and giving access to both Coatbridge and Glasgow over their own lines; and the proposal also included an eastward line to reach Falkirk and to join the Caledonian at Bonnybridge; clearly the latter was intended to exclude the Caledonian Railway from further incursion. The Kilsyth Railway was authorised by the Kilsyth Railway Act 1876 (39 & 40 Vict. c. cviii) on 13 July 1876.

Kelvin Valley Railway Act 1877
- Act of Parliament
- Parliament of the United Kingdom
- Long title: An Act to vest in the Kelvin Valley Railway Company the Undertaking of the Kilsyth Railway Company; and for other purposes.
- Citation: 40 & 41 Vict. c. xvii

Dates
- Royal assent: 17 May 1877

Text of statute as originally enacted

Having secured authority for this entirely tactical railway, the NBR now came to terms with Baird Brothers and the Kelvin Valley promoters, and it was agreed to build the Kelvin Valley line generally as originally planned, only deviating near Kilsyth to adopt the Kilsyth Railway alignment, as this suited Baird Brothers better. This compromise was ratified by Parliament on 17 May 1877, when the Kilsyth Railway was dissolved by the Kelvin Valley Railway Act 1877 (40 & 41 Vict. c. xvii). The NBR subscribed £30,000 to the Kelvin Valley and agreed to work the line for 50% of gross receipts, provisionally guaranteeing 5.25% on capital.

=== Partial opening ===
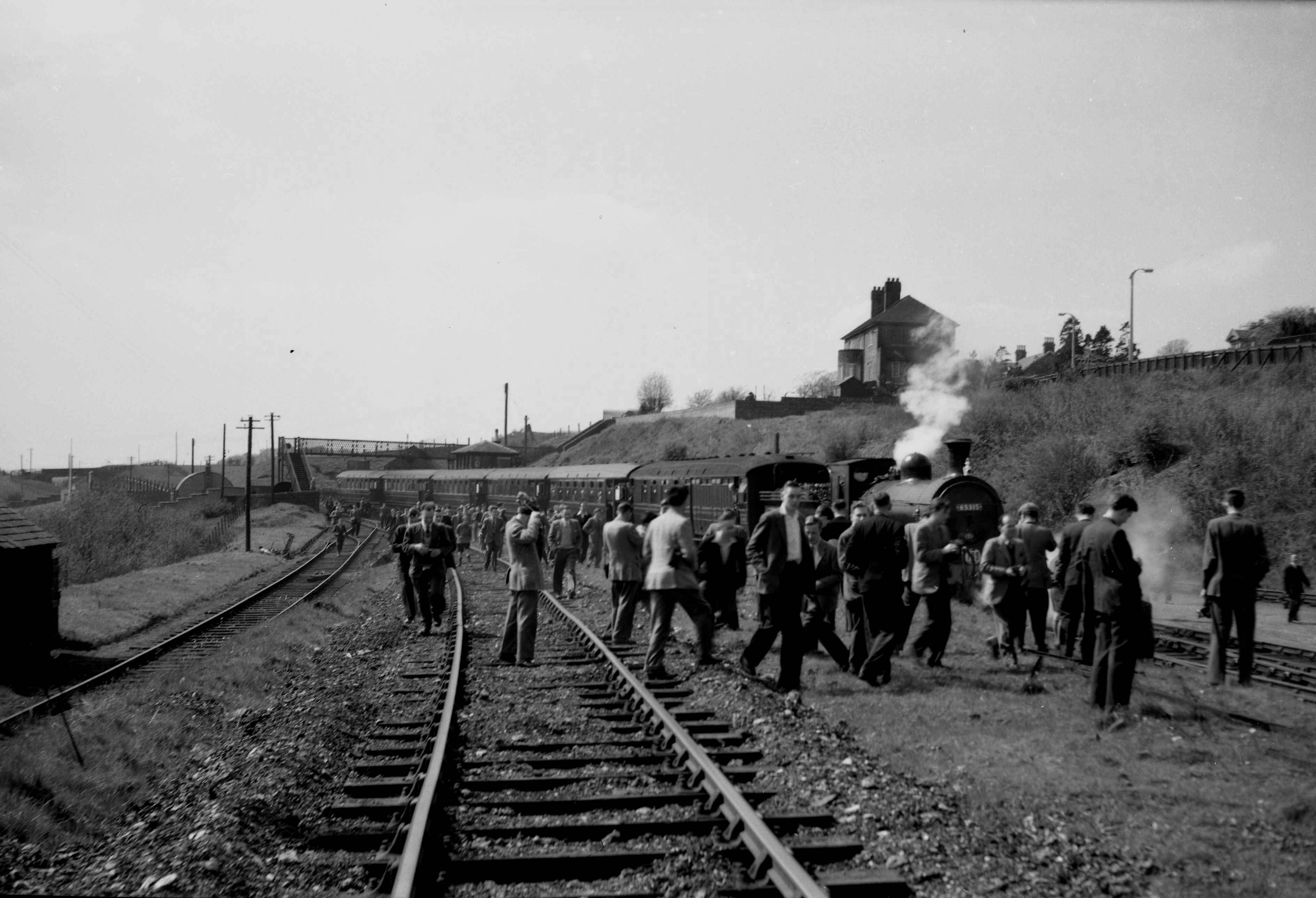
Railtour at Kilsyth in 1958.

The North British Railway saw that Kilsyth was the only place on the line of any commercial interest, and it proceeded to build the line through Strathkelvin from Kilsyth to Birdston, giving access to its own network via Kirkintilloch. That section was opened on 1 June 1878. This opened up access for minerals from Kilsyth to the new Queen's Dock on the Clyde, via Lenzie and over the Stobcross Railway, and of course passengers could travel to Glasgow via Lenzie.

It appears that the NBR had become the project manager for the scheme. The NBR put no emphasis on the western section of the line, from Birdston to Maryhill: opening it would in any case abstract revenue from their own lines on which the traffic was flowing. However agitation from the Kelvin Valley company – of course principally the Baird Brothers – motivated it to construct that section; it was open for goods traffic on 4 June 1879. The connection at Maryhill was not made, and the passenger stations and goods facilities at the stations were not ready: the NBR was evidently doing the minimum it was required to do.

At a shareholders' meeting on 25 September 1879, the reason emerged: £66,000 of NBR money had been subscribed to the Kelvin Valley; only £30,000 had been authorised by the shareholders. Moreover, NBR directors had been illegally trading in Kelvin Valley shares, and having made a loss of £1,400, they had been reimbursed out of NBR funds.

The Maryhill connection was made on 1 October 1879, but the passenger service to Kilsyth was still routed through Kirkintilloch, except for a single journey each way between Maryhill and the one-platform halt at Torrance. The Torrance to Birdston section had no passenger service. Once again the KVR directors protested, and the NBR extended the Maryhill to Torrance train to Kilsyth from 29 October 1880. The additional revenue was negligible and the NBR discontinued the extended journey from 31 December 1880.

=== Absorbed by the NBR ===
The KVR was absorbed by the North British Railway on 1 August 1885 under the North British Railway Act 1885 (48 & 49 Vict. c. cxix). The declared cost of constructing the line was £77,308. KVR shareholders were to receive a guaranteed 4% dividend for two years and thereafter 5% in perpetuity.

The NBR opened the Glasgow City and District Railway in 1886, providing a through east-west sub-surface route through Glasgow. This hugely relieved the pressure on the cramped and congested Queen Street terminus, and the NBR was now able to establish a passenger service pattern over the Maryhill line. From 1886, trains generally started at Bridgeton Cross, running through Queen Street Low Level and Maryhill, to Torrance and Kilsyth. The previous passenger service through Lenzie and Kirkintilloch continued as well. However the passenger business on the routes remained very quiet, the residential development never having taken place. Sunday school excursions to the rural beauty spots on the line provided the most animated business.

Baird's internal tramway system connected both to the Kelvin Valley line at Kilsyth and the former Edinburgh and Glasgow Railway main line at Gartshore (a little west of Croy), but the company sent the bulk of its mineral traffic over the Kelvin Valley line to quays on the Clyde, and this proved to be the dominant source of income for the line.

On 2 July 1888 the Kilsyth and Bonnybridge Railway opened, running eastwards from the KVR station at Kilsyth, and connecting to the Caledonian Railway line at Larbert Junction, via Bonnybridge.

=== The twentieth century ===
The North British Railway became a constituent of the new London and North Eastern Railway (LNER) at the grouping of the railways of Great Britain, following the Railways Act 1921. By this time motor buses and improved roads were abstracting much passenger and goods traffic from the railway.

Nationalisation of the railways followed in 1948, and the line was part of British Railways Scottish Region. A review of heavily loss-making passenger services at this time included the Kelvin Valley line, and closure to passengers followed on 31 March 1951 for the Maryhill to Kilsyth service, and on 4 August 1951 (Note: Dates of last train service.) for the Kirkintilloch to Kilsyth trains.

The line remained open for goods traffic for the time being. In 1958 driver training on new diesel multiple unit trains took place on the line.

In 1960 an enthusiasts' railtour ran on the line, hauled by the preserved locomotive Glen Douglas, which is now housed in the Riverside Museum in Glasgow. In 1966 freight traffic ceased and the line was closed completely.

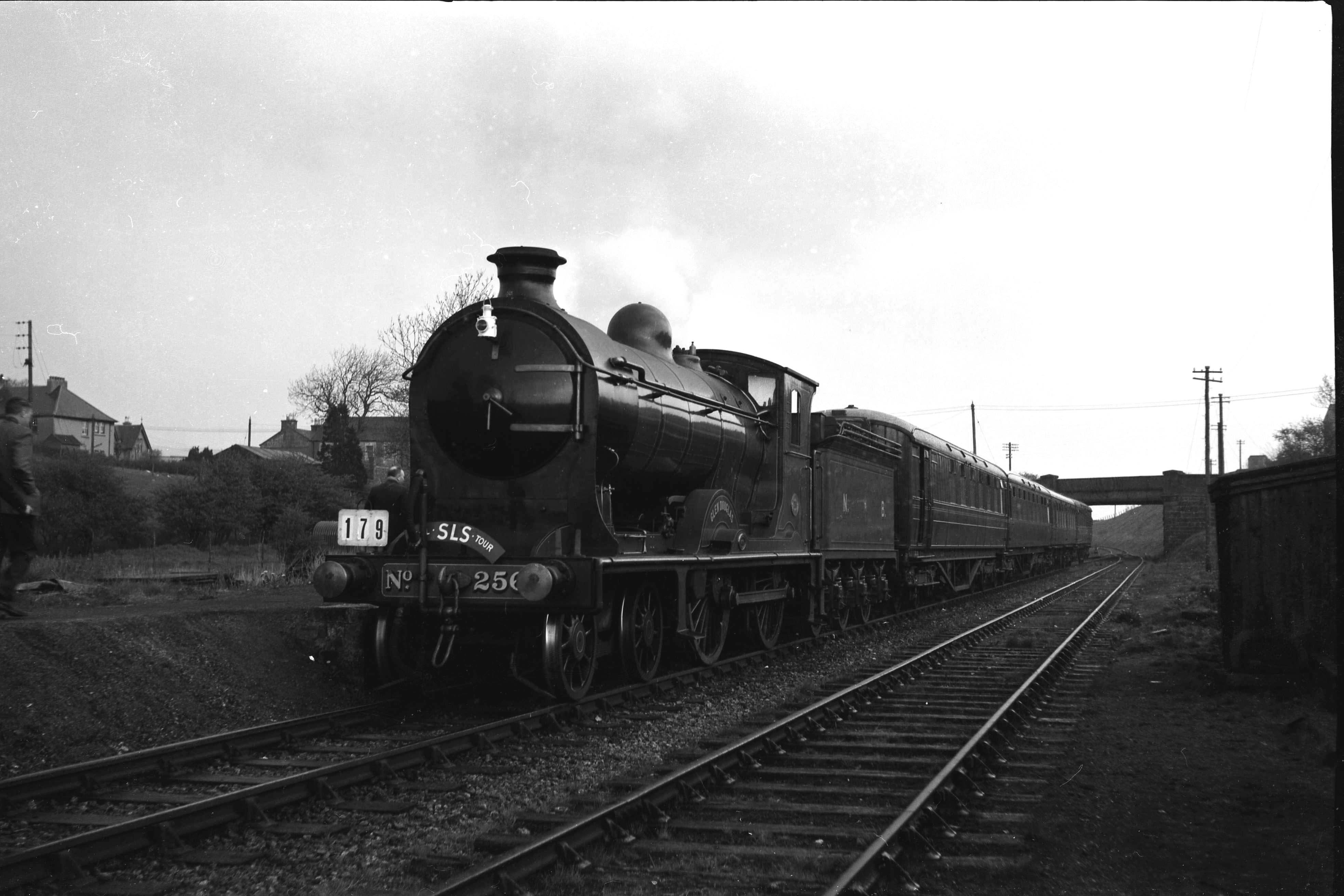
At Torrance in 1960 with a railtour. The train was hauled by preserved steam locomotive Glen Douglas.

== Topography ==
The line opened between Birdston Junction and Kilsyth on 1 June 1878, and between Maryhill and Birdston Junction on 1 October 1879.

Locations on the route were:

- Maryhill East Junction; diverges from the North British Railway Helensburgh line;
- Summerston; closed 2 April 1951; note: there is now a Summerston station on the Anniesland to Glasgow Queen Street line, opened in 1993;
- Bardowie; opened 1 June 1905; closed 20 July 1931;
- Balmore; opened April 1886; closed 2 April 1951;
- Torrance; closed 2 April 1951;
- Kelvin Valley East Junction; convergence of spur line from Birdston Junction (or Kelvin Valley West Junction) on the Campsie Branch;
- Gavell; opened December 1878; renamed Twechar 1924; closed 6 August 1951;
- Kilsyth; renamed Kilsyth Old between 1936 and 1937; may also have been called Kilsyth Junction; the Kilysth and Bonnybridge Railway made an end-on connection from 1888; closed 6 August 1951.
