= East Dunbartonshire =

Council area of Scotland

East Dunbartonshire: Siorrachd Dhùn Bhreatann an Ear (Scottish Gaelic); Aest Dunbartanshire (Scots)
- Council area
- Coat of arms

- East Dunbartonshire shown within Scotland
- Coordinates: 55°56′N 4°13′W
- Sovereign state: United Kingdom
- Country: Scotland
- Lieutenancy area: Dunbartonshire
- Unitary authority: 1 April 1996
- Administrative HQ: Kirkintilloch

Government
  - Type: Council
  - Body: East Dunbartonshire Council
  - Control: No overall control
  - MPs: 2 MPs: Susan Murray (LD); Katrina Murray (L)
  - MSPs: 2 MSPs: Adam Harley (LD); Marie McNair (SNP)

Area
  - Total: 67 sq mi (174 km^{2})
  - Rank: 27th

Population (2025)
  - Total: 109,550
  - Rank: 21st
  - Density: 1,630/sq mi (628/km^{2})
- Time zone: UTC+0 (GMT)
  - Summer (DST): UTC+1 (BST)
- ISO 3166 code: GB-EDU
- GSS code: S12000045
- Website: eastdunbarton.gov.uk

East Dunbartonshire (Scots: Aest Dunbartanshire; Scottish Gaelic: Siorrachd Dhùn Bhreatann an Ear, pronounced [ˈʃirˠəxk ɣun ˈvɾʲɛht̪ən̪ˠ ə ˈɲɛɾ]) is one of the 32 council areas of Scotland. It borders Glasgow City Council Area to the south, North Lanarkshire to the east, Stirling to the north, and West Dunbartonshire to the west. East Dunbartonshire contains many of the suburbs in the north of Greater Glasgow, including Bearsden, Milngavie, Bishopbriggs, Kirkintilloch, Lenzie, Twechar, Milton of Campsie, Balmore, and Torrance, as well as some other of Glasgow's commuter towns and villages. The council area covers parts of the historic counties of Dunbartonshire, Lanarkshire, and Stirlingshire.

The council area was formed in 1996, as a result of the Local Government etc. (Scotland) Act 1994, from the former Bearsden and Milngavie districts and most of the former Strathkelvin district, which had been part of the Strathclyde region.

== History ==
East Dunbartonshire was created in 1996 under the Local Government etc. (Scotland) Act 1994, which abolished the regions and districts which had been created in 1975, replacing them with unitary council areas. East Dunbartonshire covered the area of the abolished Bearsden and Milngavie and Strathkelvin districts (except the Chryston and Auchinloch area from the latter, which went to North Lanarkshire). Both former districts had been in the Strathclyde region.

Both of East Dunbartonshire's predecessor districts had been created in 1975 under the Local Government (Scotland) Act 1973. The Bearsden and Milngavie district had been created covering Milngavie, Bearsden and adjoining areas from Dunbartonshire. The Strathkelvin district had been created covering Kirkintilloch and adjoining areas from Dunbartonshire, Bishopbriggs and adjoining areas from Lanarkshire, and the parishes of Baldernock and Campsie from Stirlingshire.

== Demographics ==
East Dunbartonshire council area has low levels of deprivation, with relatively low unemployment and low levels of crime. The population is both declining and ageing.

In a 2007 Reader's Digest poll, East Dunbartonshire was voted the best place in Britain to raise a family. The area has generally performed well in the Halifax Quality of Life survey; in 2010 it was ranked third in Scotland, and it was the only Scottish area in the British Top 20 in 2008. A Legatum Prosperity Index published by the Legatum Institute in October 2016 showed East Dunbartonshire as the most prosperous council area in Scotland and the ninth most prosperous in the United Kingdom.

=== Languages ===
The 2022 Scottish Census reported that out of 106,057 residents aged three and over, 25,685 (24.2%) considered themselves able to speak or read the Scots language.

The 2022 Scottish Census reported that out of 106,061 residents aged three and over, 1,274 (1.2%) considered themselves able to speak or read Gaelic.

== Communities ==
The area is divided into thirteen community council areas, twelve of which have community councils as at 2023 (being those with asterisks in the list below):

- Baldernock*
- Bearsden East*
- Bearsden North*
- Bearsden West*
- Bishopbriggs*
- Campsie*
- Kirkintilloch*
- Lenzie*
- Milngavie*
- Milton of Campsie*
- Torrance*
- Twechar
- Waterside*

== Governance ==
East Dunbartonshire Council Comhairle Siorrachd Dhùn Breatann an Ear

Leadership
- Provost: Gillian Renwick, SNP since 19 May 2022
- Leader: Gordan Low, SNP since 19 May 2022
- Chief Executive: Ann Davie since January 2024

Structure
- Seats: 22 councillors
- Graph of the party split among 22 seats.
- Political groups: Administration (8) SNP (8) Other parties (14) Labour (5) Liberal Democrats (5) Conservative (2) Independent (2)

Elections
- Voting system: Single transferable vote
- Last election: 5 May 2022
- Next election: 6 May 2027

Meeting place
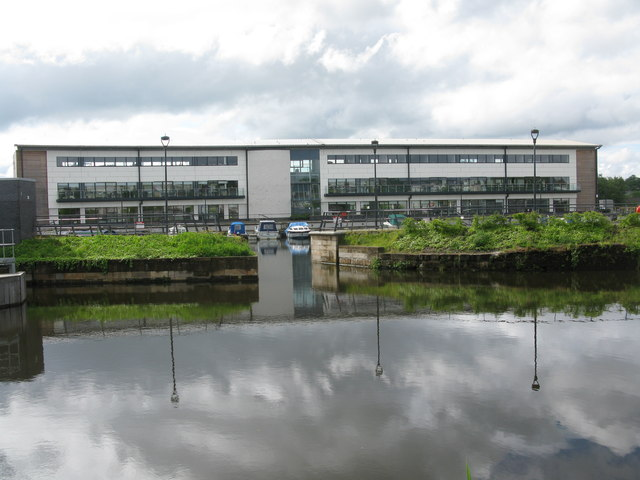
- 12 Strathkelvin Place, Kirkintilloch, G66 1XT

Website
- www.eastdunbarton.gov.uk

=== Political control ===
The council has been under no overall control since 1999. Following the 2022 election a Scottish National Party minority administration formed to run the council.

The first election to East Dunbartonshire Council was held in 1995, initially operating as a shadow authority alongside the outgoing authorities until the new system came into force on 1 April 1996. Political control of the council since 1996 has been as follows:

Party in control	Years
Labour	1996–1999
No overall control	1999–

=== Leadership ===
The role of provost is largely ceremonial in East Dunbartonshire. They chair full council meetings and act as the council's civic figurehead. Political leadership is provided by the leader of the council. The first leader, Charles Kennedy, had been the last leader of the old Strathkelvin District Council. The leaders of East Dunbartonshire Council since 1996 have been:

Councillor	Party	From	To	Notes
Charles Kennedy	Labour	1 Apr 1996	Oct 1999	
Keith Moody	Liberal Democrats	Oct 1999	2003	
John Morrison	Liberal Democrats	8 May 2003	May 2007	
Rhondda Geekie	Labour	17 May 2007	May 2017	
Gordan Low	SNP	23 May 2017	21 Dec 2017	
Vaughan Moody	Liberal Democrats	20 Mar 2018	May 2022	Co-leaders
Andrew Polson	Conservative	20 Mar 2018	May 2022	Co-leaders
Gordan Low	SNP	19 May 2022		

=== Composition ===
Following the 2022 election, and subsequent by-elections and changes of allegiance up to October 2026, the composition of the council was:

Party	Seats
SNP	8
Labour	5
Liberal Democrats	5
Conservative	2
Independent	2
Total	22

The next election is due in 2027.

=== Premises ===
Since 2012 the council has been based at 12 Strathkelvin Place in Kirkintilloch, which forms part of the Southbank Marina development adjoining the Forth and Clyde Canal. Prior to 2012 the council was based at Tom Johnston House at the junction of Lenzie Road and Civic Way in Kirkintilloch. Tom Johnston House had been built in 1985 as the headquarters for the old Strathkelvin District Council and was named after Tom Johnston (1881–1965), who was born in Kirkintilloch and had served as Secretary of State for Scotland during the Second World War. Tom Johnston House was demolished in 2015. The new council chamber at Strathkelvin Place is called Tom Johnston Chamber.

== Elections ==
Since 2007 elections have been held every five years under the single transferable vote system, introduced by the Local Governance (Scotland) Act 2004. Election results since 1995 have been as follows:

Year	Seats	SNP	Liberal Democrats	Labour	Conservative	Independent / Other	Notes
1995	26	0	9	15	2	0	
1999	24	1	10	10	3	0	New ward boundaries.
2003	24	0	12	9	3	0	
2007	24	8	3	6	5	2 (Note: Both East Dunbartonshire Independent Alliance)	New ward boundaries.
2012	24	8	3	8	2	3 (Note: Two being East Dunbartonshire Independent Alliance)	
2017	22	7	6	2	6	1	Source. New ward boundaries.
2022	22	8	6	4	3	1	Source.

=== Wards ===
Map of the area's wards (2017 configuration)

Since 2007, the council (as with all others in Scotland) has been elected using multi-member wards, each returning three councillors using a single transferable vote system of proportional representation. Initially this retained the number of councillors at 24 following on from the same number of single-member wards in previous elections, divided equally across eight wards. However, a national boundary and population review prior to the 2017 Scottish local elections led to the number of East Dunbartonshire wards being reduced to seven and the number of councillors being reduced to 22. These current wards are:

#	Ward Name	Location	Seats	Population (2020)
1	Milngavie		3	13,572
2	Bearsden North		3	14,943
3	Bearsden South		3	13,318
4	Bishopbriggs North and Campsie		4	19,323
5	Bishopbriggs South		3	15,868
6	Kirkintilloch East and North and Twechar		3	18,251
7	Lenzie and Kirkintilloch South		3	13,475

== Settlements ==
The largest settlements in East Dunbartonshire

Largest settlements by population:

Settlement	Population (2020)
Bearsden	28,470
Bishopbriggs	23,680
Kirkintilloch	21,870
Milngavie	12,840
Lenzie	8,090
Lennoxtown	4,260
Milton of Campsie	3,910
Torrance	2,320
Twechar	1,340

== Places of interest ==
- Campsie Fells
- West Highland Way
- Forth and Clyde Canal
- Antonine Wall
- Mugdock Country Park
- Milngavie water treatment works
- River Kelvin
- Lillie Art Gallery
- Auld Kirk Museum
- Huntershill Village
- The Fort Theatre
- The Turret Theatre
- The Gadloch
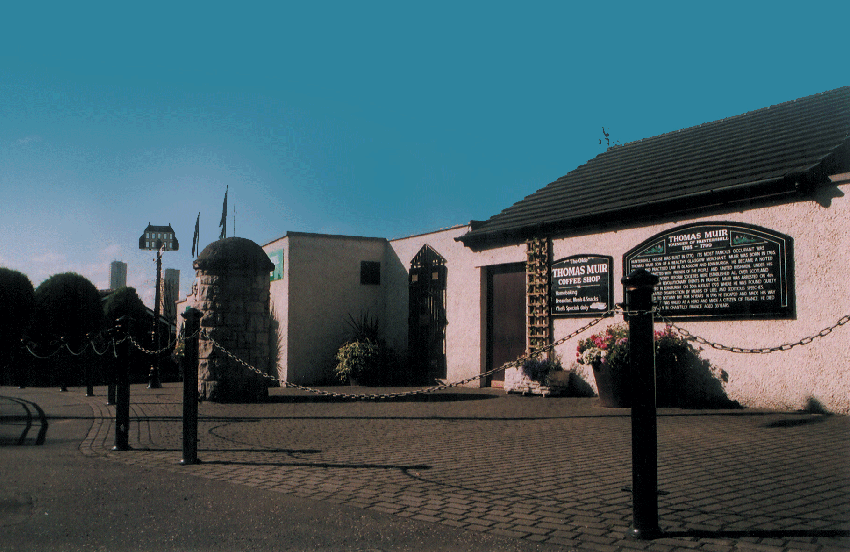
Huntershill Village

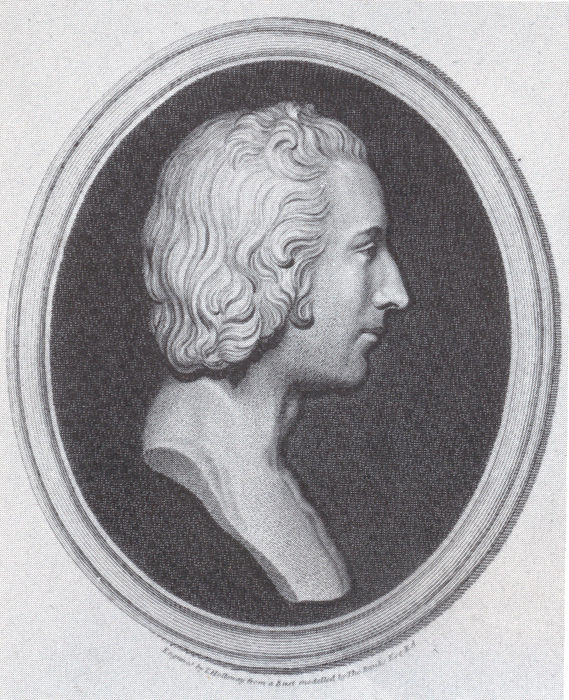
Thomas Muir

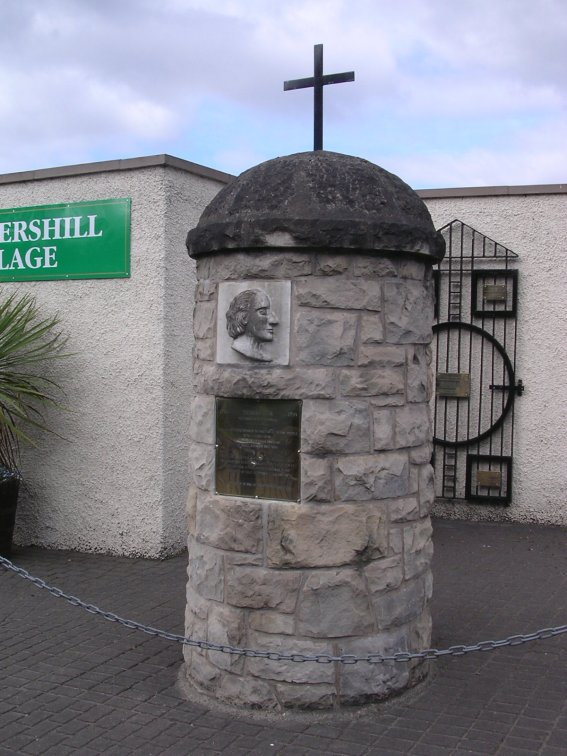
Thomas Muir Cairn - Erected by John SL Watson and unveiled by East Dunbartonshire's Provost John Dempsey (1997)

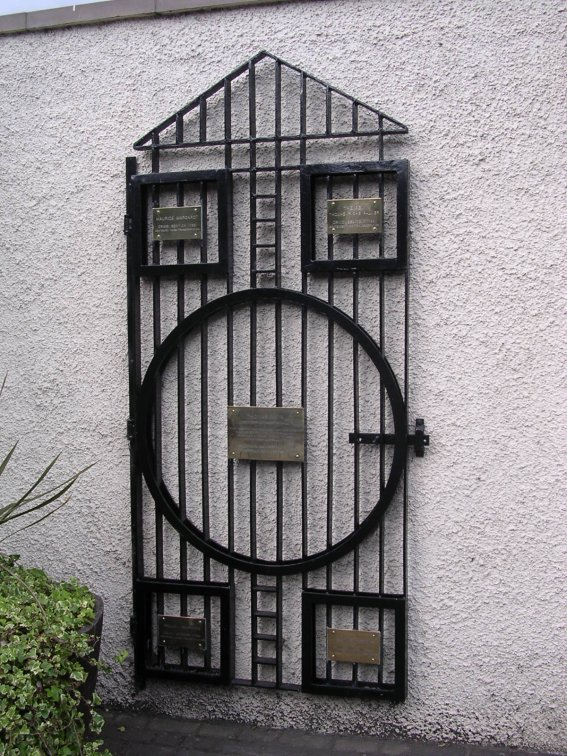
Scottish Political Martyrs Gate - Erected by John SL Watson and unveiled by East Dunbartonshire's Provost John Dempsey (1997)

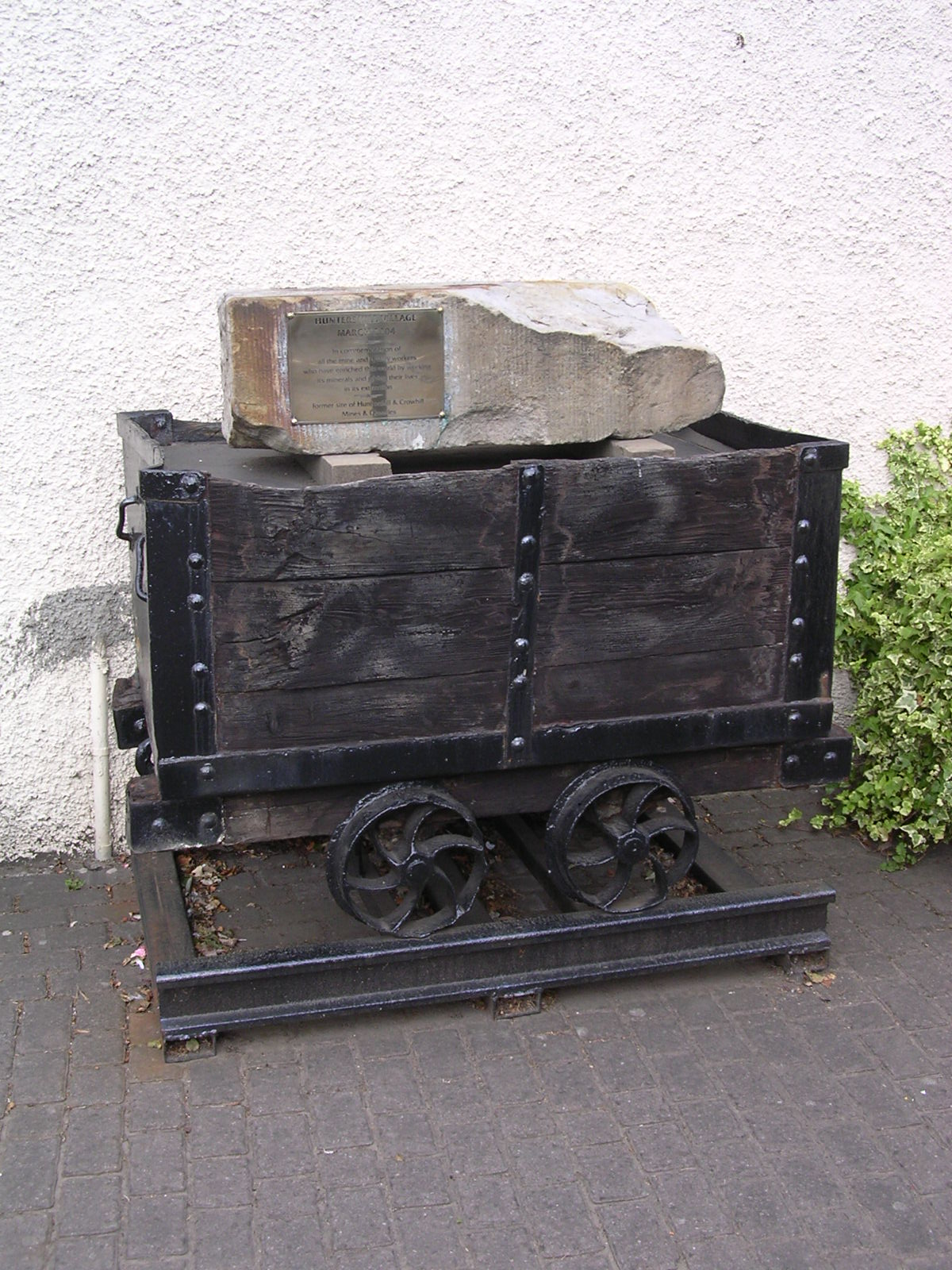
Miners of the world memorial hutch - created by John SL Watson and unveiled by leader of East Dunbartsonshire Council John Morrison (2003)

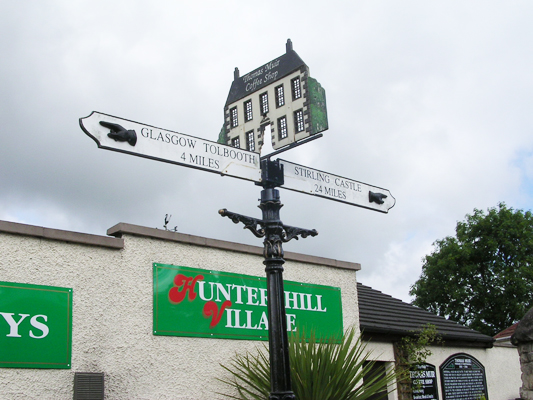
Finger Post marking the Old Glasgow-Stirling postal road

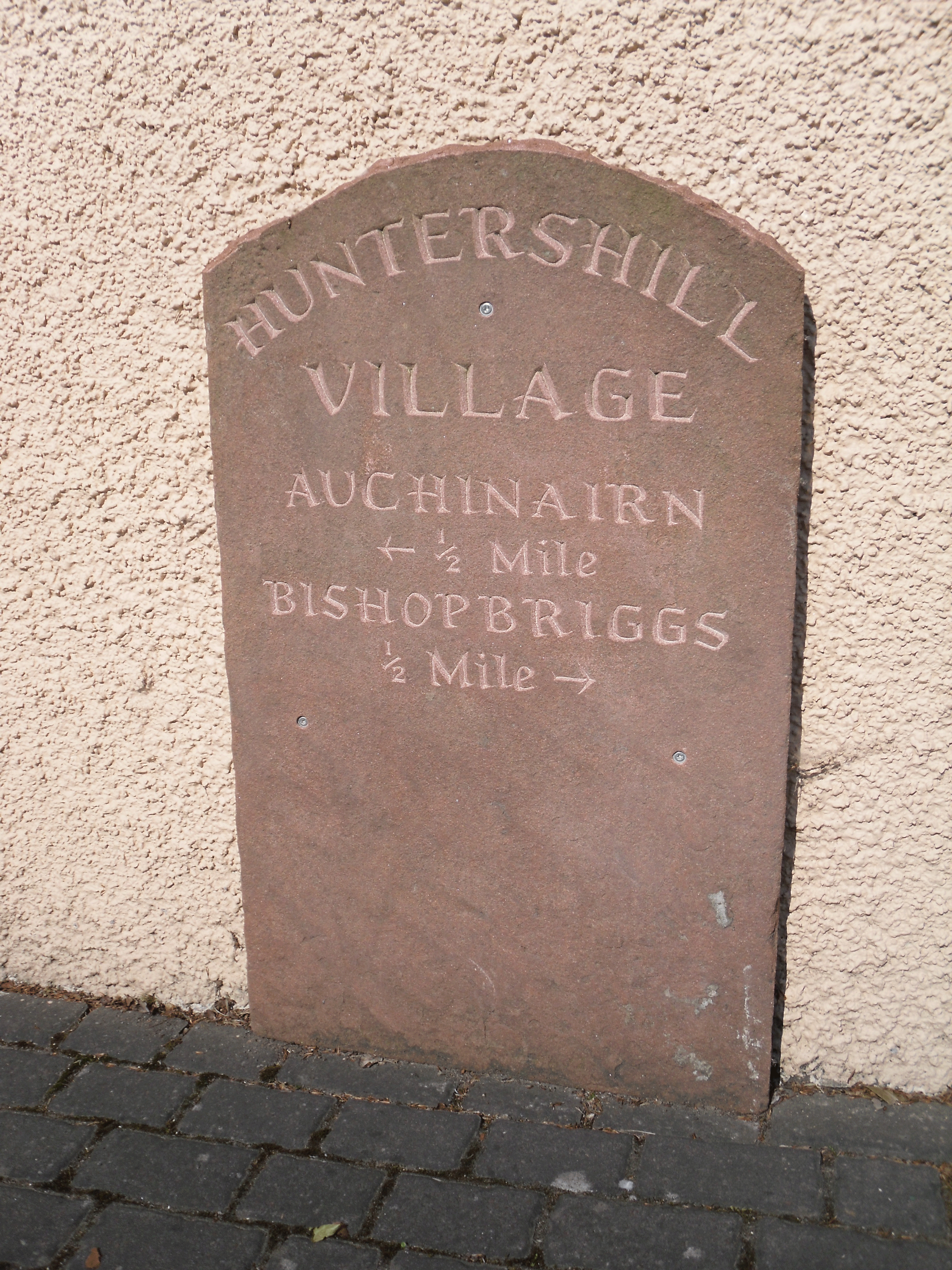
Huntershill Village Mile Stone

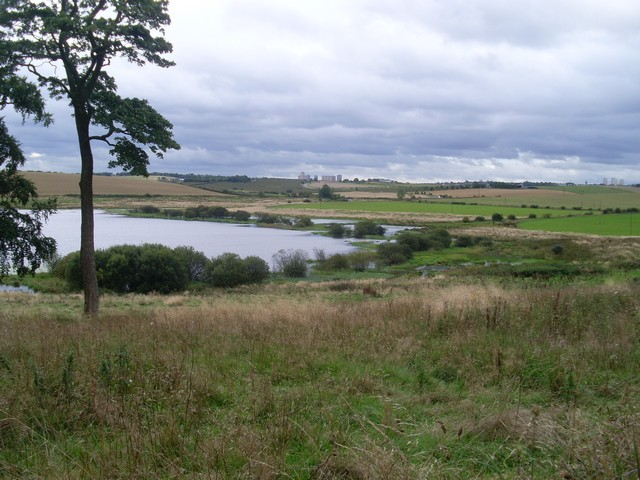
Southwest view across Gadloch Towards the distant Red Road Flats.

== Education ==
There are 8 secondary schools and 33 primary schools in the area. The secondary schools are:

- Bearsden Academy, Bearsden
- Bishopbriggs Academy, Bishopbriggs
- Boclair Academy, Bearsden
- Douglas Academy, Milngavie
- Kirkintilloch High School, Kirkintilloch
- Lenzie Academy, Lenzie
- St Ninian's High School, Kirkintilloch
- Turnbull High School, Bishopbriggs
