= Hen Comb =

Hill in Cumbria, England

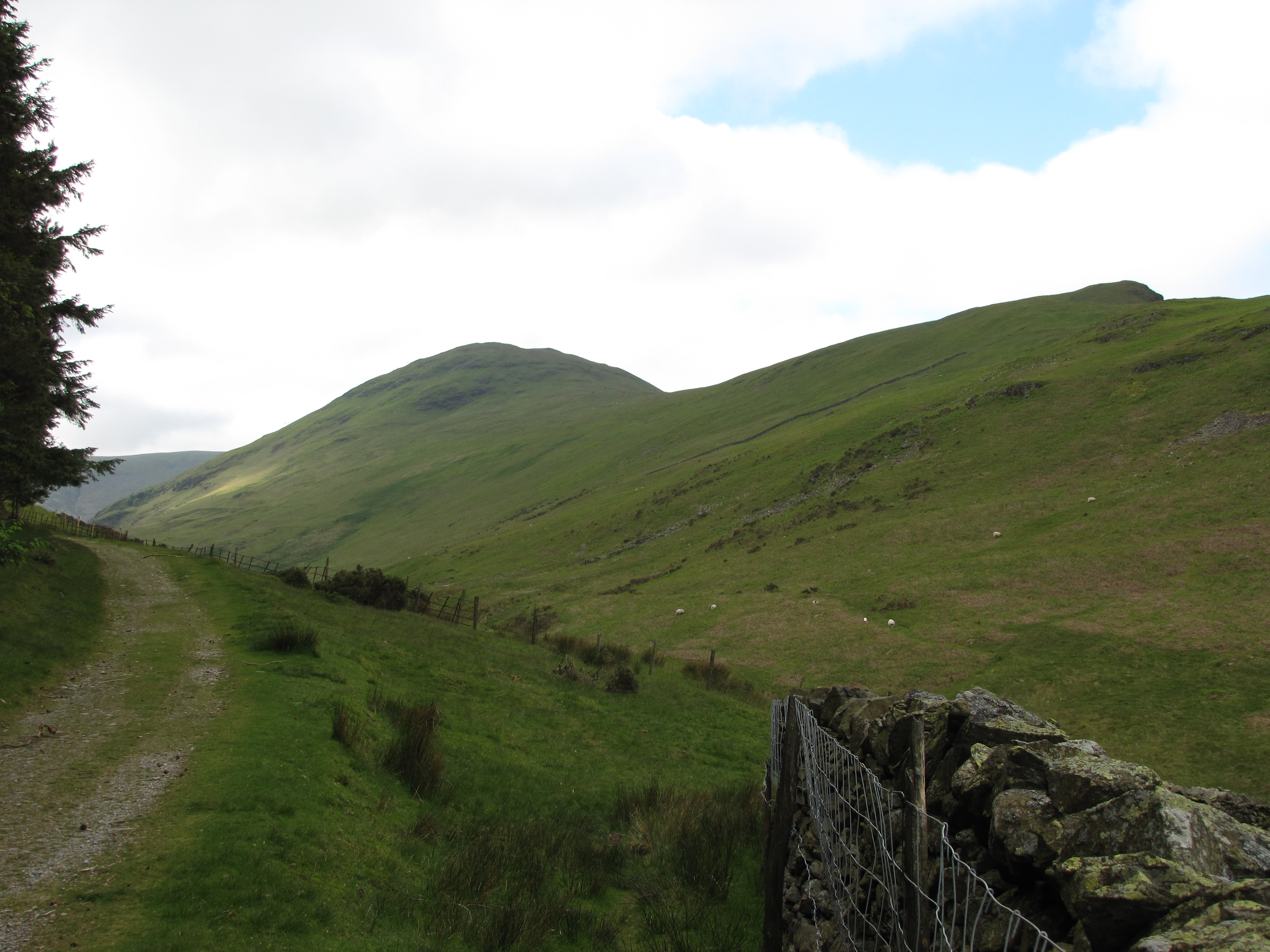
- Seen from the footpath in Mosedale.

Highest point
- Elevation: 509 m (1,670 ft)
- Prominence: c. 145 m (476 ft)
- Listing: Wainwright
- Coordinates: 54°33′04″N 3°20′31″W

Geography
- Location within the Lake District Location within the former Allerdale Borough
- Location: Cumbria, England
- Parent range: Lake District, Western Fells
- OS grid: NY133181
- Topo map: OS Landranger 89, 90, Explorer OL4

Hen Comb is a fell in the west of the English Lake District. One of the Loweswater Fells it lies to the south of Loweswater lake and Loweswater village. Although of only moderate height, its ascent can be difficult as it is largely surrounded by bogs.

== Topography ==
The Western Fells occupy a triangular sector of the Lake District, bordered by the River Cocker to the north east and Wasdale to the south east. Westwards the hills diminish toward the coastal plain of Cumberland. At the central hub of the high country are Great Gable and its satellites, while two principal ridges fan out on either flank of Ennerdale, the western fells in effect being a great horseshoe around this long wild valley. Hen Comb and the other Loweswater Fells form the extremity of the northern arm.

The Loweswater Fells have been compared to the digits of a hand, radiating out south westward from the "palm" centred on Loweswater village. From the west these are Burnbank Fell, Blake Fell, Gavel Fell, Hen Comb and Mellbreak, the "thumb".

Hen Comb is a linear ridge, beginning in the fields of the Loweswater valley and climbing away southwards. The initial ascent is crowned by the subsidiary top of Little Dodd (1,187 ft), before the ridge flattens out for a quarter of a mile. Beyond is the final climb to the rounded dome of the summit, which has steep slopes on all sides. There is a connecting depression on the south west flank which leads to Floutern Cop, an outlier of Gavel Fell.

Hen Comb has no direct topographical link with Mellbreak to the east, the two parallel ridges being separated by the wet valley of Mosedale. The head of Mosedale curves westward around the summit of Hen Comb, its source being at Floutern Tarn. This long slender pool has a grim quality in most conditions, being sandwiched between Floutern Crag and an embankment of giant boulders. Great Borne and Starling Dodd rise to the south. The western boundary of the fell is formed by Whiteoak Beck which, like Mosedale Beck, joins the outflow of Loweswater. Across the valley are Gavel Fell and Blake Fell, while its marshy source at Whiteoak Moss lies just below Floutern Cop.

== Geology ==
The rocks of Hen Comb are of the Kirkstile Formation, laminated mudstone and siltstone, often associated with the Skiddaw group.

Whiteoak Mine operated on the north western slopes, lead being won from a series of workings between 1864 and 1891. The pit for a 40 ft waterwheel can still be seen. Mosedale Mine on the eastern flanks was a less successful trial, also for lead. There are also the remains of an iron mine near the outlet of Floutern Tarn, worked patchily through the 1860s.

== Summit ==
A cairn atop the grassy dome marks the summit, from which a respectable view can be seen. The Buttermere valley is a highpoint with the Grasmoor range beyond. Both arms of the Western Fells are also seen to good effect.

== Ascents ==
The obvious line is from Loweswater village, ascending Mosedale. An early crossing of the river (wide, no bridge) allows Little Dodd to be climbed. Further travel through the swamps of Mosedale or Whiteoak Moss can lead more directly to the summit, but rarely dryshod. Not for nothing does Wainwright remark on Hen Comb as "rising...between side valleys that carry streams down from a wide upland morass, a desolate tract of marshland and bog encircling the extremity of the fell like a moat, out of which rise the summit slopes as an island from the sea."
