= Seat (Buttermere) =

Coordinates: 54.5093°N 3.2587°W

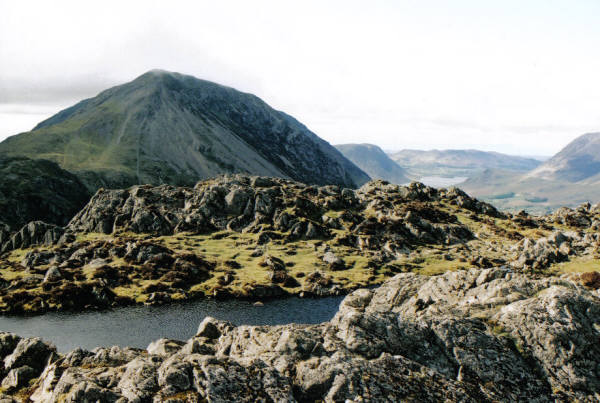
- Seat (middle left) from the summit tarn on Haystacks

Highest point
- Elevation: 561 m (1,841 ft)
- Listing: Leaney Birkett

Geography
- Location: Cumbria, England
- Parent range: Lake District, North-Western Fells
- OS grid: NY186134
- Topo map: OS Explorer OL4

Seat or Seat (Buttermere) is a minor Fell in the English Lake District. It has a height of 561 m (1840 ft). Seat is overshadowed by Haystacks and High Crag. Its location is on the south-western corner of Buttermere in the North Western Fells.

== Topography ==
Seat is cushioned in between Haystacks and High Crag in the North Western Fells. Seat has an abundance of small Crags and the summit is reasonably flat. At the bottom of Seat is Buttermere, which was once joined with Crummock Water to the north. On the western side of Seat is Ennerdale Forest in the Ennerdale Valley. Seat's neighboring mountains include Fleetwith Pike, Haystacks, High Crag, High Stile, Red Pike and Dodd. Beyond Seat to the north-west the land diminishes towards the coastal plain of Cumberland.

== Ascents ==
The ascent favoured by many is from the south-eastern corner of Buttermere, From Gatesgarth Farm, across the road from the Farm Car park and out towards the ascent at the bottom of Haystacks. Haystacks would commonly be the first port of call with options to go north towards Seat and High Crag then High Stile, Red Pike, Dodd and then back alongside the lake back to the Farm, or south towards Fleetwith Pike. The other main ascent is the opposite, starting at the north of the lake from the village of Buttermere and up to Red Pike then to High Stile, High Crag, then finally onto Seat and Haystacks. Other ascents which are less common include the ascent via Scarth Gap from Ennerdale Forest.

== Summit and View ==
Seat has two summits; a Southern and the Northern, with the Northern Summit being the true summit. The summit cairn is on the top of a small crag. The cairn is a collection of rocks and a bit of rusted metal on top. From the summit, High Crag can immediately be seen to the north, and Haystacks to the South, the view to the East is of Buttermere valley and to the west Ennerdale Forest and valley.
