= Starling Dodd =

Hill in Cumbria, England

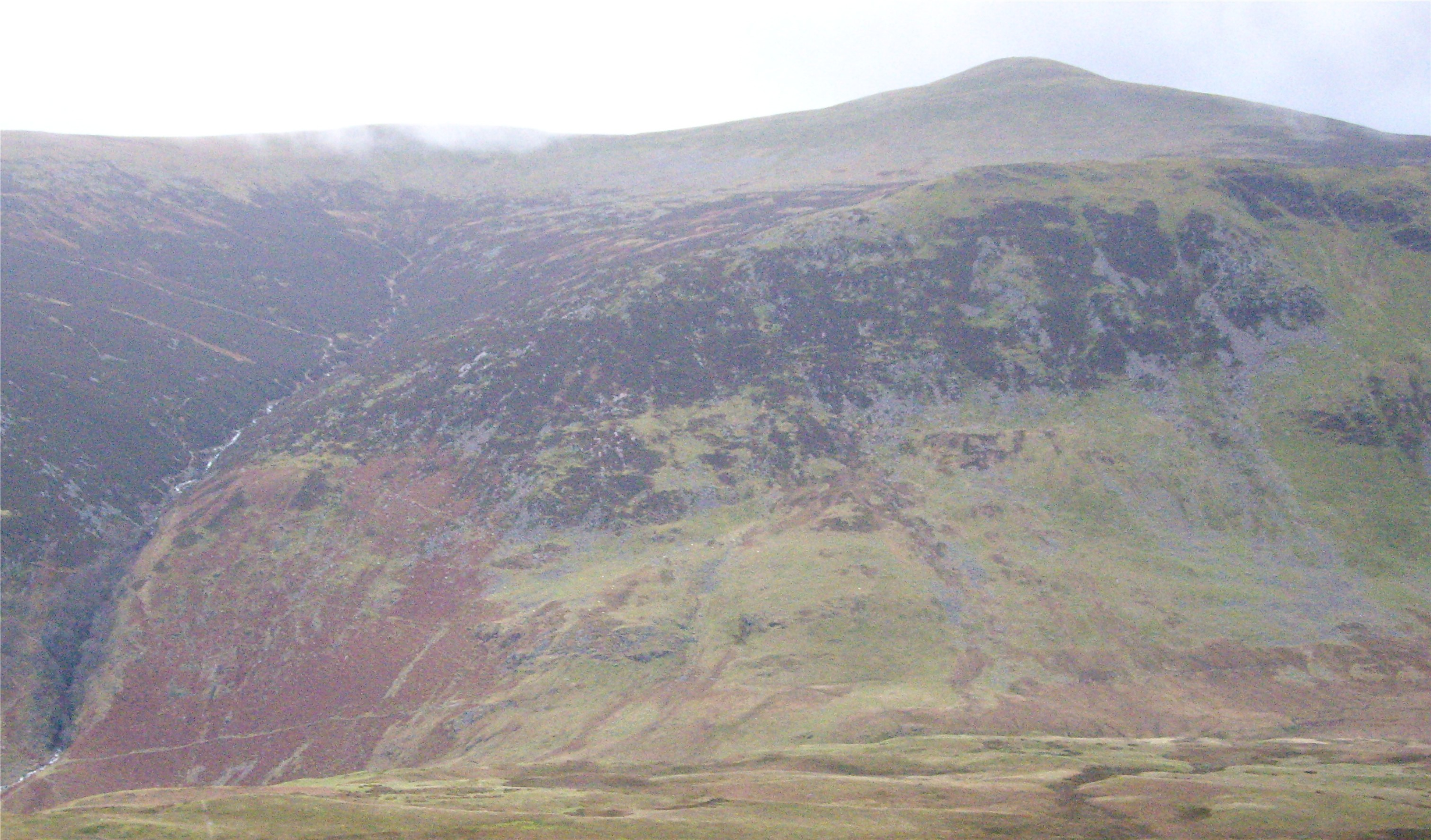
- Starling Dodd, with Scale Force on the left, seen from Mellbreak.

Highest point
- Elevation: 633 m (2,077 ft)
- Prominence: 60 m (197 ft)
- Listing: Wainwright, Hewitt, Nuttall
- Coordinates: 54°31′49″N 3°19′38″W

Geography
- Location within the Lake District Location within the former Allerdale Borough Location within the former Borough of Copeland
- Location: Cumbria, England
- Parent range: Lake District, Western Fells
- OS grid: NY142158
- Topo map: OS Landranger 89, Explorer OL4

Starling Dodd is a fell in the western part of the English Lake District, located between the valleys of Ennerdale and Buttermere, on the ridge between Great Borne to its west and Red Pike to its east. Not visible from Buttermere and rounded in profile, Starling Dodd is a relatively unfrequented top.

== Topography ==
The Western Fells occupy a triangular sector of the Lake District, bordered by the River Cocker to the north east and Wasdale to the south east. Westwards the hills diminish toward the coastal plain of Cumberland. At the central hub of the high country are Great Gable and its satellites, while two principal ridges fan out on either flank of Ennerdale, the western fells in effect being a great horseshoe around this long wild valley. Starling Dodd stands on the northern branch, dividing Buttermere and Ennerdale.

The Buttermere–Ennerdale watershed runs north-west from Haystacks, climbing over High Crag, High Stile and Red Pike, the three fells of Buttermere Edge. The ridge then loses its craggy character, swinging westerly over the grassy Starling Dodd to its terminus at Great Borne.

The western ridge of Red Pike swings down, away from the craggy Buttermere front of Ling Cove, and then rises to the subsidiary top of Little Dodd, 1,935 ft (590 m). This is generally considered to be a part of Red Pike, the territory of Starling Dodd beginning at the next depression westward. A short climb on grass then leads to the summit, a rounded, but quite shapely grassy dome sitting atop a broad ridge. Gentle slopes fall westward along the watershed, interrupted only by the slight rise of Gale Fell, 1,699 ft (518 m), a trivial summit listed only by Birkett. Rough grass on the facing slope leads up to the rockier environs of Great Borne.

The southern flanks of Starling Dodd are heavily wooded below 1,000 ft (300 m), part of the extensive conifer plantations of the Ennerdale Forest. Within the forest is Latterbarrow, 895 ft (273 m), a parallel lower ridge which diverts some of Starling Dodd's streams further west than might be expected. North of the summit dome, Starling Dodd levels into a wide plateau before disappearing over a steep rim of minor crags. At the base of this fall is the tenuous topographical connection to Mellbreak, a low watershed dividing Starling Dodd's northern drainage into widely differing catchments. That to the west of the summit flows into the marshy valley of Mosedale, travelling all around Mellbreak to enter Crummock Water via Park Beck. The north-eastern quarter takes a direct line into the lake, dropping down the craggy face via Scale Force. This is believed to be the highest single waterfall in the District, dropping around 170 ft (50 m) down a narrow cleft.

== Geology ==
The summit of Starling Dodd is formed by rocks of the Buttermere Formation, an olistostrome of disrupted, sheared and folded mudstone, siltstone and sandstone. Surrounding it on almost all sides are the granophyric granites of the Ennerdale Intrusion.

The steep northern slopes were the site of iron mines, operated in the late nineteenth century. One of the levels can still be found near the foot of Scale Force. All work had ceased by 1877.

== Summit ==
The smooth grassy top once featured a sizeable cairn, reinforced by many iron posts and fittings salvaged from the Ennerdale Fence. In recent years the posts have been removed from the stone cairn and an entirely metal cairn, looking like something out of the Tate Modern, has been constructed beside the original cairn.

Ennerdale Water is well seen from the summit, with parts of the lakes of Crummock Water and Loweswater also visible. High Stile hides part of the arc of the Western Fells, but Pillar and its neighbours make a fine panorama. The North Western Fells are also seen across Crummock Water.

== Ascents ==
Loweswater village can be used as a base, although this then requires a full traverse of marshy Mosedale. Red Gill can then be followed to reach the plateau. The same point can also be reached from Buttermere village or Ennerdale by using Floutern Pass. This is not without bogs either. Indirect ascents along the ridge from either direction are probably more common.

== Wainwright's Pictorial Guides ==
In his concluding notes in the seventh and final volume of the Pictorial Guides to the Lakeland Fells, Wainwright wrote that Starling Dodd was the final fell he climbed during his research for the books. As such, some Wainwright-baggers save Starling Dodd to be their last Wainwright fell in honour of this.
