= Red Pike (Buttermere) =

Mountain in the English Lake District, Cumbria, England

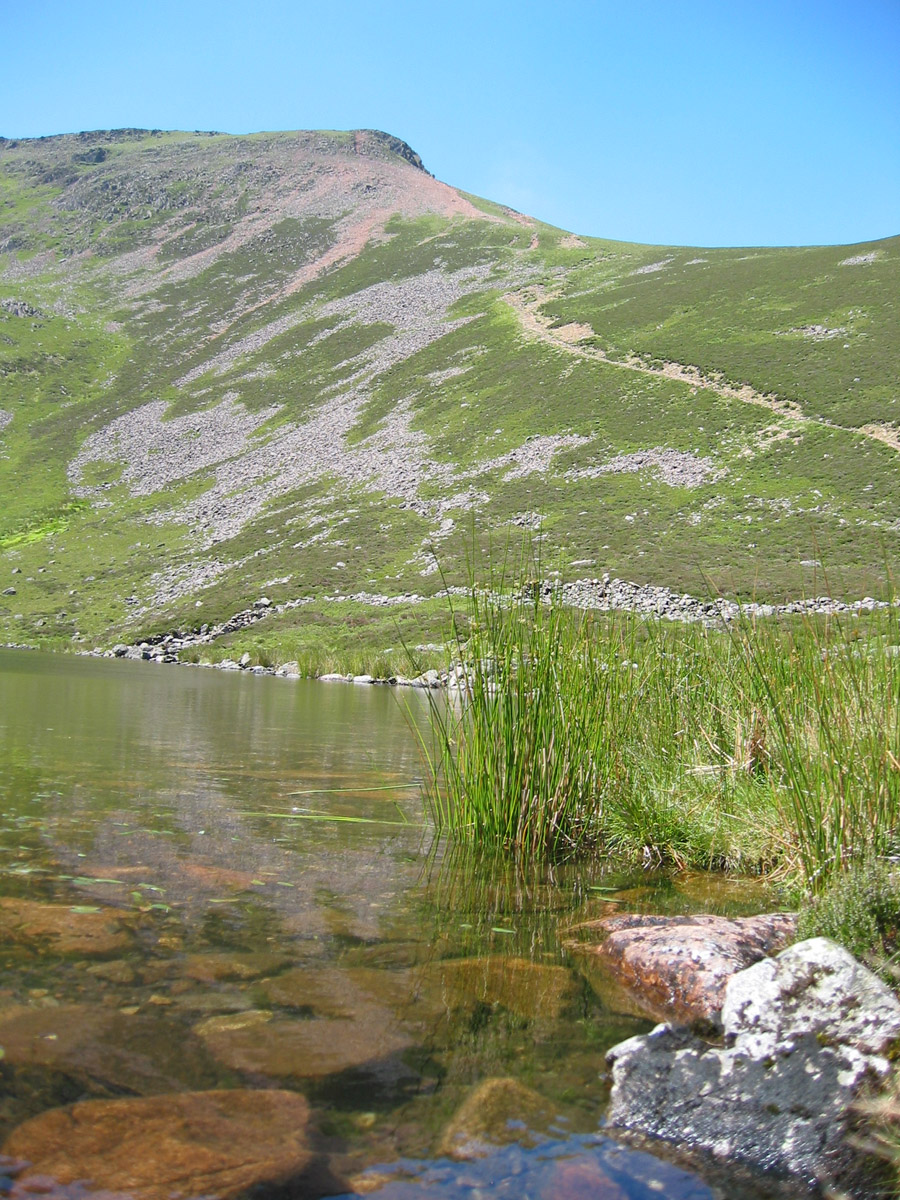
- Red Pike from Bleaberry Tarn

Highest point
- Elevation: 755 m (2,477 ft)
- Prominence: c. 40 m
- Listing: Wainwright, Nuttall, Hewitt
- Coordinates: 54°31′34″N 3°18′00″W

Geography
- Location within the Lake District Location within the former Allerdale Borough Location within the former Borough of Copeland Location within England
- Location: Cumbria, England
- Parent range: Lake District, Western Fells
- OS grid: NY160154
- Topo map: OS Landranger 89, Explorer OL4

Listed summits of Red Pike (Buttermere)
Name	Grid ref	Height	Status
Dodd	NY163157	641 m (2,103 ft)	Nuttall

Red Pike is a fell in the High Stile range in the western English Lake District, which separates Ennerdale from the valley of Buttermere and Crummock Water. It is 2,476 ft (755 m) high. The direct ascent of Red Pike from Buttermere is very popular and the ridge walk from Red Pike to Haystacks is regarded as one of the finest in the area, with excellent views of the Scafells, Great Gable and Pillar.

The fell can be confused with Red Pike (Wasdale), which is only three miles (five kilometres) away but cannot be seen from the summit. Alfred Wainwright in his guidebook The Western Fells comments that the Wasdale Red Pike might be higher but is less suited to the name. Red Pike in Buttermere is given its rich red colouring by the presence of syenite in the rock and subsoil of the fell. This is particularly marked in places where surface erosion has occurred (notably the stony track by the side of Scale Force and the path from Bleaberry Tarn to the summit) and the red colouring of the paths can be seen from some distance.

== Topography ==
The Western Fells occupy a triangular sector of the Lake District, bordered by the River Cocker to the north east and Wasdale to the south east. Westwards the hills diminish toward the coastal plain of Cumberland. At the central hub of the high country are Great Gable and its satellites, while two principal ridges fan out on either flank of Ennerdale, the western fells in effect being a great horseshoe around this long wild valley. The highest section of the northern branch is formed by the trio of Buttermere fells, High Crag, High Stile and Red Pike.

The Buttermere Fells, also known as Buttermere Edge, form the watershed between Buttermere and Upper Ennerdale. The Ennerdale flanks are steep and rough with areas of crag, the lower slopes being planted with a ribbon of conifers. Across the narrow ridge-top to the north are deep corries and dark walls of crag, glowering down over the lake. The ridge continues south east to Haystacks and the Great Gable group. Beyond Red Pike to the west are Starling Dodd, Great Borne and the Loweswater Fells.

All three Buttermere Fells throw out a short spur towards the lake with deep combs hollowed out between them. Between Red Pike and High Stile is Bleaberry Comb, backed by Chapel Crags. Nestled deep within is Bleaberry Tarn, a pool which is in continual shadow from November to March. Despite the steep contours of the rock walls above, the tarn is only about 15 ft (4.6 m) deep, and is well stocked with trout. Bleaberry Tarn is drained into Buttermere by Sourmilk Gill, reaching the lake mere yards from its outlet. A belt of trees has been planted along the shoreline. Of the three Buttermere Fells, only Red Pike's north east ridge ends in a prominent top with sufficient relative height to be listed as a Nuttall in its own right. This is Dodd, and the ridge connecting it to Red Pike is the Saddle.

The ongoing Ennerdale watershed continues westwards from Red Pike, losings its rocky character to become a broad grassy ridge. Little Dodd (1,935 feet; 590 m) is crossed first, before the grassy dome of Starling Dodd is reached. Red Pike also throws out a northern ridge on this flank, descending via Lincomb edge toward Crummock Water, the final drop being over Blea Crag. Between Lingcomb Edge and Dodd is Ling Comb, the third corrie on the Buttermere flank of these fells, standing opposite the village. Behind Lingcomb Edge, separating Red Pike from Starling Dodd, is the valley of Scale Beck. This includes Scale Force, Lakeland's longest single drop waterfall at around 100 ft (30 m). The Ennerdale slopes are steep, cut by the valley of Gillflinter Beck. There are small areas of crag.

== Geology ==
Red Pike is formed predominantly by the granophyric granite of the Ennerdale intrusion.

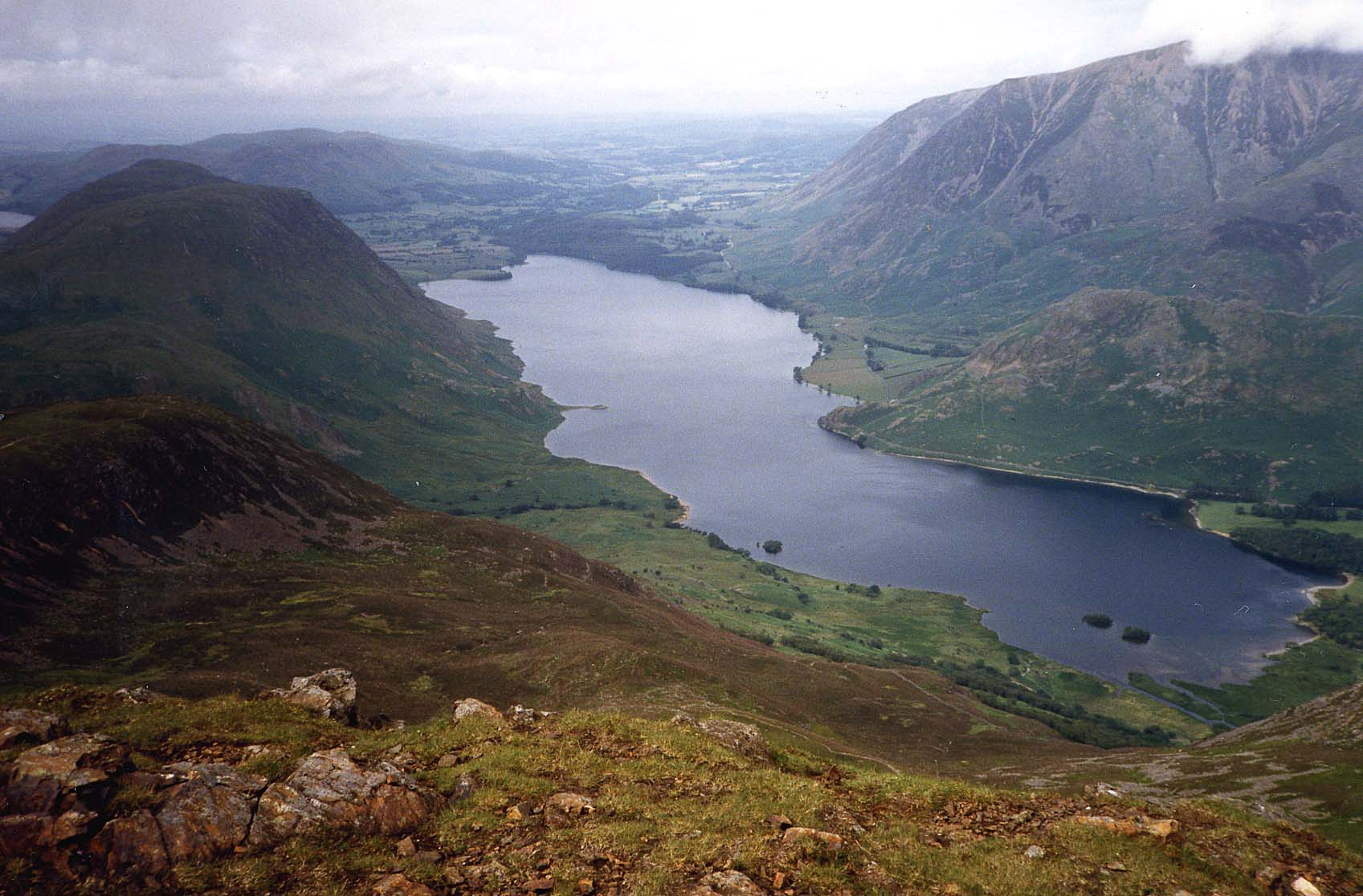
Crummock Water from Red Pike summit

== Summit ==
The prominent curve of the summit stands out at the head of The Saddle, appearing quite magnificent from Crummock when High Stile is hidden. Top is shear on three sides, but well grassed and bears a large cairn. Red Pike is unusual for the number of lakes in view- Derwentwater, Buttermere, Crummock Water, Ennerdale Water and Loweswater are all on display. Other highlights include Pillar Rock, Grasmoor and the close-up view of Chapel Crags.

== Ascents ==
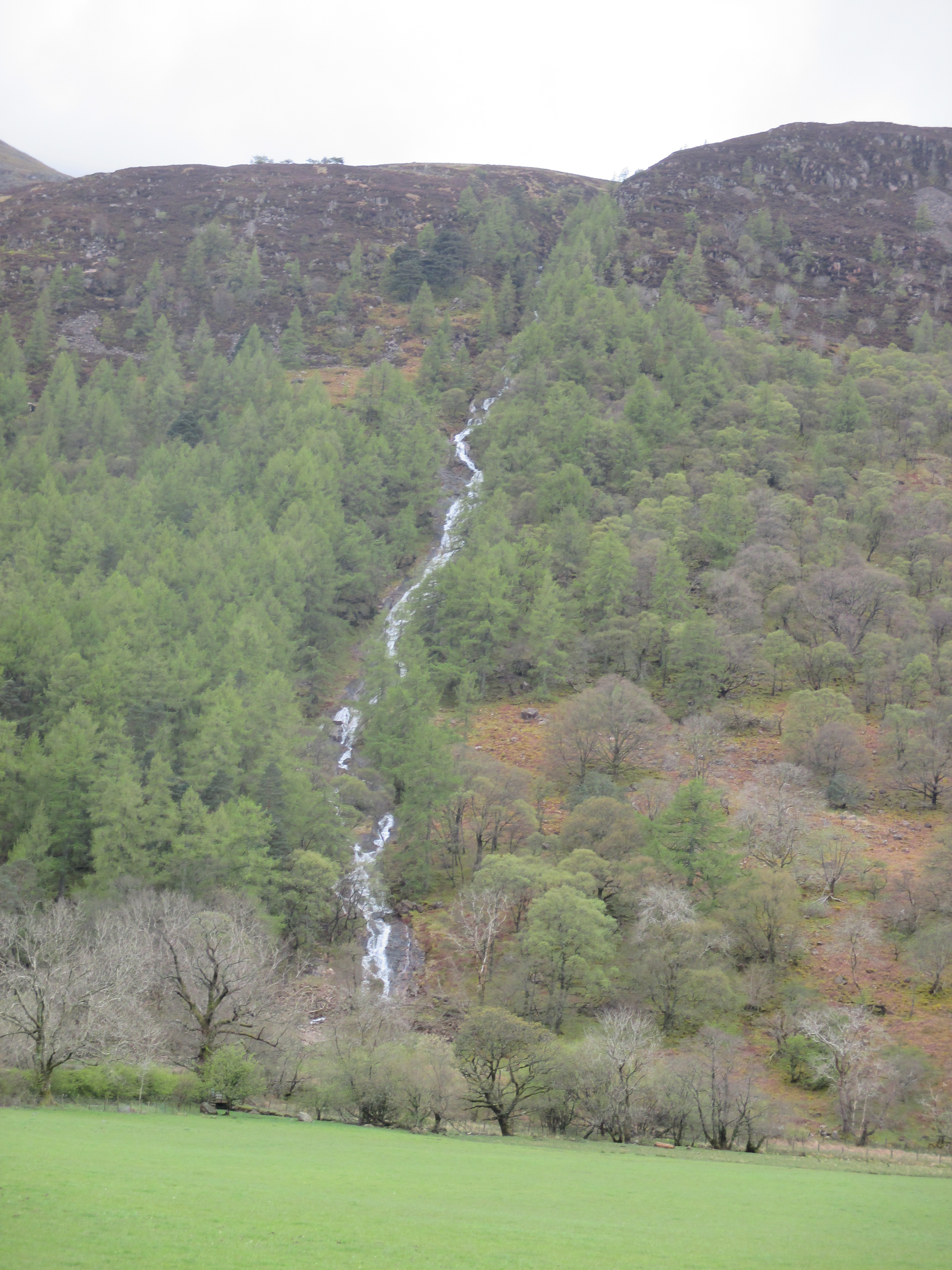
Sour Milk Gill, flowing from Red Pike

A variety of routes can be followed from Buttermere. Sour Milk Gill leads almost direct from the village into Bleaberry Comb, from where The Saddle can be gained. Alternatively the path to Scale Force can be used at the start. Climbing beside the fall itself leads to the reverse slope of Lincomb Edge, or an earlier turn up Far Ruddy Beck gives access into Ling Comb. From Ennerdale, the only break in the trees on the northern side is followed by a path up Gillflinter Beck. This leads onward to the summit, the only access on the Ennerdale side of Buttermere Edge. Many walkers will combine Red Pike, High Stile and High Crag in a single outing from Buttermere or Gatesgarth.
