= Gavel Fell =

Hill in the western part of the English Lake District

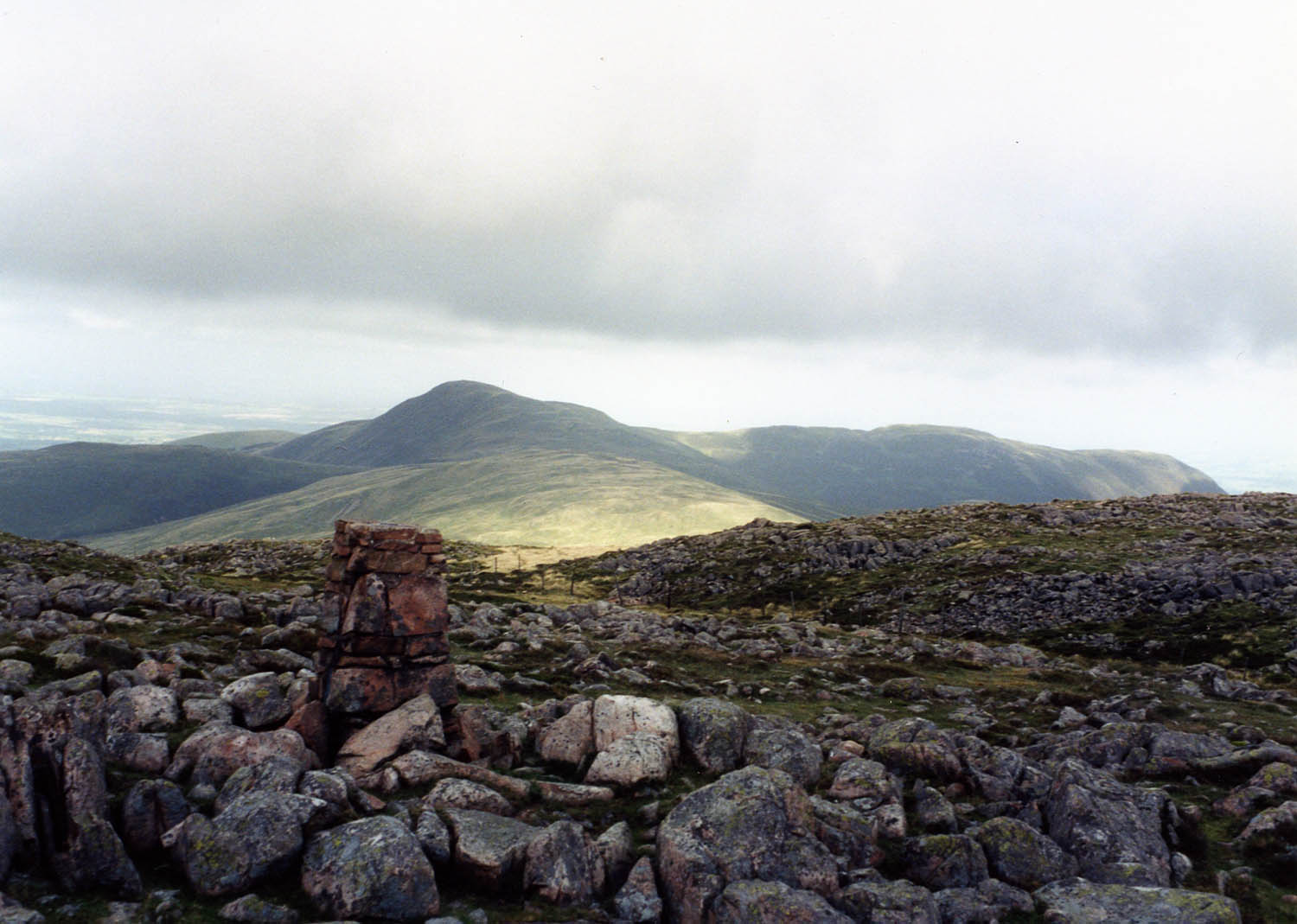
- Gavel Fell seen from Great Borne, 2.5 km to the SE

Highest point
- Elevation: 526 m (1,726 ft)
- Prominence: c. 75 m (250 ft)
- Parent peak: Blake Fell
- Listing: Wainwright
- Coordinates: 54°33′11″N 3°22′05″W

Geography
- Location within the Lake District Location within the former Borough of Copeland
- Location: Cumbria, England
- Parent range: Lake District, Western Fells
- OS grid: NY117184
- Topo map: OS Landranger 89, 90, Explorer OL4

Gavel Fell is a hill in the English Lake District. Centremost of the five Loweswater Fells in the western part of the District, it stands between Hen Comb and Blake Fell. Of moderate altitude it can be climbed from Loweswater village, or from Croasdale to the west.

== Topography ==
The Western Fells occupy a triangular sector of the Lake District, bordered by the River Cocker to the north east and Wasdale to the south east. Westwards the hills diminish toward the coastal plain of Cumberland. At the central hub of the high country are Great Gable and its satellites, while two principal ridges fan out on either flank of Ennerdale, the western fells in effect being a great horseshoe around this long wild valley. Gavel Fell and the other Loweswater Fells form the extremity of the northern arm.

The Loweswater Fells have been compared to the digits of a hand, radiating out south westward from the "palm" centred on Loweswater village. From the west these are Burnbank Fell, Blake Fell, Gavel Fell, Hen Comb and Mellbreak, the "thumb".

Gavel Fell being the "middle finger" has a long ridge running south west from the valley. This rises gently at first past High Nook farm, before accelerating its climb up the face of Black Crag to the summit plateau. A subsidiary top at 1,601 ft (488 m) is reached first, unnamed on Ordnance Survey maps but referred to as High Nook in some guidebooks. The ridge widens, damply, and turns south at the summit, dropping over a rough patch of ground named White Oak. Beyond is Banna Fell, 1,496 ft (456 m), which could lay claim to separate status but is generally considered a subsidiary of Gavel Fell. Banna Fell has a very prominent eastern top named Floutern Cop, 1,480 ft (450 m).

On the Loweswater side Gavel Fell is neatly contained by Highnook Beck to the north west and Whiteoak Beck to the east. These merge beneath the nose of the ridge at High Nook Farm, before joining Dub Beck, the outflow of Loweswater. One of the feeders of Highnook Beck is High Nook Tarn, a small pool with a low earth dam. Tarns are unusual in this part of the District, although Gavel Fell has a share in a second on its southern boundary. This is Floutern Tarn, lying beneath Floutern Cop. A long brooding pool with a depth of about 12 ft (4 m), Floutern Tarn drains east and then north into the morass of Mosedale. A walker's pass, Floutern Tarn Pass, crosses beside Floutern, providing access from Buttermere to Ennerdale. The western side follows Gill Beck, the southern boundary of Gavel Fell. The western face of the fell is drained by Croasdale Beck, a tributary of the Ehen.

== Geology ==
Gavel Fell is formed from rocks of the Kirk Stile Formation, commonly associated with the Skiddaw range. These consist of laminated mudstone and siltstone.

Whiteoak Lead Mine consisted of several levels and a shaft, operating between 1864 and 1891. This was worked on both flanks of Whiteoak Gill, but failed to achieve commercial success. There are also the remains of an iron mine near the outlet of Floutern Tarn, worked patchily through the 1860s.

== Summit ==
The highest point is marked by a large cairn on a grassy plateau. The view seawards is blocked in part by Blake Fell, but there is a fine array of fells eastward. The Grasmoor group form the highlight.

== Ascents ==
From Loweswater a start can be made up the track to High Nook farm. At the tarn, the walker can turn to either flank of the ridge to pass Black Crag, before making for the summit. From Croasdale the west ridge of Banna Fell can be used, although entailing a roundabout route, as walkers are no longer welcome to use the more direct line up Croasdale Beck to White Oak (this route has now been omitted from the revised edition of Wainwright's guide to the Western Fells). Ascents via Floutern Pass can also be soured by the attitude of the landowner, who covets every last blade of grass.
