= Burnbank Fell =

Hill in Cumbria, England

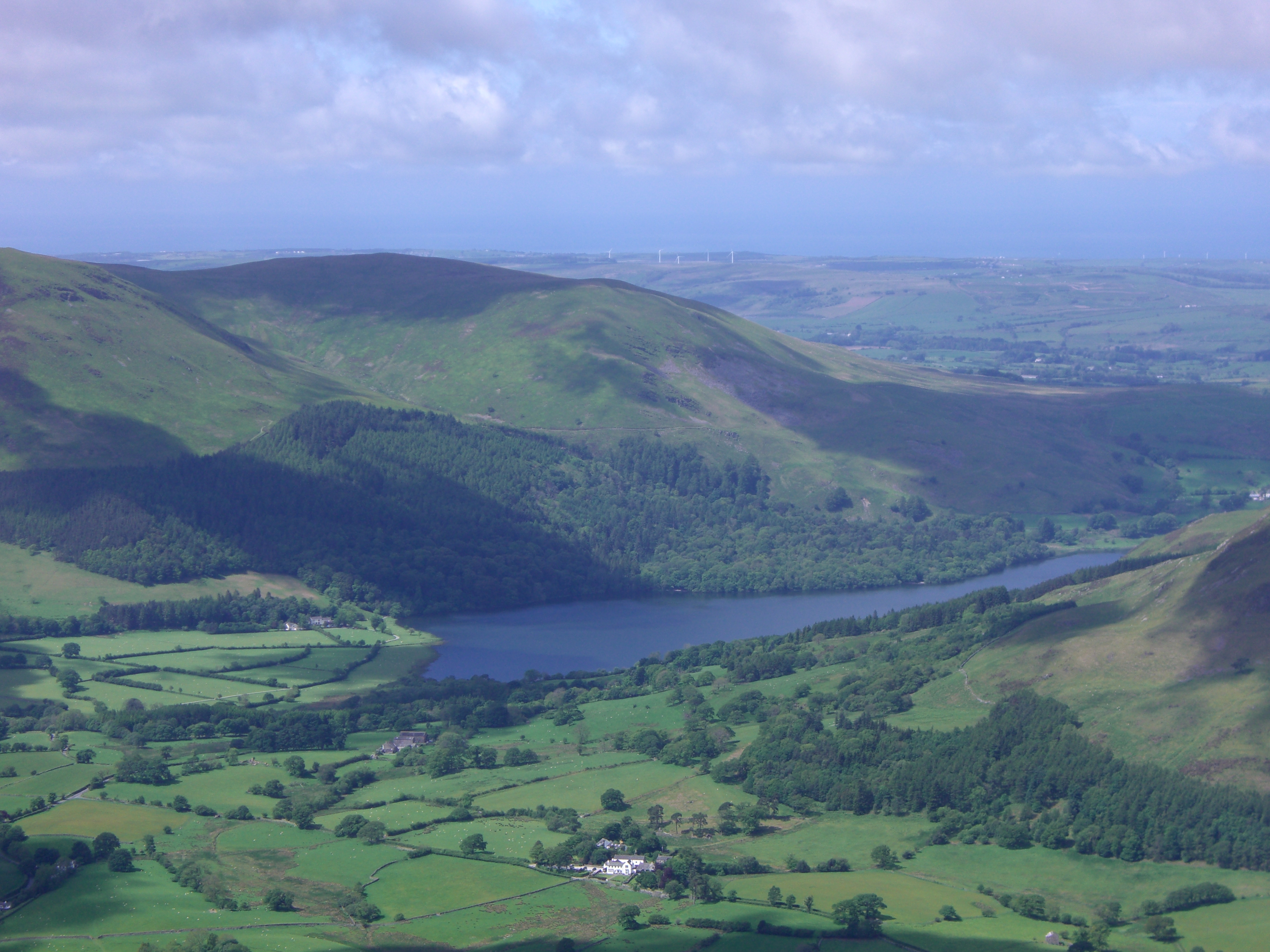
- Seen across Loweswater from the fell of Whiteside, 8 km to the east.

Highest point
- Elevation: 475 m (1,558 ft)
- Prominence: c. 20 m
- Parent peak: Blake Fell
- Listing: Wainwright
- Coordinates: 54°34′30″N 3°22′30″W

Geography
- Location within the Lake District Location within the former Allerdale Borough Location within the former Borough of Copeland
- Location: Cumbria, England
- Parent range: Lake District, Western Fells
- OS grid: NY110209
- Topo map: OS Landranger 89, 90, Explorer OL4

Burnbank Fell is a small hill in the west of the English Lake District. It is the most westerly of the Loweswater Fells, a group of low grassy hills just south of Loweswater. It is predominantly grassy, with sprawling flanks and a broad ridge connecting it to Blake Fell. It can be climbed from Lamplugh in the west, or from Waterend on the lakeshore.

== Topography ==
The Western Fells occupy a triangular sector of the Lake District, bordered by the River Cocker to the northeast and Wasdale to the southeast. To the west, the hills diminish toward the coastal plain of Cumberland. At the central hub of the high country are Great Gable and its satellites, while two principal ridges fan out on either flank of Ennerdale—the western fells being, in effect, a great horseshoe around this long wild valley. Burnbank Fell and the other Loweswater Fells form the extremity of the northern arm.

The Loweswater Fells have been compared to the digits of a hand, radiating out southwestward from the "palm" centred on Loweswater village. From the west, these are Burnbank Fell, Blake Fell, Gavel Fell, Hen Comb and Mellbreak, the "thumb".

Burnbank Fell marks the northwestern perimeter of the Lakeland Fells, its feet set on the boundary of the National Park. Beyond lie the valley of the River Marrom and the industrial towns of the coastal plain. Beyond the park boundary is the low double top of Mockerkin How (810 ft) standing above Mockerkin Tarn. A natural water body, the Tarn is known for its water lilies, is stocked with eel, pike and perch, and is associated with several local legends, including that of a sunken town.

The northeastern flanks of Burnbank Fell are much steeper, with some crags on the upper slopes overlooking Loweswater. Lower down the fellside is Holme Wood, an attractive background to views across the lake. Holme Beck runs down through the trees, forming the boundary between Burnbank Fell and Blake Fell to the south. High up in the woods is Holme Force, an attractive parallel pair of waterfalls.

A west ridge drops from the summit across an easy grassy saddle to Owsen Fell (1,342 ft), generally considered a part of Burnbank Fell, although some guidebooks differ. Owsen Fell descends to the village of Lamplugh, with conifer plantations on its lower slopes. All drainage from Owsen Fell and the western slopes flows to the River Marron and ultimately the Derwent.

== Geology ==
The summit area is composed of the laminated mudstone and siltstone of the Kirk Stile Formation. The eastern slopes show outcropping of the Loweswater Formation of greywacke sandstone turbidities.

The Ordnance Survey Explorer map series shows abandoned mine levels above Wisenholme Beck and some surface extraction near the summit. Wainwright shows a further old level on the eastern slopes.

== Summit ==
The top of Burnbank Fell is a rounded grassy dome, the summit marked by an old fence post and small cairn. The Lakeland view is greatly restricted by Blake Fell, although there is a vista of the Northern and North Western Fells. Loweswater is hidden by the slope, but Crummock Water comes into view a few paces to the northeast. The view of the coast, Isle of Man, Solway Firth and Criffel is uninterrupted.

== Ascents ==
From Lamplugh, the obvious line is up Owsen Fell, although there is doubt over right of access. From Waterend at the head of Loweswater, the route starts via Hudson Place farm and passes into Holme Wood; various paths can then be taken to the summit. Two paths contour the fell on this side: one on the lakeshore, and another 'terrace' above the woods. Both provide pleasant walking. Fangs Brow farm can be used as an access point to the terrace path from the north.
