= High Crag =

Mountain in Cumbria, England

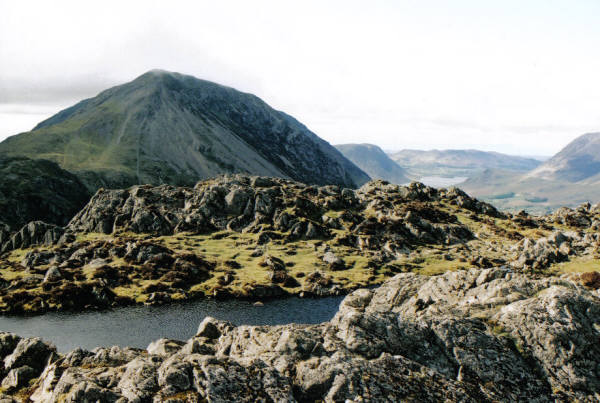
- High Crag from the summit tarn on Haystacks

Highest point
- Elevation: 744 m (2,441 ft)
- Prominence: c. 29 m
- Listing: Wainwright, Hewitt, Nuttall
- Coordinates: 54°30′53″N 3°16′05″W

Geography
- Location within the Lake District Location within the former Allerdale Borough Location within the former Borough of Copeland
- Location: Cumbria, England
- Parent range: Lake District, Western Fells
- OS grid: NY180140
- Topo map: OS Landranger 89

High Crag stands at the southern end of the High Stile ridge which divides the valleys of Ennerdale and Buttermere in the west of the English Lake District. It is often climbed as part of a popular ridge walk, from Black Sail youth hostel, or from Buttermere via Scarth Gap. Panoramas of Great Gable and the Scafells are visible.

== Topography ==
The Western Fells occupy a triangular sector of the Lake District, bordered by the River Cocker to the north east and Wasdale to the south east. Westwards the hills diminish toward the coastal plain of Cumberland. At the central hub of the high country are Great Gable and its satellites, while two principal ridges fan out on either flank of Ennerdale, the western fells in effect being a great horseshoe around this long wild valley. The highest section of the northern branch is formed by the trio of Buttermere fells, High Crag, High Stile and Red Pike.

The Buttermere Fells, also known as Buttermere Edge, form the watershed between Buttermere and Upper Ennerdale. The Ennerdale flanks are steep and rough, put with only small areas of crag, the lower slopes being planted with a ribbon of conifers. Across the narrow ridge-top to the north are deep corries and dark walls of crag, glowering down over the lake. The ridge continues south east to Haystacks and the Great Gable group. Beyond Red Pike to the west are Starling Dodd, Great Borne and the Loweswater Fells.

High Crag forms the eastern terminus of the Buttermere Fells, its most arresting feature being the great scree slopes of Gamlin End where the high ground falls away. 700 feet (210 m) below, the ridge levels out once more and throws up the craggy top of Seat (1,840 feet; 560 m). A final steep descent then leads to Scarth Gap, a walkers' pass between Buttermere and Ennerdale.

All three Buttermere Fells throw out a rocky spur toward the lake, these walls enclosing Birkness and Bleaberry Combs. Birkness Comb, also called Burtness Comb on Ordnance Survey maps, lies between the truncated and unnamed northern ridges of High Crag and High Stile. Drained into Buttermere by Comb Beck, its headwall is rimmed by crags on all sides. Sheepbone Buttress flanks High Crag, which also has a share in Comb Crags, lining the onward ridge. It is the great scooped hollow of the Comb which results in the narrowness of Buttermere Edge. The northern spur also ends abruptly as High Crag Buttress, a further tier of rock lying just above the lakeshore.

== Geology ==
The summit rocks are of the Birker Fell Formation, plagioclase-phyric andesite lavas. Interbeds of volcaniclastic sandstone and lapilli tuff also appear. Seat is an outcrop of the flow banded andesite lavas of the Haystacks Member, shot through with quartz-feldspar phyric microgranite.

There was small scale mining activity in the late nineteenth century beneath Low Wax Knott, adjacent to the Scarth Gap path. Two men worked the operation, living on the fellside in a hut. A search was organised after their regular visits to the local hostelry abruptly ceased, and one was found dead in a pool at Warnscale. It was suspected that the other had killed him.

== Summit ==
The triangular summit has a cairn at the high point above Gamlin End. The view is restricted by High Stile, but the head of Ennerdale- backed by the Scafells- presents a fine picture. More distant glimpses of Skiddaw and the Helvellyn range are also granted. A short walk north west toward the top of the crags brings Buttermere and Crummock Water into sight.

== Ascents ==
Scarth Gap can be gained from the head of Ennerdale, but this is a long walk from anywhere except Black Sail Youth Hostel. Scarth Gap provides the more regular approach from the Buttermere valley, parking being available at Gatesgarth. On the Buttermere side a path cuts off the corner at the top of the pass and removes the need to first ascend Seat, before the long assault on the screes of Gamlin End. From the shore of Buttermere Wainwright noted that an ascent may be made via Birkness Comb, climbing a grassy rake through the crags.
