= Blake Fell =

Hill in Cumbria, England

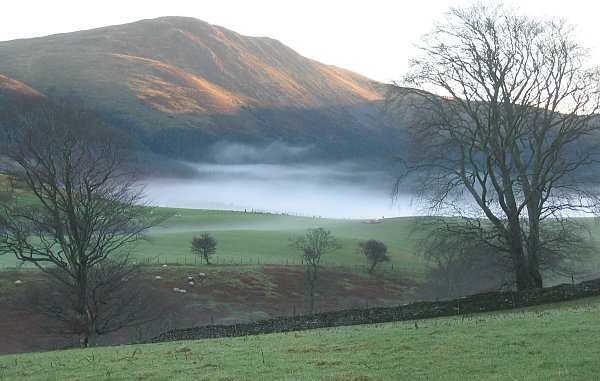
- Blake Fell seen over the reservoir of Cogra Moss.

Highest point
- Elevation: 573 m (1,880 ft)
- Prominence: 164 m (538 ft)
- Parent peak: High Stile
- Listing: Marilyn, Wainwright
- Coordinates: 54°33′50″N 3°22′41″W

Naming
- English translation: (possibly Black Fell)
- Language of name: Old English

Geography
- Location within the Lake District Location within the former Allerdale Borough Location within the former Borough of Copeland
- Location: Cumbria, England
- Parent range: Lake District, Western Fells
- OS grid: NY110196
- Topo map: OS Landranger 89, 90, Explorer OL4

Blake Fell is a hill in the Western part of the English Lake District. It is the highest point of the Loweswater Fells, an area of low grassy hills with steep sides overlooking the lake of Loweswater. The fell also overlooks the village of Loweswater, from which it can be climbed. An alternative route is from the Cogra Moss reservoir on its western slopes. Because the Loweswater Fells are a separate geographical unit, Blake Fell is a Marilyn. It is located in the Parish of Lamplugh.

== Topography ==
The Western Fells occupy a triangular sector of the Lake District, bordered by the River Cocker to the north east and Wasdale to the south east. Westwards the hills diminish toward the coastal plain of Cumberland. At the central hub of the high country are Great Gable and its satellites, while two principal ridges fan out on either flank of Ennerdale, the western fells in effect being a great horseshoe around this long wild valley. Blake Fell and the other Loweswater Fells form the extremity of the northern arm.

The Loweswater Fells have been compared to the digits of a hand, radiating out south westward from the "palm" centred on Loweswater village. From the west these are Burnbank Fell, Blake Fell, Gavel Fell, Hen Comb and Mellbreak, the "thumb".

Blake Fell is the highest hill in this group, the summit area being a long ridge running southwest along the "finger". This begins above the shore of Loweswater, rising steeply through the mixed forestry of Holme Wood to the craggy height of Loweswater End. Atop the rise is Carling Knott, 1,784 ft (544 m), the north eastern summit. The ridge then dips slightly, the landscape changing from rock outcrop to grass, before the final ascent to Blake Fell. A transverse ridge now connects northwards to Burnbank Fell, in truth an outlier of Blake Fell, but given separate status by Alfred Wainwright in his influential Pictorial Guide to the Lakeland Fells. Southward is the narrow grassy col of Fothergill Head, providing a much more tenuous link to Gavel Fell. The western slopes are heavily wooded with conifers and contoured by forest roads.

In addition to Carling Knott, Blake Fell has a number of other subsidiary tops. Descending south west from the summit are High Pen, 1,558 ft (475 m), Low Pen, 1,427 ft (435 m), Godworth, 1,197 ft (365 m), and Kelton Fell, 1,020 ft (310 m). Beyond lie the Croasdale road and the West Cumberland plain. Standing aloof from these tops, but still within Blake Fell's orbit, is Knock Murton at 1,467 ft (447 m). This is a steep sided fell, forested on the western flank and with sufficient prominence that it is only barely excluded from the list of Marilyns in its own right. Blake Fell also extends a western ridge over the prominent top of Sharp Knott, 1,581 ft (482 m), and the wooded High Howes, 1,027 ft (313 m), falling gently to the village of Lamplugh. These tops are recognised in some guidebooks.

Drainage from the western slopes flows via Sharp Knott Gill and Fother Gill to Cogra Moss. This is a reservoir sitting in the deep valley between Blake Fell and Knock Murton, a reed rimmed waterbody held back by a substantial dam at the western end. Also known as Arlecdon Reservoir, it has a depth of around 30 feet (10 m). The waters from this flank of the fell join the River Marron and ultimately the Derwent. The eastern face of Blake Fell flows either to Loweswater or to its outfall, ensuring that all of the drainage eventually runs to the River Derwent.

== Geology ==
The summit of Blake Fell is representative of the Kirkstile Formation, laminated mudstone and siltstone typical of the Skiddaw fells. The rougher terrain of Carling Knott is an outcropping of the underlying Loweswater Formation, composed of greywacke sandstone turbidities.

Knock Murton and Kelton Fell bear the scars of mining activity, having been the site of extensive haematite workings. Between 1853 and their closure in 1914 these mines produced anything up to 60,000 tons of ore per year. A railway, the Rowrah and Kelton Fell Line, was built up the valley between the two hills, the line of which can still be traced. A further working, the Croasdale Iron Mine, operated to the south of Kelton Fell.

== Summit ==
The summit is a grassy dome decorated with a large cairn, the meeting point of paths from the various ridges. Westwards there is no higher ground to interrupt the sea view. To the east is a fine array of hills stretching from Binsey in the north to Grike in the south. The North Western Fells across Crummock Water are particularly fine, although much better seen from Loweswater End.

== Ascents ==
From Loweswater village a direct line can be taken up Carling Knott, or a more southerly approach made via High Nook Beck. From the west, Lamplugh or Felldyke provide good access, lying at either end of a network of footpaths. These connect to the track alongside Cogra Moss which can be used to gain the high ground via Low Pen. Knock Murton can also be ascended from the head of the reservoir.
