= Listed buildings in Loweswater, Cumbria =

Loweswater is a civil parish in the Cumberland unitary authority area of Cumbria, England. It contains 24 listed buildings that are recorded in the National Heritage List for England. All the listed buildings are designated at Grade II, the lowest of the three grades, which is applied to "buildings of national importance and special interest". Most of the parish is in the Lake District National Park. It contains the villages of Loweswater and Mockerkin, and is otherwise rural. Almost all the listed buildings are, or originated as, farmhouses and farm buildings, the other listed buildings being private houses and associated structures, and a telephone kiosk.

== Buildings ==
Name and location	Photograph	Date	Notes
Godferhead Farmhouse; 54.58016°N 3.32269°W	—	Mid 17th century	The farmhouse was extended in 1773, and is roughcast with a green slate roof. The original part has two storeys and two bays, the higher extension at right-angles has two storeys and three bays, and there is a rear outshut. The original part has projecting plinth stones, and the windows are mullioned. The extension contains quoins, an eaves cornice, a doorway with pilasters and an open segmental pediment, and sash windows with architraves. At the rear of the extension is a round-headed stair window.
Crabtreebeck and stables 54.58174°N 3.34681°W	—	1660	The former farmhouse and stables are in rendered slate, with a roof partly of green slate and partly of Welsh slate. It has two storeys and is in two parts; the earlier part has two bays and the later part, dating from the late 17th century, has two bays and a stable at the left. At the rear of the earlier part is a semicircular staircase projection. The older part has a 17th-century stone porch with an internal stone seat. Most of the windows are casements, although some windows have retained their mullions. Inside the older part is an inglenook and an arched bressumer.
Iredale Place Cottage and barn 54.59138°N 3.37747°W	—	Late 17th century	The former farmhouse and barn have been converted into a private house and garage, and an extension was added to the rear in the 20th century. The building is in rendered slate rubble with a green slate roof. The house has two storeys and three bays, with the former barn to the right. There are two doorways on the front, one with a porch and a chamfered surround, and one at the back with an inscribed lintel The windows are mullioned, and some are blocked. In the barn is a garage door and a ventilation slit.
Barn opposite Iredale Place Cottage; 54.59139°N 3.37791°W	—	Late 17th century	The barn has walls of slate and a roof of green slate. There are two storeys and three bays. It contains two doorways and a loft door with chamfered surrounds. To the left is a single-storey extension with a corrugated roof.
Waterend Farmhouse; 54.59103°N 3.36865°W	—	Late 17th century	The farmhouse was extended and altered in 1864 and in the 20th century. It is roughcast with two storeys, and has a main part of four bays with a rear extension at right-angles with two bays. Some of the windows are mullioned with hood moulds, and others date from the 19th and 20th centuries.
West house, Low Park; 54.57177°N 3.32545°W	—	Late 17th century	The house was extended in 1812, and has since been divided into two dwellings. The whole building has a green slate roof and is in two storeys. The original part is roughcast, and has three bays with a former stable to the left incorporated into the house. It contains mullioned windows and one casement window. The extension is rendered with a modillioned cornice, angle pilasters, and coped gables. The windows are sashes, and the doorway has a dated lintel.
Miresyke Farmhouse and barn 54.58996°N 3.36000°W	—	1691	The farmhouse, later a private house, is roughcast with a green slate roof. It is in two storeys and three bays, with outshuts at the rear. On the front is a porch and a doorway with an inscribed and dated lintel. The windows on the front are sashes, and at the rear they are mullioned. The lower barn to the right is rendered and has a corrugated iron roof. There is an outshut at the rear, and the barn contains casement windows, ventilation slits, and an upper floor doorway. Inside the house is an inglenook.
High Nook Farmhouse; 54.57233°N 3.34905°W	—	Late 17th or early 18th century	A roughcast farmhouse with a green slate roof, in two storeys and three bays, and with a rear outshut. There is a 20th-century porch, and the windows are of varying types, including casements and horizontally sliding sashes in chamfered surrounds. In the outshut is a mullioned window, and there is evidence of removed mullions in the main part of the house.
East house and barn, Low Park; 54.57164°N 3.32489°W	—	Early 18th century	The farmhouse and barn have a green slate roof. The house is roughcast, and has two storeys and two bays. The doorway has a gabled stone porch with internal side seats, and the windows are mullioned. The higher barn to the right is in slate rubble, and there are external slate steps leading to a loft door.
Middle house, Low Park; 54.57178°N 3.32505°W	—	Early 18th century	The house was extended in 1790. It is roughcast with a green slate roof, and is in two storeys. The original part has four bays, a door with a dated and inscribed lintel, another doorway with a slate hood, and mullioned windows. The extension is at right-angles, with three bays, and has quoins, an eaves cornice and coped gables. Above the door is a fanlight and the windows are sashes. In the right return is a large round-headed stair window.
High Park and barns 54.57036°N 3.32396°W	—	Early 18th century	The farmhouse and barns are in slate rubble with green slate roofs. The house has quoins, and is in two storeys and three bays with a rear extension. The doorway has an alternate-block surround, and the windows are mullioned. The barns flank the house at right angles, they have doorways, and the left barn has external slate steps leading to a loft door.
Barn, Miresykes Farm; 54.58998°N 3.36039°W	—	Early 18th century	The barn has roughcast slate rubble walls and a corrugated asbestos roof. It has a central single-storey part with an extension on each side. The barn contains various openings, including a large projecting cart entrance, doorways, loft doors, and pigeon holes with projecting slate shelves.
Rose Cottage; 54.60110°N 3.31983°W	—	Early 18th century	The house was altered in 1741. It is roughcast with projecting plinth stones, and has a green slate roof. There are two storeys and three bays. Above the doorway is a dated lintel, the windows on the front are sashes, and at the rear is a mullioned window. Inside the house are an inglenook and a bressumer.
Hudson Place Farmhouse; 54.58738°N 3.37060°W		1741	A roughcast farmhouse with quoins, an eaves cornice, and a green slate roof with coped gables. There are two storeys and three bays, with a lower single-bay extension to the left. The porch has shaped side walls, pilasters and a segmental hood. The doorway and the sash windows in the main part have architraves. In the extension is a casement window.
Kirkhead House and barn 54.57467°N 3.33185°W	—	Mid 18th century	The house and barn are roughcast with a green slate roof. The house, on a chamfered plinth, has quoins and an eaves cornice. It is in two storeys and three bays, with a single-bay extension to the left. The doorway has an architrave, a shell hood, and a shaped cornice. Most of the windows are sashes, with one casement window and a round-headed stair window at the rear. The barn has outshuts, plank doors, and projecting hoods.
Northeast barn, Low Park; 54.57179°N 3.32469°W	—	18th century	The barn is in slate rubble with a green slate roof. It has a single storey, four bays, and an extension to the left with a front outshut. The barn contains a projecting cart entrance, three doorways, and a loft door.
Foulsyke and rear stable block 54.58178°N 3.32915°W	—	1797	The house is stuccoed with quoins, and it has a green slate roof with coped stables and ball finials. There are two storeys and five bays, with a further gabled wing at the right, and a recessed single-storey wing to the left. On the front is a porch with pilasters, and to the left is a bay window. Most of the other windows are sashes. At the rear are L-shaped stables that have a segmental-arched doorway with a dated keystone. (Note: Street View in April 2009 shows that parts of the property have been converted into holiday accommodation.)
High Cross; 54.57967°N 3.33672°W	—	Late 18th or early 19th century	A stuccoed farmhouse with quoins, an eaves cornice, and a green slate roof with coped gables. It has two storeys and five bays. The doorway and sash windows have architraves, and above the door is a fanlight.
Muncaster House; 54.57713°N 3.32056°W	—	Late 18th or early 19th century	A rendered house that has a Lakeland slate roof with coped gables. It has two storeys and three bays, one narrow, and two wider. On the front is an iron round-headed trellised porch, and the windows have been replaced. At the rear is a round-headed staircase window, small fire windows, and sash windows.
Beech Croft; 54.59555°N 3.40922°W		Early 19th century	A pebbledashed farmhouse with quoins and a tile roof. It has two storeys, three bays, and a doorway with a fanlight.
Mockerkin Hall; 54.59661°N 3.41000°W	—	Early 19th century	A stuccoed house with a string course, an eaves cornice, a parapet, angle pilasters, and a green slate roof. It has two storeys, three bays, and a projecting single-storey bay to the left. In the centre is a Tuscan porch, and above the door is a fanlight. The windows are sashes in architraves.
Wall, railings and gateway, Mockerkin Hall; 54.59654°N 3.40986°W	—	Early 19th century	In front of the hall is a low ashlar wall carrying patterned cast iron railings. The gate piers have a hexagonal plan, and between them is a patterned gate.
Wall, railings and gateway, High Cross; 54.57959°N 3.33670°W	—	Mid 19th century	The wall surrounds the garden in front of the house, it is rendered, and has sandstone saddleback coping. On the wall are spearhead cast iron railings, and the square gate piers have shaped panels.
Telephone kiosk 54.57779°N 3.32727°W	—	1935	A K6 type telephone kiosk, designed by Giles Gilbert Scott. Constructed in cast iron with a square plan and a dome, it has three unperforated crowns in the top panels.

== Notes and references ==
=== Sources ===
- Historic England, "Godferhead Farmhouse, Loweswater (1311790)", National Heritage List for England
- Historic England, "Crabtreebeck and stables adjoining, Loweswater (1145153)", National Heritage List for England
- Historic England, "Iredale Place Cottage and barn adjoining, Loweswater (1326872)", National Heritage List for England
- Historic England, "Barn opposite Iredale Place Cottage, Loweswater (1311818)", National Heritage List for England
- Historic England, "Waterend Farmhouse, Loweswater (1145152)", National Heritage List for England
- Historic England, "West house in a group of three, in the occupation of Mr Jenkinson and Mrs Morris, Loweswater (1145157)", National Heritage List for England
- Historic England, "Miresyke Farmhouse and barn adjoining, Loweswater (1326873)", National Heritage List for England
- Historic England, "High Nook Farmhouse, Loweswater (1311787)", National Heritage List for England
- Historic England, "East unnamed house and barn adjoining in group of three owned by Rev R.H. Watkins, Loweswater (1145158)", National Heritage List for England
- Historic England, "Middle unnamed house and barn adjoining in group of three owned by Rev R.H. Watkins, Loweswater (1146497)", National Heritage List for England
- Historic England, "High Park and barns adjoining, Loweswater (1146462)", National Heritage List for England
- Historic England, "Barn opposite Miresykes Farmhouse, Loweswater (1311783)", National Heritage List for England
- Historic England, "Rose Cottage, Loweswater (1145160)", National Heritage List for England
- Historic England, "Hudson Place Farmhouse, Loweswater (1146467)", National Heritage List for England
- Historic England, "Kirkhead House and barn, Loweswater (1145155)", National Heritage List for England
- Historic England, "Barn north-east of east unnamed house in group of three, Loweswater (1311796)", National Heritage List for England
- Historic England, "Foulsyke and rear stable block, Loweswater (1145156)", National Heritage List for England
- Historic England, "High Cross, Loweswater (1145154)", National Heritage List for England
- Historic England, "Muncaster House, Loweswater (1157935)", National Heritage List for England
- Historic England, "Beech Croft, Loweswater (1145159)", National Heritage List for England
- Historic England, "Mockerkin Hall, Loweswater (1326874)", National Heritage List for England
- Historic England, "Wall, railings and gate piers in front of Mockerkin Hall, Loweswater (1146512)", National Heritage List for England
- Historic England, "Wall, railings and gateway forming front garden wall of High Cross, Loweswater (1146483)", National Heritage List for England
- Historic England, "K6 Telephone Kiosk, Loweswater (1157937)", National Heritage List for England
- Historic England, Listed Buildings
- Hyde, Matthew; Pevsner, Nikolaus (2010) [1967], Cumbria, The Buildings of England, New Haven and London: Yale University Press, ISBN 978-0-300-12663-1
