= Mellbreak =

Hill in Cumbria, England

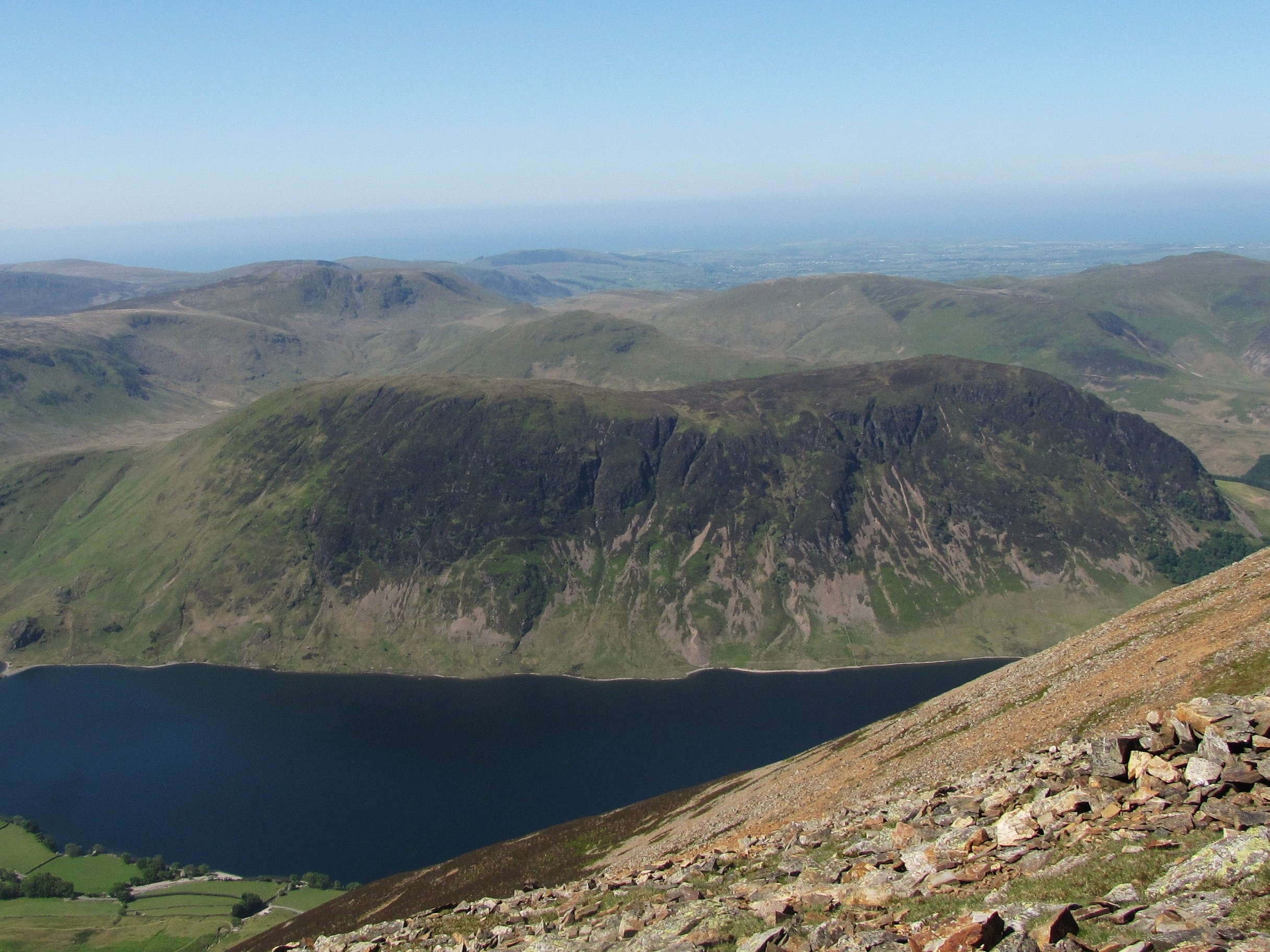
- Mellbreak seen from Grasmoor summit. Three km to the east.

Highest point
- Elevation: 512 m (1,680 ft)
- Prominence: 260 m (850 ft)
- Parent peak: High Stile
- Listing: Marilyn, Wainwright
- Coordinates: 54°33′20″N 3°19′08″W

Geography
- Location within the Lake District Location within the former Allerdale Borough
- Location: Cumbria, England
- Parent range: Lake District, Western Fells
- OS grid: NY148186
- Topo map: OS Landranger 89, Explorer OL4

Mellbreak is a hill in the Western part of the English Lake District. Despite being surrounded on all sides by higher fells (the Loweswater Fells, the High Stile Ridge and the Grasmoor Group), it stands in isolation. It is surrounded on three sides by a "moat" of deep marshy land, and on the east side by the lake of Crummock Water. The fell forms a partnership with the lake, running parallel to it, falling sheer into it, and regularly providing the backdrop for pictures of it.

== Name ==
Mellbreak's name is derived from differing sources: the Celtic "moel", meaning "bare hill", and the later Old Norse of the Vikings, "brekka", which means a hill slope.

== Topography ==
The Western Fells occupy a triangular sector of the Lake District, bordered by the River Cocker to the north east and Wasdale to the south east. Westwards, the hills diminish toward the coastal plain of Cumberland. At the central hub of the high country are Great Gable and its satellites, while two principal ridges fan out on either flank of Ennerdale, the western fells in effect being a great horseshoe around this long wild valley. Mellbreak and the other Loweswater Fells form the extremity of the northern arm.

The Loweswater Fells have been compared to the digits of a hand, radiating out south westward from the "palm" centred on Loweswater village. From the west these are Burnbank Fell, Blake Fell, Gavel Fell, Hen Comb and Mellbreak, the "thumb". To continue the hand metaphor, the opposing thumb of Mellbreak is the tenuous northern extremity of Starling Dodd, whilst the other Loweswater Fells are satellites of Great Borne.

The fell has been likened (by Alfred Wainwright and others) to the shape of an upturned boat, having north and south tops of roughly equal height and a wide flat depression in between. On the eastern side the steep slopes run down directly to the shore of Crummock Water. Low Ling Crag, a rocky projection into the lake, is a continuation of outcrops higher up. Other crags rim the depression between the two tops.

The southern boundary is formed by Scale Beck and its tributary Black Beck. Mellbreak has a third much lower top overlooking this steep sided valley, Scale Kott (1,109 ft). At the head of Black Beck is the connection to Starling Dodd, running south west from Scale Knott. This could hardly be considered a ridge in walking terms, since it begins at the foot of an 800 ft scree slope on the northern flank of Starling Dodd.

To the west of Mellbreak is the marshy valley of Mosedale, its beck flowing north to Loweswater village. On the other side is the parallel ridge of Hen Comb. The northern end of Mellbreak rises direct from the valley behind the village, precipitous like a sand castle on a flat beach. From this vantage point its steep gabled profile is an arresting sight. The successive rock tiers of White, Dropping and Raven Crags complete the picture.

== Geology ==
Mellbreak is formed primarily from the laminated mudstone and siltstone of the Kirkstile Formation. There is an intrusion of basalt on the Crummock face and the southern end around Scale Knott exhibit the Buttermere Formation. This is an olistostrome of disrupted, sheared and folded mudstone, siltstone and sandstone. The rocks of Hen Comb are of the Kirkstile Formation, laminated mudstone and siltstone, often associated with the Skiddaw group.

There are two small trials for iron, one on each side of the fell. Neither penetrates for more than a few feet.

== Summit ==
Although the south top is slightly higher, at 512 m (1,680 ft) it is the north top (509 m, 1,670 ft) that is the better summit, being rocky and situated on the top of the crags that make up the north face of the fell. Both carry substantial cairns, that of the true summit being on grass. The views are good from both summits, a consequence of Mellbreak's isolation and great relative height. The north top brings the Solway Firth into view, but otherwise the differences are mainly confined to the foreground. Grasmoor and Rannerdale Knotts look impressive across the lake, an unexpected glimpse of the Helvellyn range seen behind.

== Ascents ==
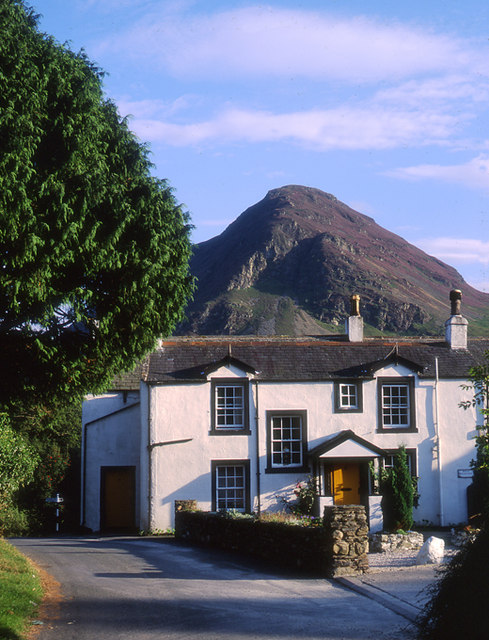
Mellbreak seen from the Kirkstile Inn, in Loweswater village

A popular route up the fell is a path from the village of Loweswater, that threads its way between the crags and rocky outcrops on the north side. The north top is then traversed to reach the summit. A variation misses out the north top, following a slanting path southwards along the Mosedale face to the depression. From the shore of Crummock Water an ascent can be made following Pillar Rake, a diagonal breach in the central rim of crag. A direct climb of the south top direct is best achieved from Buttermere village, starting along the Scale Force path before making for Scale Knott.
