= Bleaberry Tarn =

Upland lake in Cumbria, England

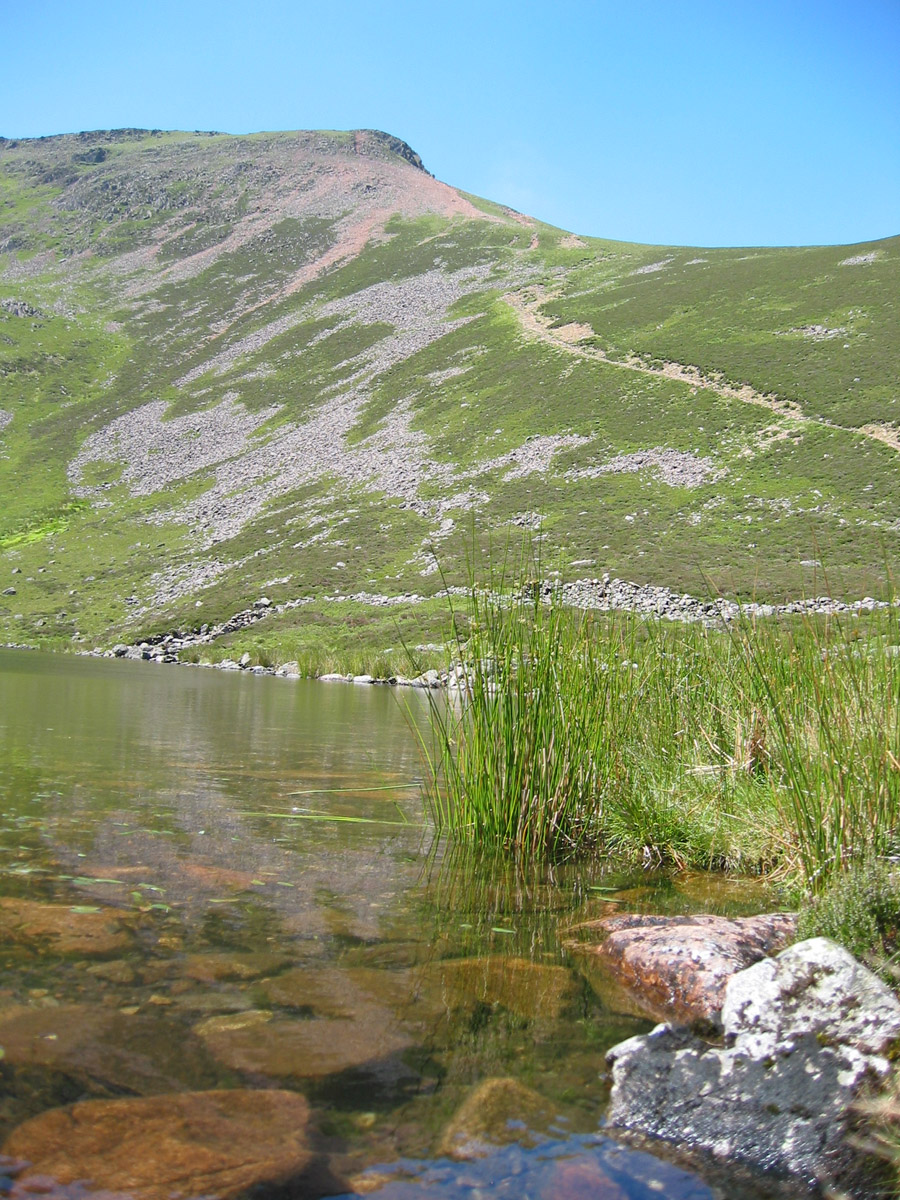
- Bleaberry Tarn, in front of Red Pike

- Location in the Lake District National Park Location in Allerdale, Cumbria
- Location: Lake District
- Coordinates: 54°31′38″N 3°17′25″W
- Type: tarn
- Basin countries: United Kingdom

Bleaberry Tarn is a small natural mountain tarn near Buttermere in the English Lake District. Located at NY165154 (OS Landranger 89), it lies in a corrie below the Lakeland fells of Red Pike and High Stile, backed by Chapel Crags on the ridge between them. The footpath ascending Red Pike from Buttermere skirts its north side. A. Wainwright describes the tarn as "secluded" and suggests it formed in a volcanic crater.

The stream Sour Milk Gill descends from the tarn to Buttermere, and is followed by one of the popular footpaths ascending Red Pike.

In the 19th century, it was sometimes additionally known as "Burtness Tarn" or "Blebba Tarn".
