= Innominate Tarn =

Lake in Cumbria, England

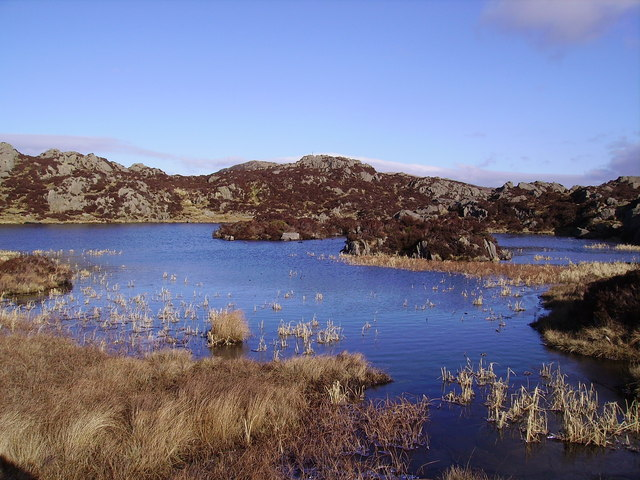

- Location in the Lake District Location in Copeland Borough
- Location: Lake District, Cumbria
- Coordinates: 54°30′20″N 3°14′27″W
- Type: tarn
- Basin countries: United Kingdom
- Surface elevation: 520 m (1,710 ft)

Innominate Tarn is a small tarn in the north of the Lake District National Park in England. It is situated at 520 metres above sea level, near the summit of Haystacks. The word Innominate means "without a name".

It was formerly known as Loaf Tarn.

The tarn is the location where Alfred Wainwright's ashes were scattered. He had expressed this wish in Fellwanderer: The Story behind the Guide Books:

"Every day that passes is a day less. That day will come when there is nothing left but memories. And afterwards, a last long resting place by the side of Innominate Tarn, on Haystacks, where the water gently laps the gravelly shore and the heather blooms and Pillar and Gable keep unfailing watch. A quiet place, a lonely place. I shall go to it, for the last time, and be carried: someone who knew me in life will take me and empty me out of a little box and leave me there alone. And if you, dear reader, should get a bit of grit in your boot as you are crossing Haystacks in the years to come, please treat it with respect. It might be me."
