= High Stile =

Fell in the Lake District, Cumbria, England

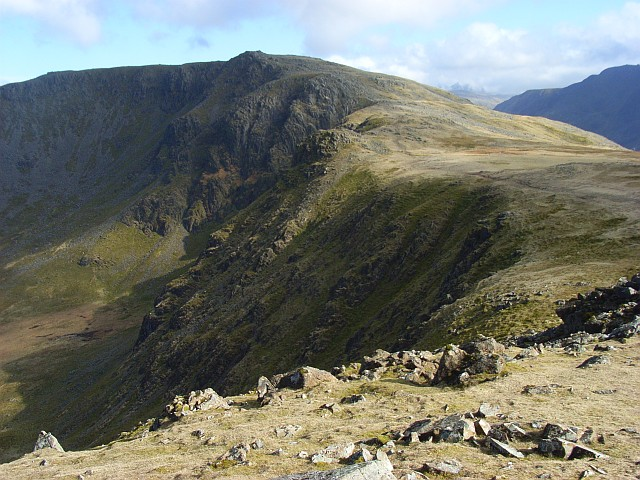
- High Stile from Red Pike

Highest point
- Elevation: 807 m (2,648 ft)
- Prominence: 362 m (1,188 ft)
- Parent peak: Great Gable
- Listing: Marilyn, Hewitt, Wainwright, Nuttall
- Coordinates: 54°31′18″N 3°17′02″W

Geography
- Location within the Lake District Location within the former Allerdale Borough Location within the former Borough of Copeland
- Location: Cumbria, England
- Parent range: Lake District, Western Fells
- OS grid: NY170148
- Topo map: OS Landranger 89, Explorer OL4

High Stile is a mountain in the western part of the Lake District in North West England. It is the eleventh-highest English Marilyn, standing 807 metres (2,648 ft) high, and has a relative height of 362 metres (1,188 ft).

It is the highest in the range of fells extending north-west from Great Gable towards Loweswater, and together with its satellites, Red Pike and High Crag, forms a trio of fells overlooking the lake and village of Buttermere. On this side are high crags, wild combes and a small tarn, Bleaberry Tarn. High Stile is most easily ascended as part of a traverse of the three fells.

== Topography ==
The Western Fells occupy a triangular sector of the Lake District, bordered by the River Cocker to the north east and Wasdale to the south east. Westwards the hills diminish toward the coastal plain of Cumberland. At the central hub of the high country are Great Gable and its satellites, while two principal ridges fan out on either flank of Ennerdale, the western fells in effect being a great horseshoe around this long wild valley. The highest section of the northern branch is formed by the trio of Buttermere fells, High Crag, High Stile and Red Pike.

The Buttermere Fells, also known as Buttermere Edge, form the watershed between Buttermere and Upper Ennerdale. The Ennerdale flanks are steep and rough with areas of crag, the lower slopes being planted with a ribbon of conifers. Across the narrow ridge-top to the north are deep corries and dark walls of crag, glowering down over the lake. The ridge continues south east to Haystacks and the Great Gable group. Beyond Red Pike to the west are Starling Dodd, Great Borne and the Loweswater Fells.

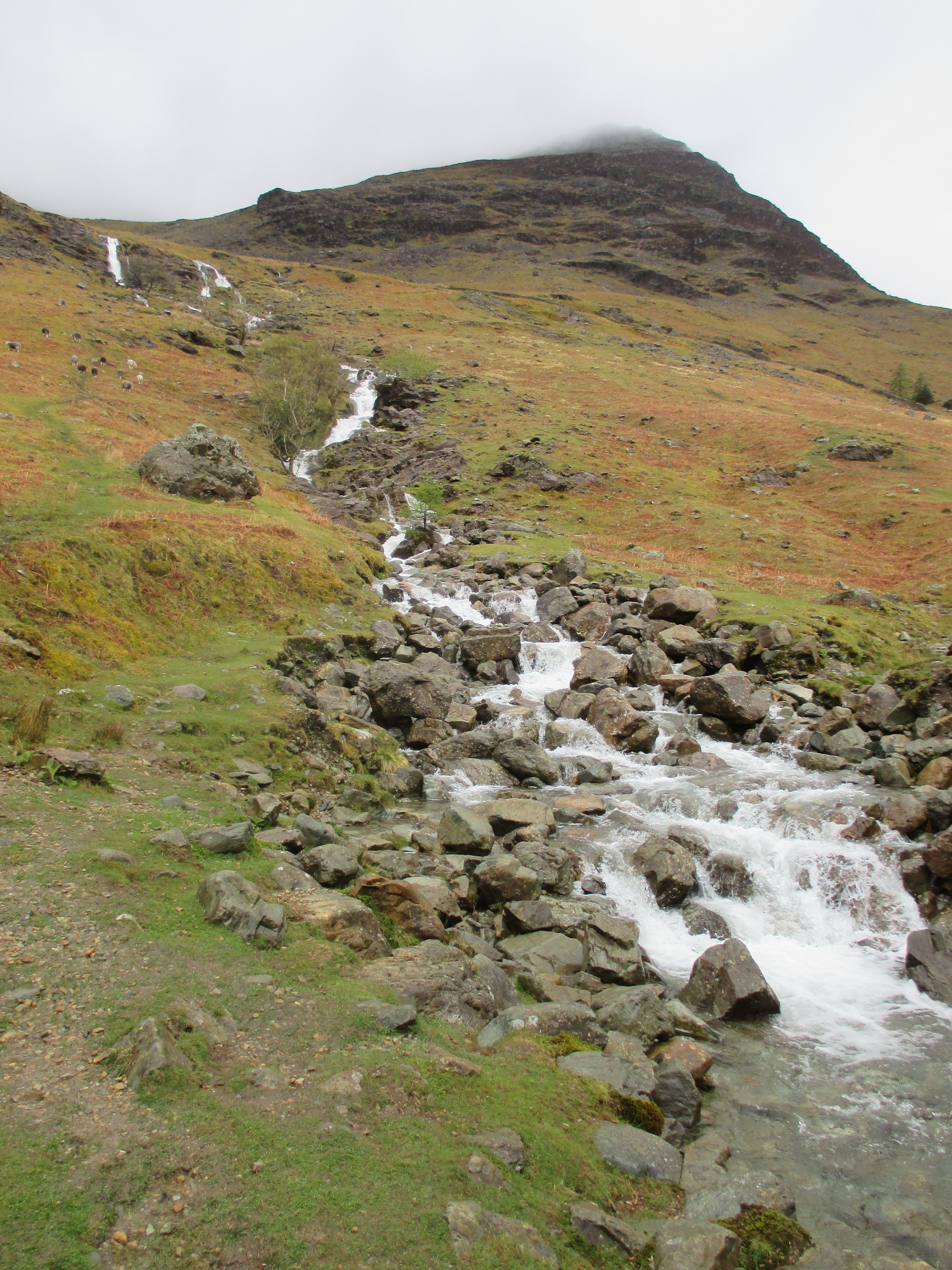
Comb Beck, with High Stile above

All three Buttermere Fells throw out a short spur towards the lake with deep combs hollowed out between them. North west of High Stile is Bleaberry Comb, backed by the wall of Chapel Crags. Nestled deep within is Bleaberry Tarn, a pool which is on continual shadow from November to March. Despite the steep contours of the rock walls above, the tarn is only about 15 ft (4.6 m) deep, and is well stocked with trout. Bleaberry Tarn is drained into Buttermere by Sourmilk Gill, reaching the lake mere yards from its outlet. A belt of trees has been planted along the shoreline. Birkness Comb, also called Burtness Comb on Ordnance Survey maps, lies between the truncated and unnamed northern ridges of High Crag and High Stile. The lack of a retaining moraine means that this hollow has no tarn, Comb Beck running uninterrupted to the Lake. Grey Crag and Eagle Crag are the main faces on High Stile. These corries being scooped out of the northern face result in the connecting ridges between the three Buttermere Fells being fine and narrow.

The Ennerdale flanks have a tier of crag at around 2,000 ft (610 m), The Knors and Raven Crag being the principal features. At the foot of the slopes are the massed conifers of the Ennerdale Forest, all contributing to the difficulty of access. There are no paths on the southern flank of High Stile.

== Geology ==
The summit area is formed of the siltstone, sandstone, conglomerate, tuff, lapilli tuff and andesite sills of the Eagle Crag Member. The northern slopes display the underlying olistostrome of disrupted, sheared and folded mudstone, siltstone and sandstone of the Buttermere Formation. In the direction of Red Pike are intrusions of the granophyric granite.

In Burtness Comb, a prominent bank of debris runs along the outer flank of the upper cirque, then turns down into the lower cirque, ending in a block strew at the intake wall. It marks the course of a rock avalanche which fell from Grey Crag on the summit rim of High Stile, and was channeled along the foot of the glacier some 11,000 years ago. It is unique in the Lake District.

There are the remains of a small copper-mine near the shore of Buttermere. This was worked from 1569 to 1570 and again in the 1820s.

== Summit ==
The highest point lies a little way out onto the northern spur at the top of Grey Crag, marked by a cairn. The highest point on the main ridge is only three feet (0.9 m) lower and was regarded as the summit by Alfred Wainwright, the maps available at the time not deciding the issue. This top has two main cairns side by side. In an attempt to avoid confusion some guidebooks refer to the summit as Grey Crag and the top on the ridge as High Stile.

The view is extensive, the highlight perhaps being the North Western Fells across the Buttermere valley. Ennerdale Water and Crummock Water are in view and careful steps toward the brink can also add Bleaberry Tarn to the picture. Fine views of the crags of the surrounding combs complete the foreground.

== Ascents ==
The fell is usually ascended as a traverse of the ‘Buttermere Three’, as the north eastern flank is very steep and rough. Strong walkers may continue the walk towards Haystacks, four miles (six kilometres) southeast. The direct ascent from Ennerdale (through forest and steep bracken) is not found in guidebooks. The fell is climbed as part of Variation 1 on the Coast to Coast Walk.

Direct ascents can be made if desired via either of the northern combs. From the shore of Buttermere a path runs up into Birkness Comb from where the northern spur can be gained. From Buttermere village the path to Bleaberry Tarn can be used, branching off to find a line around the eastern end of Chapel Crags. If climbing from Ennerdale the route up Red Pike may be used.
