= Scale Force =

Waterfall in Cumbria, England

Coordinates: 54.5432°N 3.3135°W

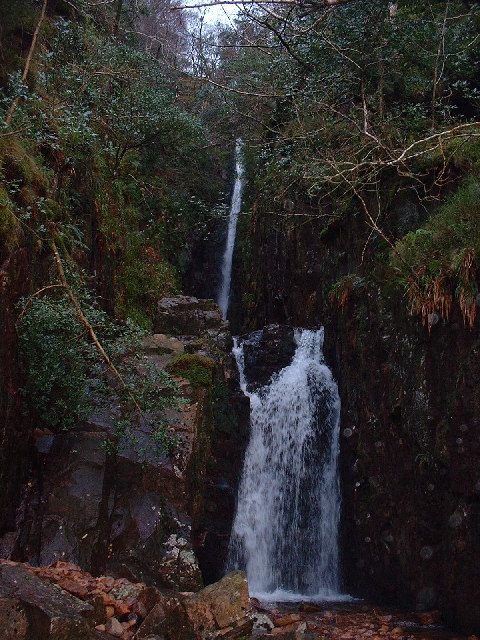
Scale Force

Scale Force is considered the highest waterfall in the English Lake District. Opinions vary about how its precise height is calculated, but the total height is normally stated as 170 feet (51.8m). It lies on the stream Scale Beck.

The waterfall – or force (a Norse term for waterfall) – is hidden in a deep gorge on the northern flank of Red Pike. It lies south of Crummock Water and is near the village of Buttermere.

William Wordsworth described Scale Force as "a fine chasm, with a lofty, though but slender, fall of water", while Samuel Taylor Coleridge wrote, "Scale Force, the white downfall of which glimmered through the trees, that hang before it like the bushy hair over a madman's eyes." In her poetical illustration Scale Force, Cumberland., to a painting by Thomas Allom, Letitia Elizabeth Landon writes "It sweeps, as sweeps an army Adown the mountain side, With the voice of many claps of thunder, like the battle’s sounding tide".

== See also ==
- List of waterfalls
- List of waterfalls in England
