= Mockerkin =

Settlement in Cumbria, England

Coordinates: 54.595837°N 3.410139°W

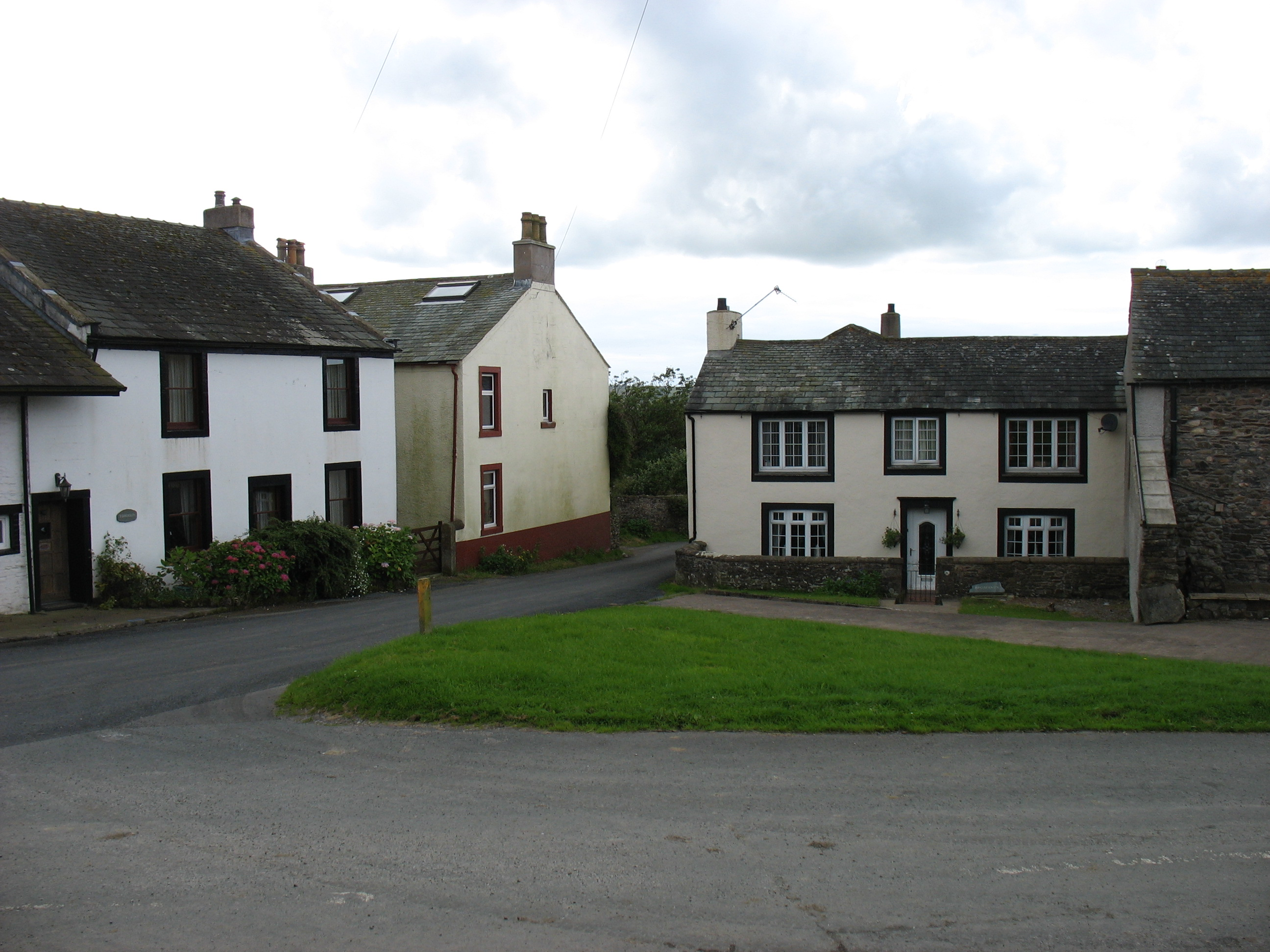
- Mockerkin village centre

- Location in Allerdale, Cumbria Location within Cumbria
- OS grid reference: NY089232
- Civil parish: Loweswater
- Unitary authority: Cumberland
- Ceremonial county: Cumbria
- Region: North West
- Country: England
- Sovereign state: United Kingdom
- Post town: COCKERMOUTH
- Postcode district: CA13
- Dialling code: 01946
- Police: Cumbria
- Fire: Cumbria
- Ambulance: North West
- UK Parliament: Penrith and Solway

Mockerkin is a settlement in the English county of Cumbria. Historically part of Cumberland, it is situated just outside the Lake District National Park.

It lies by road 6 miles (9.7 km) south of Cockermouth., 11.1 miles (18 km) east of Whitehaven, 32.6 miles (52 km) south-west of Carlisle and 48.2 miles (78 km) to the north of Barrow-in-Furness.

The name probably derives from the hill-top of a man called Corcán.

== Governance ==
Mockerkin is within the Penrith and Solway UK parliamentary constituency.

For Local Government purposes it is in the Cumberland unitary authority area.

The village also has its own Parish Council; Loweswater Parish Council, which is part of The Melbreak Communities (comprising the four parishes of Blindbothel, Buttermere, Lorton and Loweswater).
