= Haystacks (Lake District) =

Fell in the Lake District, Cumbria, England

Coordinates: 54.508°N 3.248°W

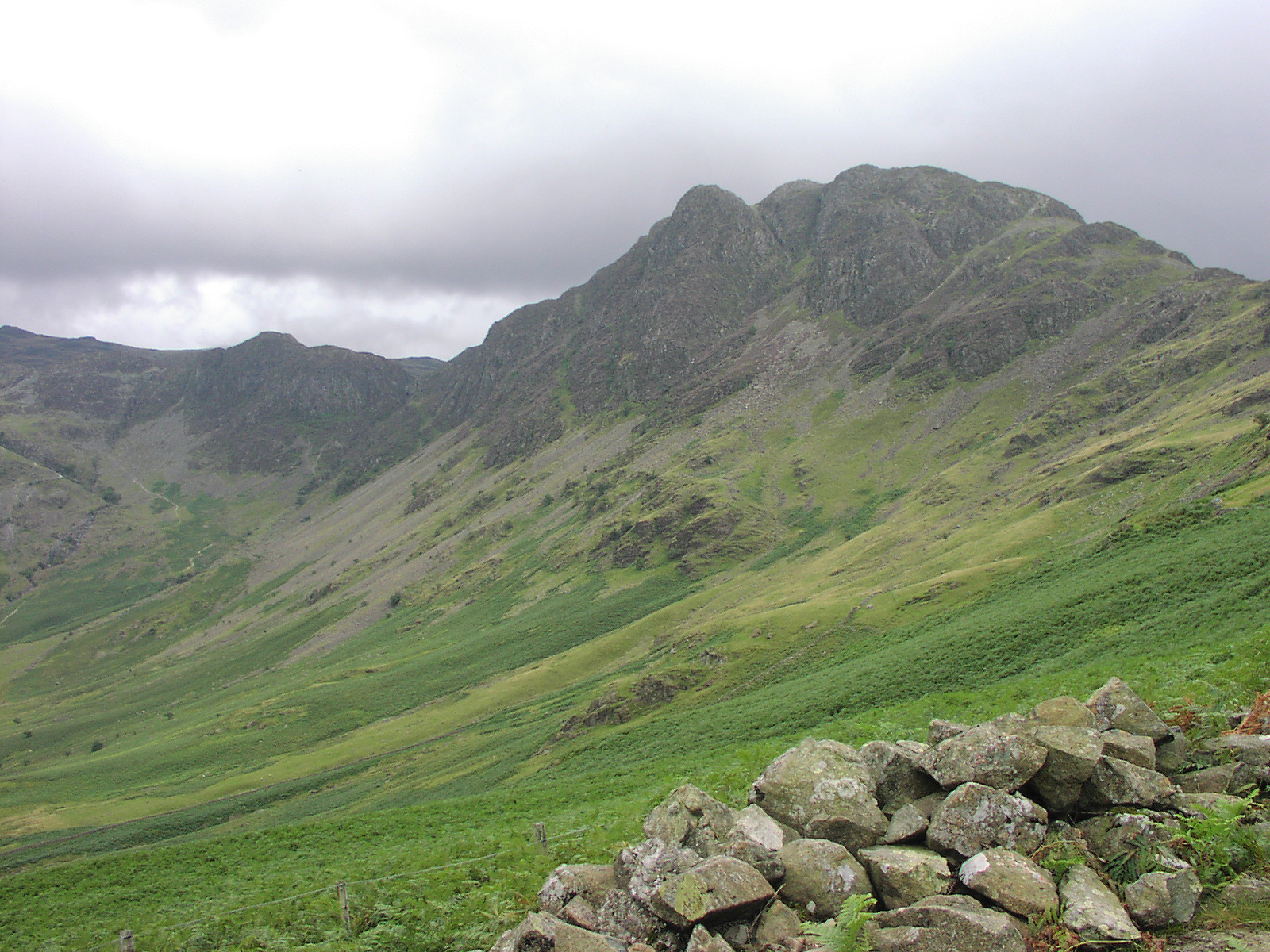

Highest point
- Elevation: 597 m (1,959 ft)
- Prominence: 92 m (302 ft)
- Listing: Wainwright

Geography
- Location within the Lake District Location within the former Allerdale Borough Location within the former Borough of Copeland
- Location: Cumbria, England
- Parent range: Lake District, Western Fells
- OS grid: NY193131
- Topo map(s): OS Landrangers 89, 90, Explorer, OL4

Haystacks, or Hay Stacks, is a hill in England's Lake District, situated at the south-eastern end of the Buttermere Valley. Although not of any great elevation (597 m, 1,959 ft), Haystacks has become one of the most popular fells in the area. This fame is partly due to the writings of Alfred Wainwright, who espoused its attractions and chose it as the place where he wanted his ashes scattered. Its large, undulating summit contains many rock formations, tarns and hidden recesses.

== Name ==
The name Haystacks derives from the appearance of the summit cliffs. According to Wainwright, the name comes from the Icelandic stack meaning 'a columnar rock'. The correct translation of this should be High Rocks.

== Topography ==
The Western Fells occupy a triangular sector of the Lake District, bordered by the River Cocker to the north east and Wasdale to the south east. Westwards the hills diminish toward the coastal plain of Cumberland. At the central hub of the high country are Great Gable and its satellites, while two principal ridges fan out on either flank of Ennerdale, the western fells in effect being a great horseshoe around this long wild valley. Although lower than its neighbours, Haystacks provides the connection between the Great Gable group and the northern branch of the horseshoe. Immediately to the south east are Brandreth, Green Gable and Great Gable, forming the head of Ennerdale. North west are the well known trio of Buttermere fells, High Crag, High Stile and Red Pike.

The Buttermere-Ennerdale watershed descending from Brandreth is initially indistinct, running north west across a broad plateau. After one-half mile (1 km) it reaches the rocky protuberance of Great Round How, 1,817 ft (554 m), and then its character changes completely. The watershed narrows to fine ridge, steep enough on the Ennerdale side and rimmed by crags throughout above the head of Buttermere. The beauty of the scene is completed by a succession of rocky tops and nestling tarns, until the high point is reached at the western end. A sharp descent over rock now follows, leading to Scarth Gap, 1,460 ft (450 m), a walkers' pass between the two valleys. Beyond the ridge rises again to High Crag, a steep climb on scree.

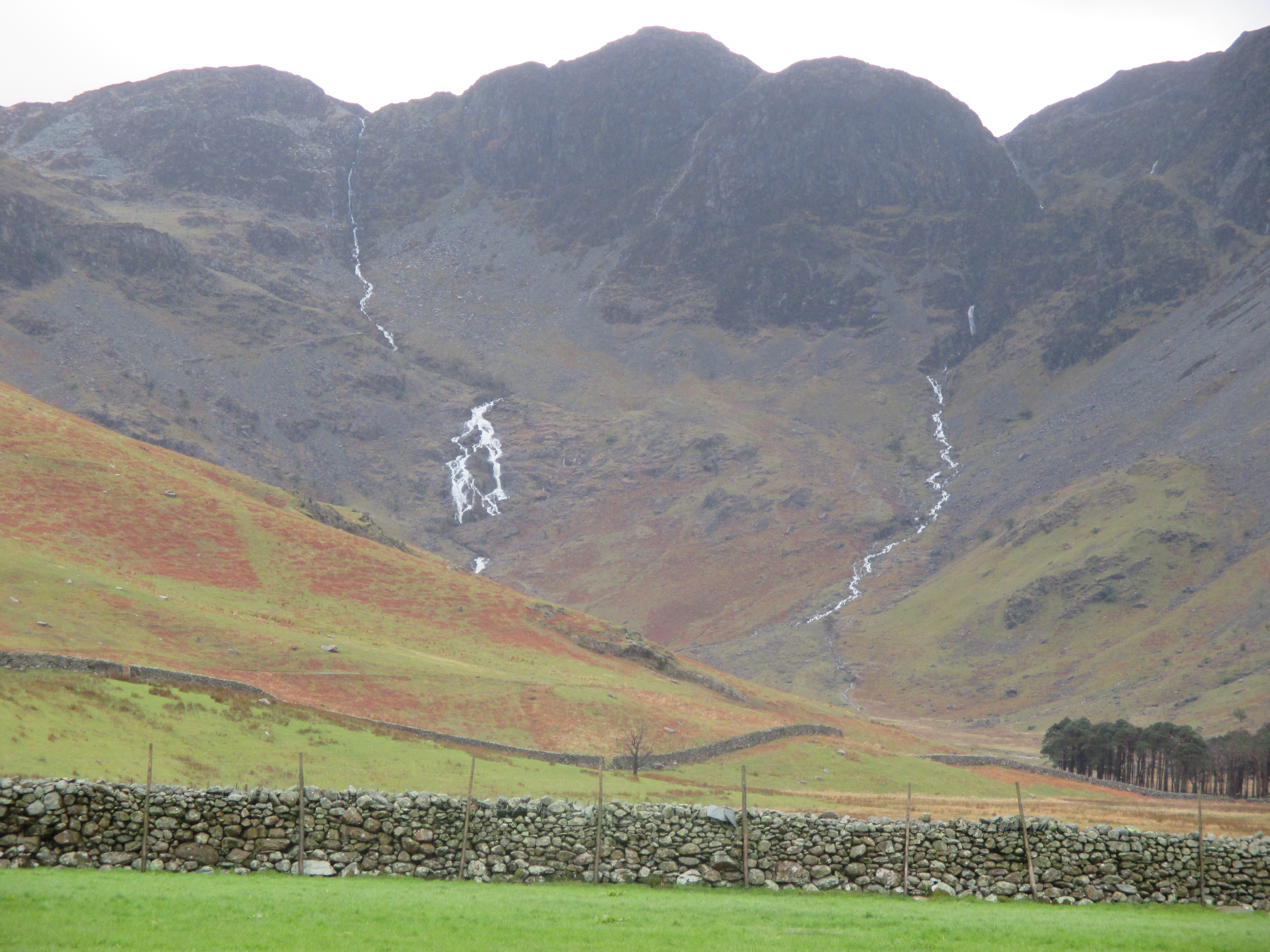
Warnscale, between Haystacks and Fleetwith Pike, with Warnscale Beck to left.

The northern face of Haystacks is topped by crags which giving a soaring curved profile from the settlement of Gatesgarth at their base. On the left in this view is Green Crag, while the highest section, unnamed on Ordnance Survey maps is called Big Stack by Wainwright. Warnscale Beck, one of the feeder streams of Buttermere, runs down beneath Green Crag from its source near Great Round How. There are the remains of extensive quarries on the upper slopes of Warnscale, including Dubs, once served by a tramway from the summit of Honister Pass. Across Warnscale is Fleetwith Pike, a satellite of Grey Knotts.

=== Summit ===
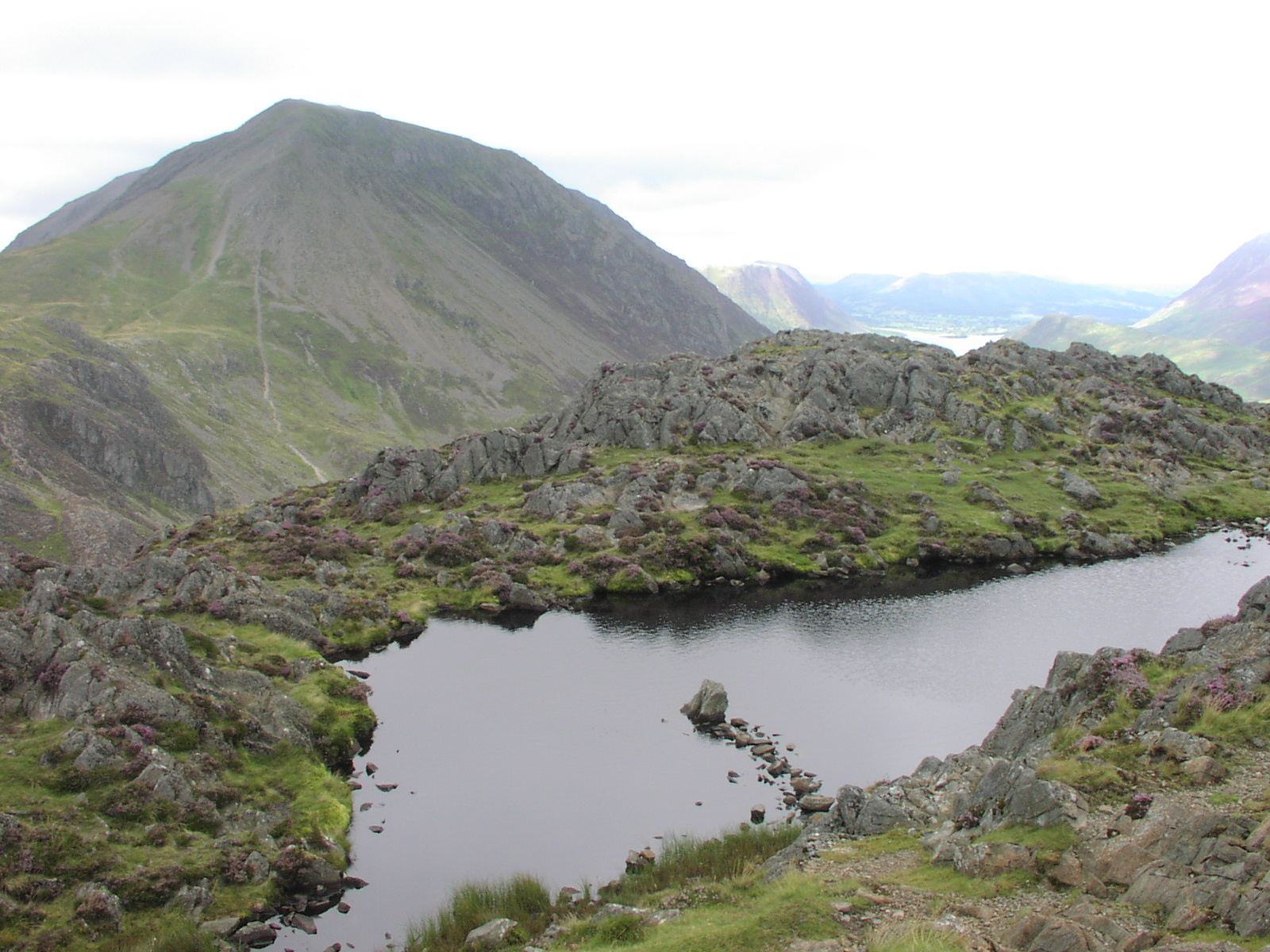
Summit of Haystacks with High Crag behind

The summit sits on a short rocky spine, set at right angles to the ridge. Both ends of the ridge have cairns, that at the northern end being the accepted summit. A lower parallel ridge lies just to the east. The view is excellent, the high points being Gable Crag on Great Gable and the western panorama of Ennerdale Water and High Crag. Crummock Water and Buttermere are also well seen. The foreground picture revolves around Innominate Tarn, lying in full view to the east.

The summit has a number of tarns. The highest is just below the top, generally referred to as the summit tarn but officially unnamed. Halfway along the ridge is Innominate Tarn, a popular beauty spot with an indented rocky shore and a line of tiny islets. At the eastern end is Blackbeck Tarn, a long slender pool which overflows through a cleft in the crags.

== Geology ==
The summit area is composed of flow banded andesite lavas, the Haystacks Member. A minor intrusion of quartz-feldspar-phyric microgranite runs along the crest of the ridge. To the west the Round Hows are examples of bedded breccias sandstone and tuffs.

== Ascents ==
Haystacks is most often climbed from Buttermere, either via the Scarth Gap Pass to the west, or Warnscale in the east. These can be combined to give a fine circuit. A longer variation of the Warnscale route via Dubs Quarry is also possible. Dubs can also be reached from the summit of Honister via the Drum House, significantly reducing the ascent required. Scarth Gap can be reached from Ennerdale to the south, particularly if staying at Black Sail Youth Hostel. Longer outings take in Haystacks indirectly from Brandreth or High Crag.

== Wainwright ==
Haystacks was the favourite summit of influential guidebook author Alfred Wainwright. He neglected to name the fell as a whole in his "best half-dozen" at the end of the Pictorial Guide to the Lakeland Fells because of inferior height, but stated that "for beauty, variety and interesting detail, for sheer fascination and unique individuality, the summit area of Haystacks is supreme. This is in fact the best fell-top of all". Wainwright's ashes were scattered by his wife, Betty, near the shores of Innominate Tarn. In Buttermere's St James's Church, there is a memorial to Wainwright, and one can look out of the window to Haystacks.

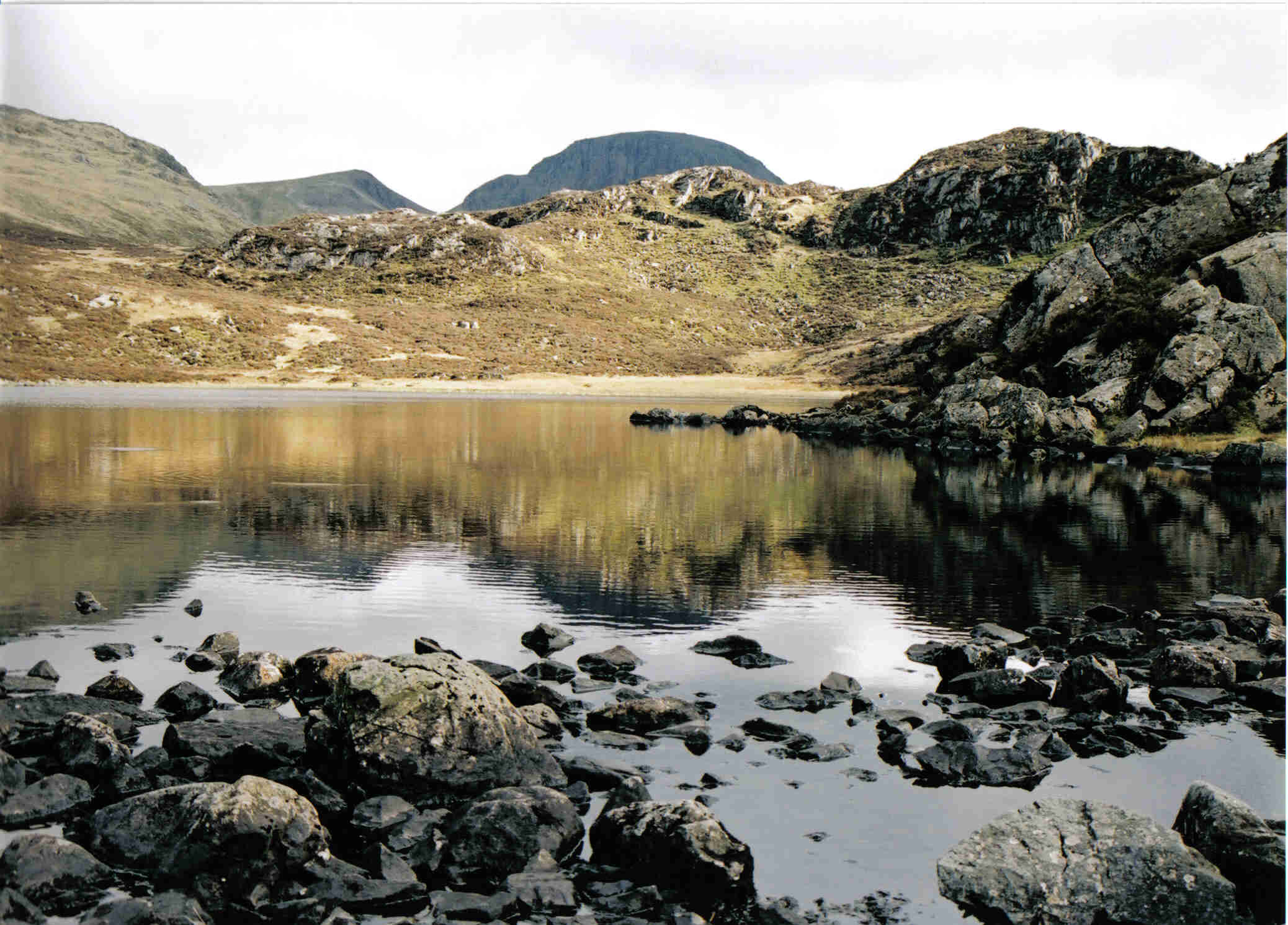
Great Gable from Blackbeck Tarn

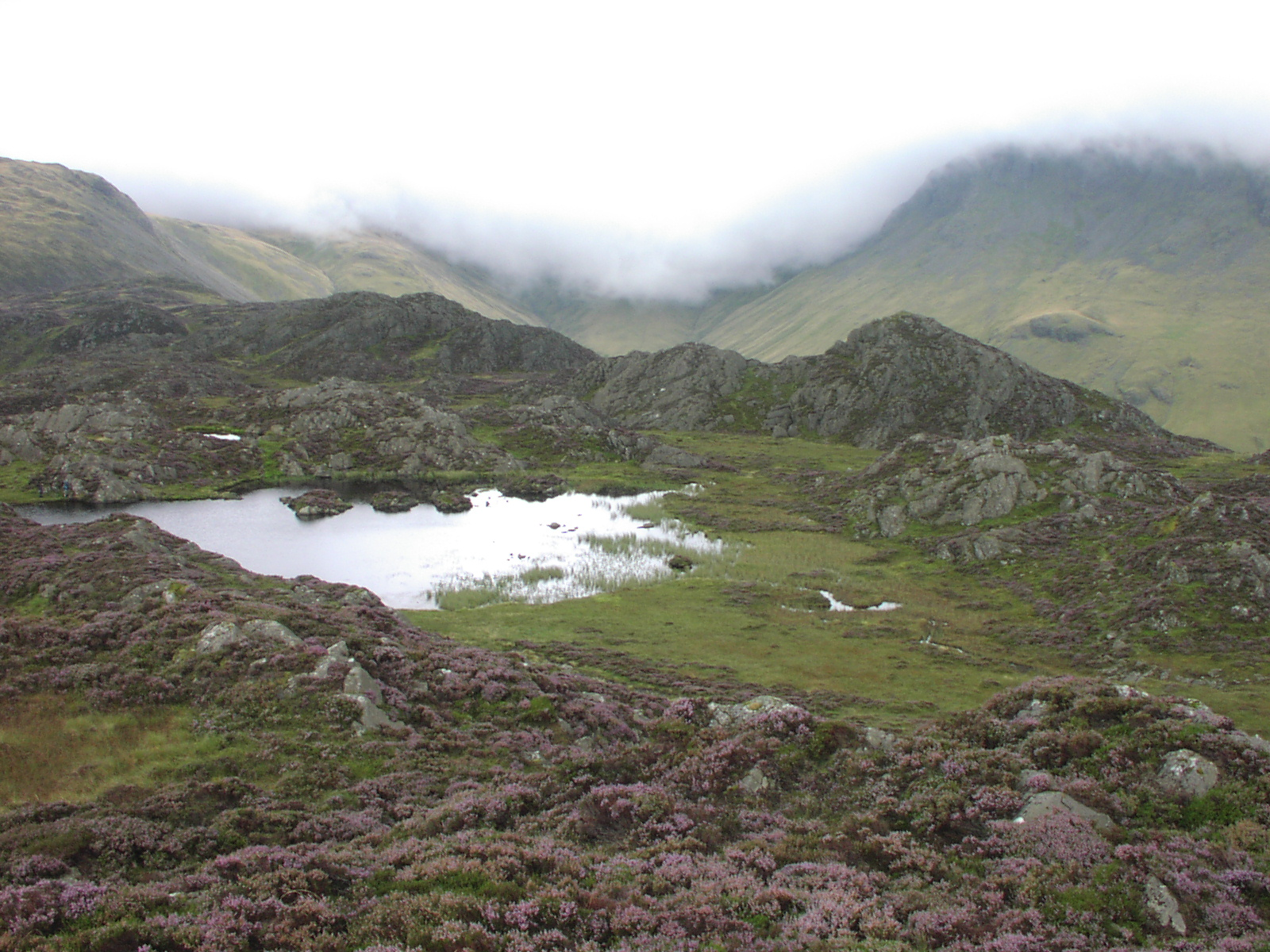
Innominate Tarn

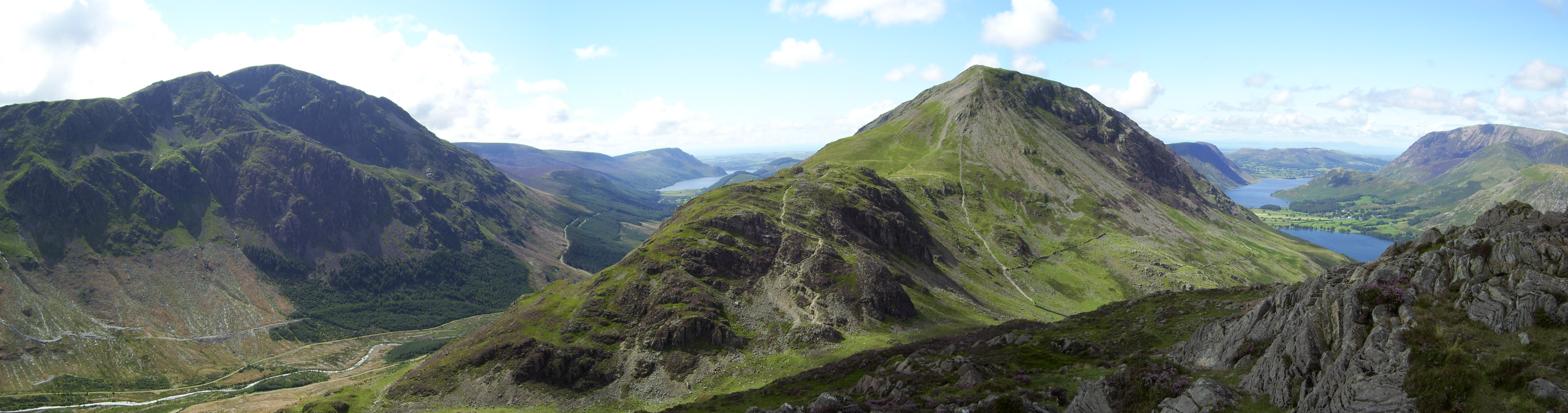
High Crag, Pillar, Buttermere and Crummock Water from Haystacks
