= Loweswater =

Lake in Cumbria, England

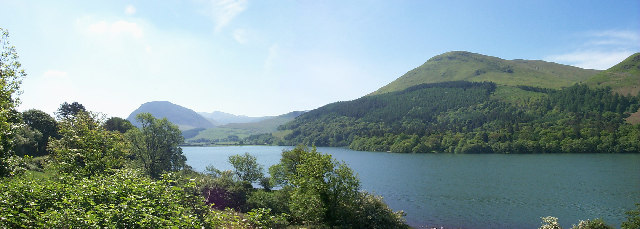
- View from the north side of the lake across to Holme Wood

- Location in the Lake District National Park Location in Allerdale, Cumbria
- Location: Lake District, Cumbria
- Coordinates: 54°34′57″N 3°21′19″W
- Basin countries: United Kingdom
- Max. length: 1.8 km (1.1 mi)
- Max. width: 550 m (0.34 mi)
- Surface area: 60 ha (150 acres)
- Average depth: 8.4 m (28 ft)
- Max. depth: 16 m (52 ft)
- Water volume: 5.4×10^{6} m^{3} (4,400 acre⋅ft)
- Residence time: 150 days

Loweswater is one of the smaller lakes in the English Lake District. The village of Loweswater is situated to the east of the lake.

== Geography ==
The lake is not far from Cockermouth and is also easily reached from elsewhere in West Cumbria. The group of fells to the south of Loweswater is known as the Loweswater Fells and consists of Mellbreak, Gavel Fell, Blake Fell, Hen Comb and Burnbank Fell. To the north of the lake lies the Fellbarrow range.

The lake is unusual in the radial drainage pattern of the Lake District in draining towards the centre of the Lake District: its outfall, Dub Beck, becomes Park Beck and runs east or south-east into the north end of Crummock Water, close to that lake's exit. By way of the River Cocker and River Derwent, Loweswater's contents eventually reach the sea at Workington.

The immediate vicinity of Loweswater consists mainly of rolling hills, in contrast to the rocky mountains found elsewhere in the Lake District (though Mellbreak, part of the Loweswater Fells, is steep and craggy). Loweswater remains relatively untouched by tourism, and is much quieter than the neighbouring lakes, Buttermere and Crummock Water. There is, however, a popular lakeside path, which goes right round the lake. The south side of the lake is the site of Holme Wood, a small forest. Within this forest is Holme Force, a waterfall of great beauty, which is rarely visited as it is not noticeable from the lakeside path. A road follows the north side of the lake, which links the A5086 with the Lorton Vale.

== Toponymy ==
"This is usually assumed (e.g. 'PN Cumb') to be 'the leafy lake' (ON 'laufsær', preserved in various instances of Swed[ish] 'Lövsjö(n)'), with the explanatory 'wæter'/'water' 'lake' added later"

== Sport and leisure ==
Loweswater is owned by the National Trust. Rowing boats can be rented to use on the lake but use of one's own boat is not allowed. Recently the National Trust has done much work on the north side of the lakeside path, cutting down trees to improve views across the lake.

Every year Loweswater is the venue for the Loweswater show, which features traditional Cumbrian sports and has competitions to win farmers' produce
