= Great Borne =

Fell in the Lake District, Cumbria, England

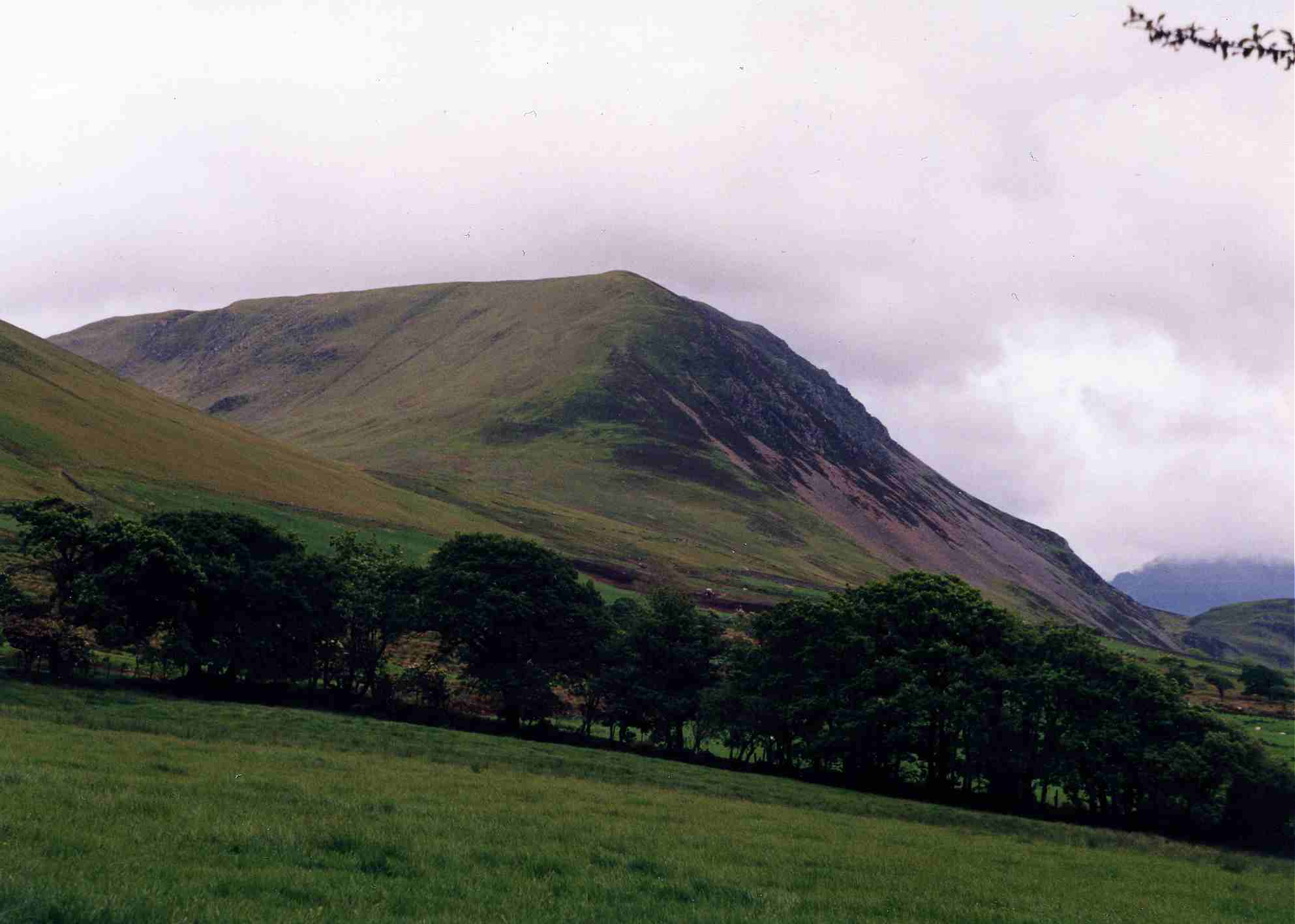
- Great Borne seen from near the western end of Ennerdale Water.

Highest point
- Elevation: 616 m (2,021 ft)
- Prominence: 113 m (371 ft)
- Parent peak: High Stile
- Listing: Hewitt, Nuttall, Wainwright
- Coordinates: 54°32′04″N 3°21′25″W

Geography
- Location within the Lake District Location within the former Allerdale Borough Location within the former Borough of Copeland
- Location: Cumbria, England
- Parent range: Lake District, Western Fells
- OS grid: NY124163
- Topo map: OS Landranger 89, OS Explorer 4

Great Borne is a fell in the English Lake District with a height of 616 m (2,021 ft). It is a rather secluded hill situated at the western end of the long ridge which divides the Ennerdale and Buttermere valleys.

== Name ==
The name Great Borne only really applies to the fell's summit area with most West Cumbrians actually referring to the fell as Herdus. However Bill Birkett in his Complete Lakeland Fells gives Great Borne and Herdus the status of separate fells, with Herdus’ summit standing half a kilometre west of Great Borne with an altitude 562 m (1,844 ft). The meaning of Great Borne translates from the French language meaning "Great Boundary" as in the 13th century the fell denoted the edge of the Loweswater forest, an alternative meaning has been put forward as "Great Stream" from the southern Old English language with bourne meaning a stream flowing from a spring.

== Topography and geology ==
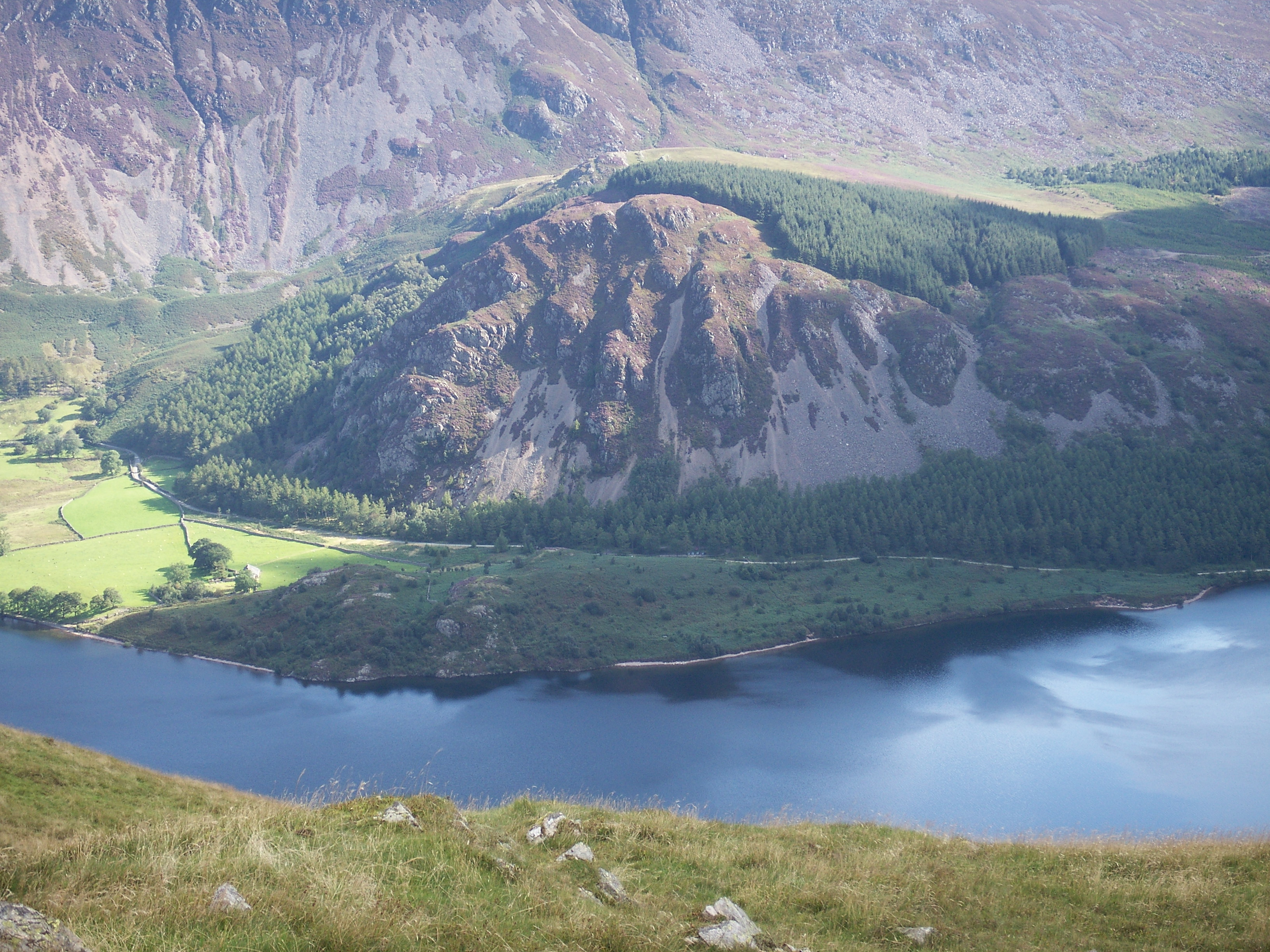
The subsidiary top of Bowness Knott, seen from Crag Fell

Great Borne's southern slopes are of some interest, they fall away precipitously towards Ennerdale Water with steep crags and scree which are composed of pink granophyre rock which give these slopes a reddish tinge (see picture). Approximately halfway between Great Borne and the part of the fell labelled Herdus on the 1:50,000 O.S. map is the boundary between the Skiddaw Group and the Ennerdale Granophyre intrusion.

The outlying low summit of Bowness Knott (333 m (1,093 ft)) also lies to the south. It is a geological Site of Special Scientific Interest (SSSI), showing the granophyre in contact with Skiddaw Slate. Bowness Knott gives good views of Ennerdale Water and is an easy climb from the car park which lies at its foot. Historians have also found evidence of an old (possibly Middle Ages) field system on the lower southern slopes of Great Borne below the crags and scree. The northern flanks of the fell descend to the Floutern Pass, a pedestrian route between Ennerdale and Buttermere. To the east Great Borne is connected to the neighbouring fell of Starling Dodd by a ridge, while the western slopes descend quickly to the low ground of the west Cumbrian plain.

== Ascents ==
Great Borne is customarily climbed from the Ennerdale side of the fell, with the car park beneath Bowness Knott being the usual starting point. The route follows Rake Beck for a short distance and skirts the Herdus crags on the eastern side to gain the summit.

== Summit ==
The summit of the fell has two separate tops divided by a shallow valley, the south top is slightly higher and is marked by an Ordnance Survey trig point and a considerable wind shelter while the northern top has a large cairn which is visible for miles around and gives extensive views of the Loweswater Fells. This large cairn is thought to be the boundary marker from which the fell takes its name.

== Gallery ==
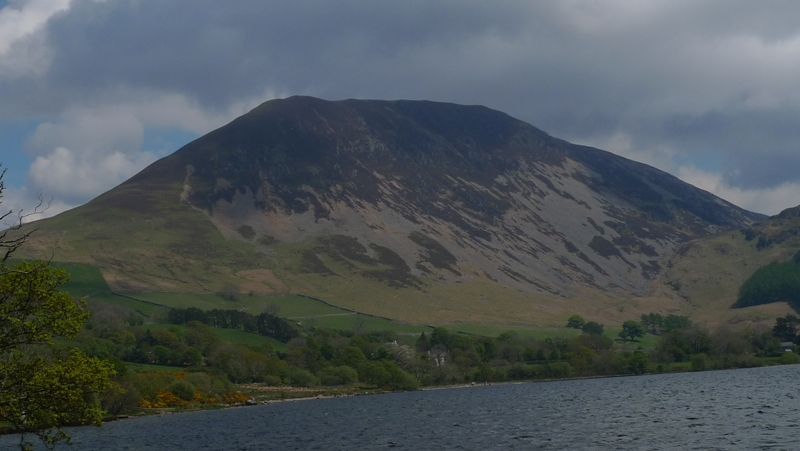
Great Borne seen from Ennerdale Water

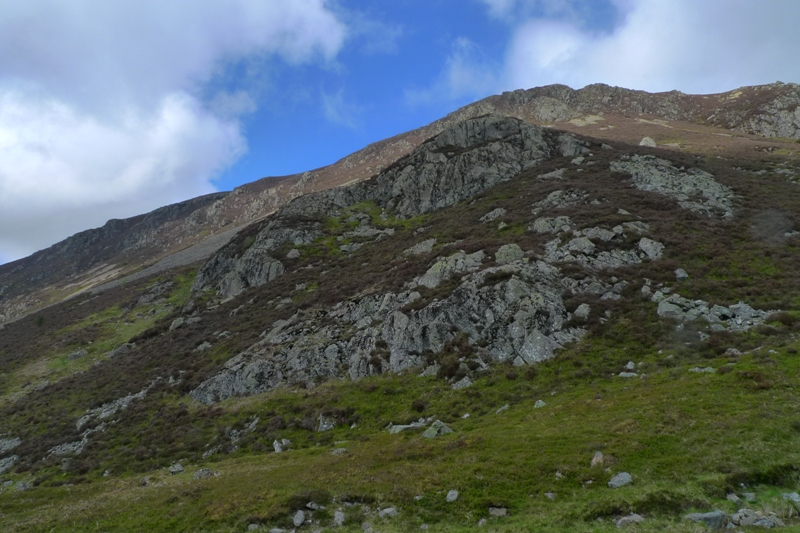
South face of Great Borne

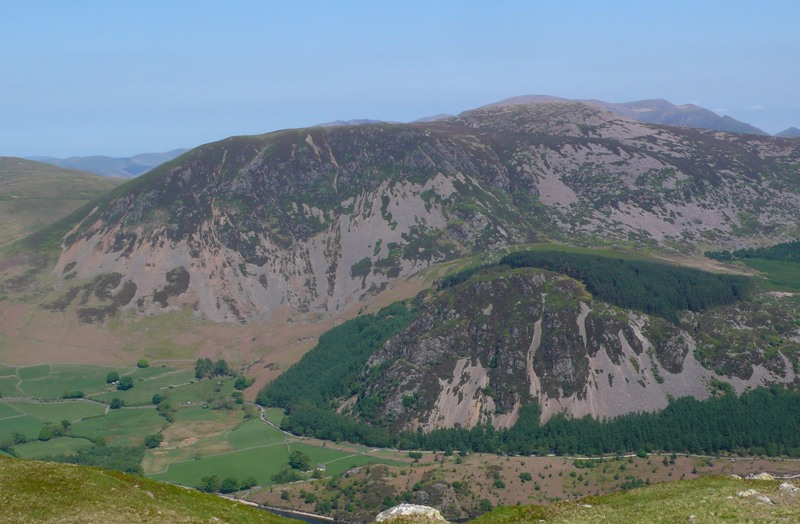
Great Borne from Crag Fell

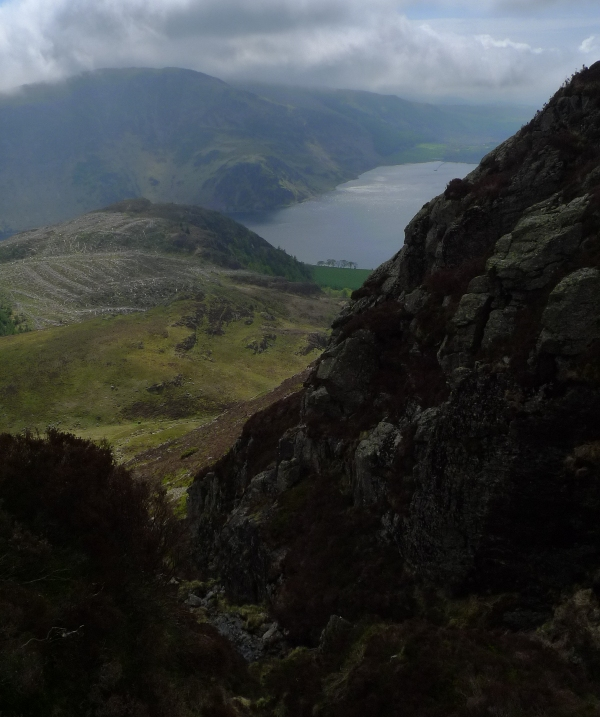
Rake Beck on Great Borne
