= Loweswater (village) =

Village and civil parish in Cumbria, England

Coordinates: 54.576303°N 3.329651°W

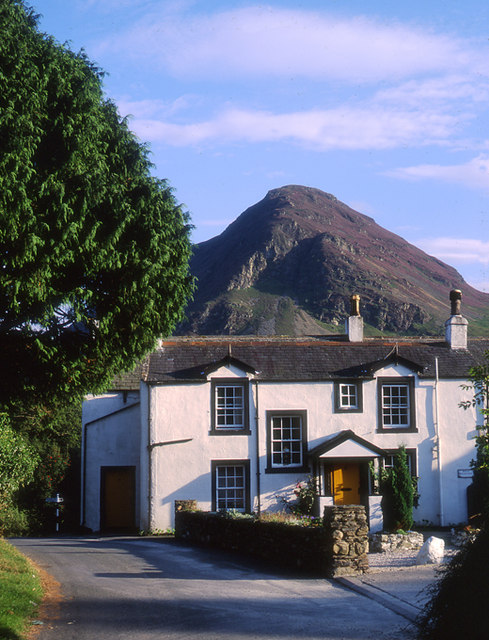
- The Kirkstile Inn with Mellbreak behind

- Location in Allerdale, Cumbria Location within Cumbria
- Population: 231 (2011)
- OS grid reference: NY140209
- Civil parish: Loweswater
- Unitary authority: Cumberland
- Ceremonial county: Cumbria
- Region: North West
- Country: England
- Sovereign state: United Kingdom
- Post town: COCKERMOUTH
- Postcode district: CA13
- Dialling code: 01946
- Police: Cumbria
- Fire: Cumbria
- Ambulance: North West
- UK Parliament: Penrith and Solway

Loweswater is a village and civil parish in the county of Cumbria, England.

== Village ==
Historically part of Cumberland, the village lies between the Lake District lakes of Loweswater and Crummock Water, about 8 miles (13 km) south of Cockermouth and within the Lake District National Park. It is overlooked by the peak of Mellbreak.

The village church, dedicated to St Bartholomew, was built in 1827, and restored in 1884, although there has been a place of worship in the village since the early 12th century. Near to the church is the popular Kirkstile Inn.

== Civil parish ==
The civil parish of Loweswater covers a considerable area around the village, and is bordered on its eastern side by the western shore of Crummock Water and by the River Cocker. To the north-west, the parish boundary is delineated by the summit of Fellbarrow, before encircling Loweswater lake via Low Fell and the A5086 road. From here, the parish boundary includes a large area of fell to the north and east of the summits of Blake Fell, Gavel Fell, Great Borne, Starling Dodd and Red Pike, before descending to Crummock Water.

Besides the village of Loweswater itself, the parish also includes the settlement of Mockerkin, to the west of Loweswater lake. Most of the parish lies within the Lake District National Park, but a small part at its western end, including Mockerkin, is outside the National Park. At the time of the 2001 census the parish had a population of 209 living in 92 households.

For local government purposes the civil parish forms part of the Cumberland unitary authority area, within the county of Cumbria. It is within the Penrith and Solway constituency of the United Kingdom Parliament.

== See also ==
- Listed buildings in Loweswater, Cumbria
