= Honister Slate Mine =

Slate mine in Cumbria in the United Kingdom

Coordinates: 54°30′38″N 3°11′46″W

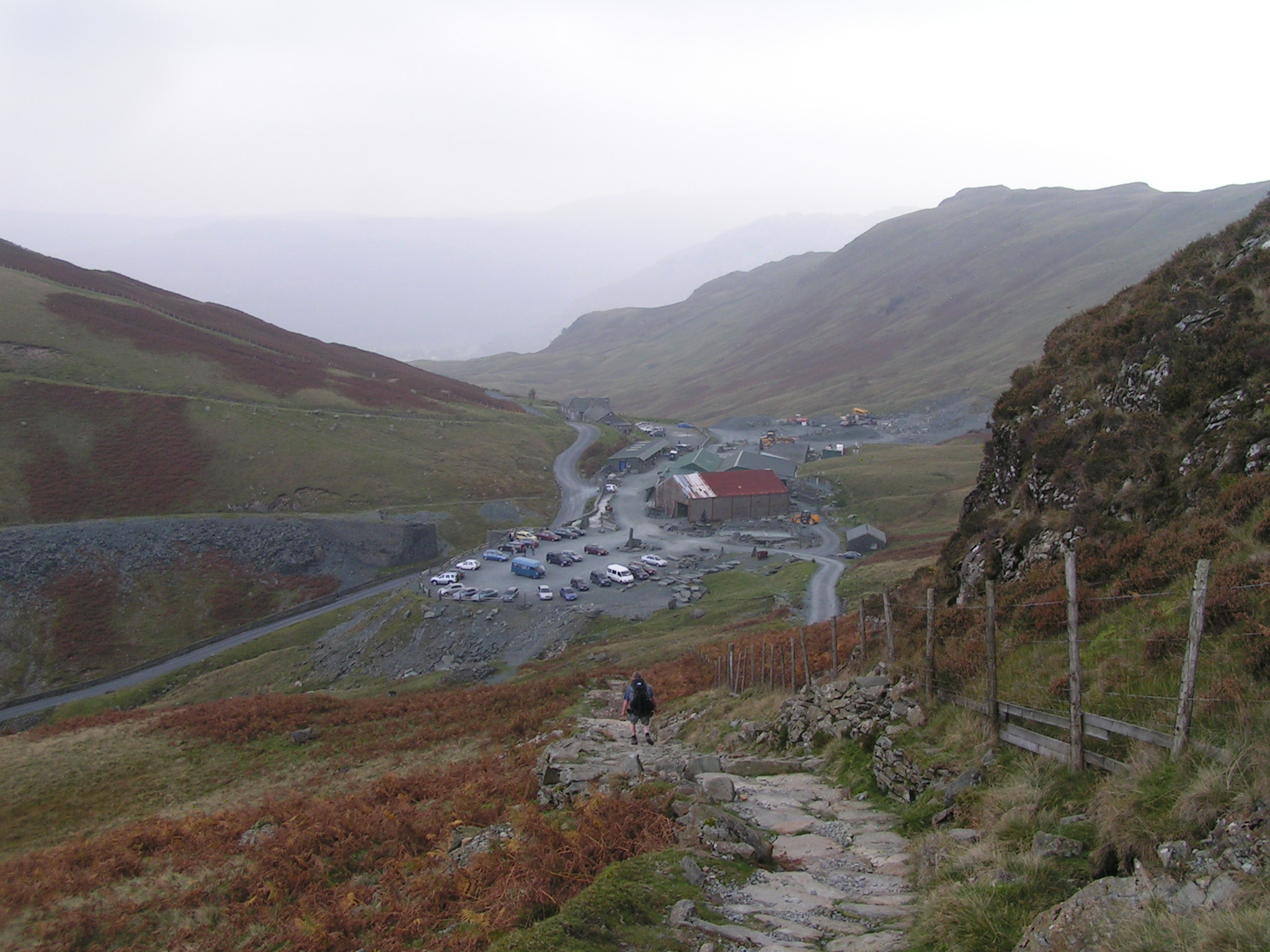
Honister Slate Mine from Fleetwith to the west.

The Honister Slate Mine in Cumbria is a working slate mine in England. Quarrying for Westmorland green slate has been taking place in the area since the late 17th century. Apart from the mining it is also a popular tourist attraction in the Lake District National Park.

== History ==
Opencast quarrying had been carried out at Honister since the late 17th century.

=== 19th century ===
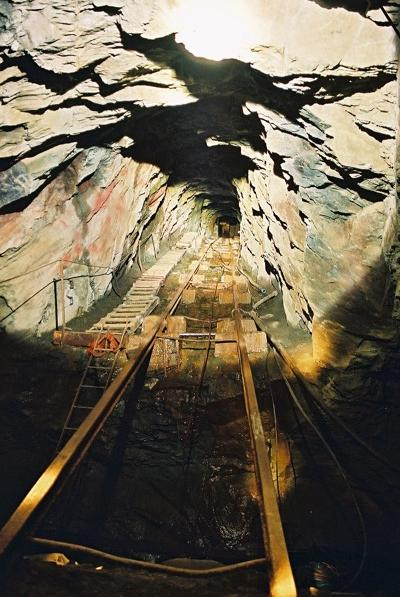
A 50 degree incline within the Honister Slate Mine.

By 1870 Honister's underground workings stretched under Honister Crag with intermediate workings on the opposite side of the valley at Yew Crags. There were smaller-scale underground workings on Dubbs Moor, together with a small opencast quarry. Packhorse teams were used to remove the finished slate on sleds from mines. This involved bringing the loads down steep paths that traversed the cliffs to the top of Honister Pass (The Hause). Dubbs mine was known for its "smaller metal" (metal being the terminology for slate), in that smaller pieces of slate (thus smaller slates) were obtainable due to the geology; but this did give rise to some instability.

In 1879 the mine's new owners - who also leased and operated other quarries in Borrowdale - installed self-acting inclines to serve both the Honister and Yew Crags mines. Despite the cost to build these feats of engineering, the financial outlay was justified as they improved efficiency in the mines. For instance the Dubbs Quarry incline allowed slate to be pulled up and then down into the valley to The Hause.

By 1888 production had reached 2,598 tons a year.

=== 20th century ===
A close up of a polished slab of green Westmorland Green Slate from Honister.

The mines reverted to care and maintenance for a while due to labour shortages in First World War. However it did not take long for production to recommence after the cessation of hostilities. By 1926, following a change of management and a new Resident Director, Robin Hoare, the mine's fortunes began to improve with significantly increased production. Considerable modifications were undertaken throughout the quarries, such as the works at The Hause being electrified with two Ruston 4-cylinder diesel generators.

The new Kimberley Mine was started from the Road End Level, with a substantial 600-foot (183 m) long 14 ft × 14 ft (4.3 m × 4.3 m) electrically powered incline. Work also began to implement a proposal (that had first been suggested in the mid-1890s) to drive a level through to the Dubbs Quarries. About 100 m (330 ft) of level was completed before the project was shelved in favour of further developing the more significant workings under Honister Crag. In 1932, Dubbs Quarry ceased production largely due to the difficulties and slowness of transporting finished slate.

Despite an enforced closure from 1943 to 1945 during the Second World War production continued through the 1950s and 1960s although Yew Crag mine closed at that time due to difficult roof conditions.

=== Closure ===
In 1981, all the quarries of the Buttermere & Westmorland Green Slate Co. Ltd. were acquired by B. R. Moore and his father, R. D. Moore. The pair introduced a programme of improvement and a large amount of capital investment was undertaken. This included the installation of rail-borne EIM-Co Rockershovels, battery locomotives, improved rolling stock and increased specialist underground mechanisation and systems (the Moores were helped by their General Manager, Jim Peart, of Weardale mining - previously manager of the Burtree Pasture, Rookhope, and Stanhope Burn lead and fluorspar mines).

In 1985 the Moore family sold the company and its quarries to Alfred McAlpine plc which also owned Penrhyn Quarry in Bethesda, North Wales. McAlpine used an earlier planning permission to open a new opencast (on the Dubbs side of Honister Crag), on the Honister Vein some 200 m (660 ft) from the Hopper Opencast (Kimberley Vein), which was then infilled with waste from the new workings. In 1989 McAlpine ceased operations at all the quarries. Only care and maintenance was undertaken.

=== Reopening & resurgence ===
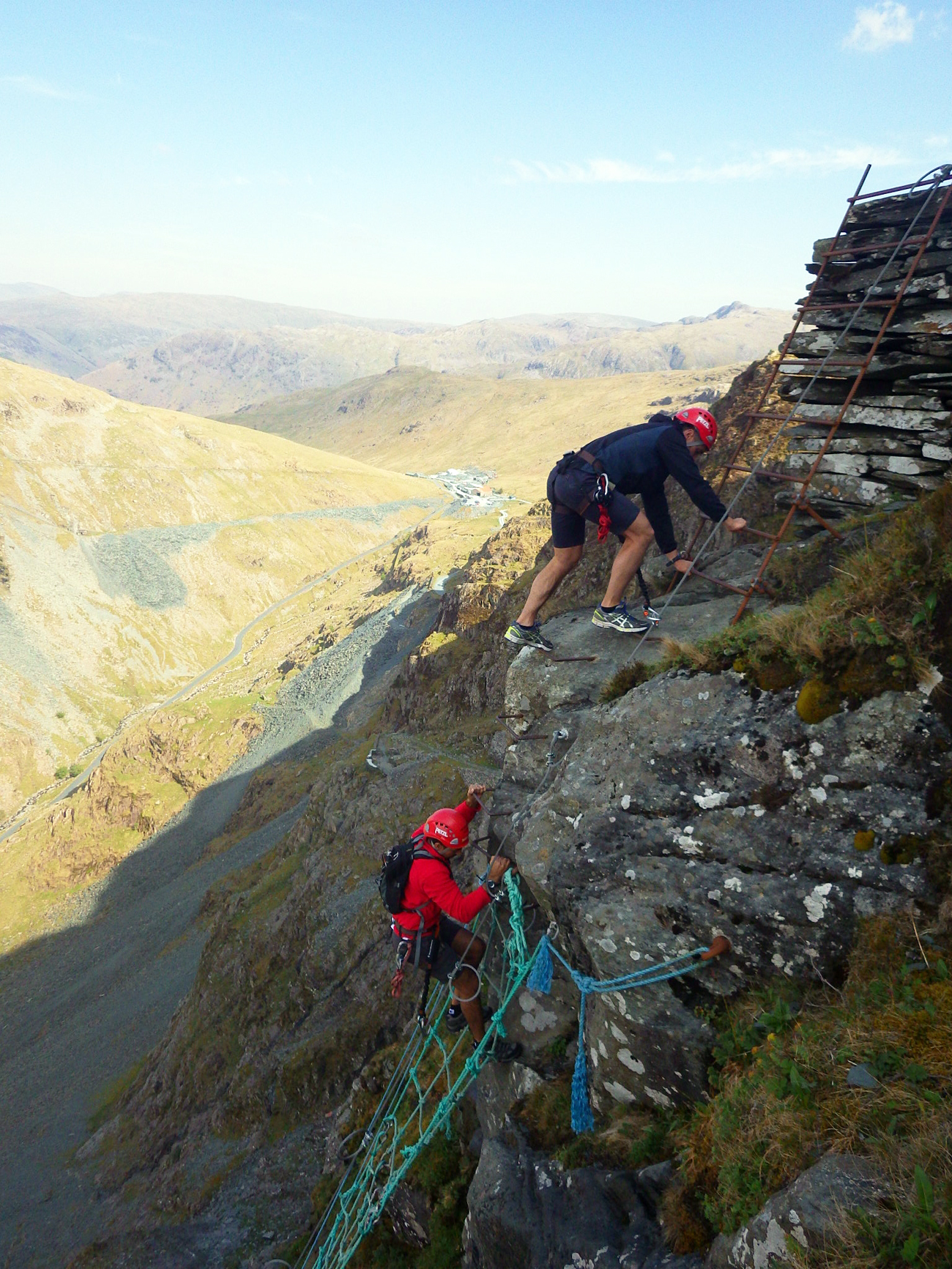
The via ferrata at Honister Pass

In 1997 the mine was reopened by local businessman, Mark Weir, who redeveloped the mining side - producing small quantities of roofing slate - and who also turned the site into a tourist attraction.

A 600 mm (1 ft 11 5/8 in) narrow gauge industrial railway was used to assist in the slate extraction process.

Attractions around the mine complex include a visitor centre, underground tours of the workings, and England's first via ferrata, where participants use a safety harness to scale a cliff path. This attraction proved to be very popular and in 2011 was awarded winner of "best tourism experience in the Lake District" by Cumbria Tourism. Using the original miners' track up the steep outer incline of Fleetwith Pike is both physically and mentally challenging.

== Zip wire ==
Honister Mine featured in the 2011 BBC television programme Tales from the National Park. It followed owner Mark Weir, and his attempt to open a zip wire from the top of Fleetwith Pike to the mine below. Weir died in a helicopter crash in March 2011 (during the making of the programme). He had been trying to obtain planning permission for the proposed zip wire. His business was also facing a prosecution on the part of Natural England in respect of damage to plants within a designated Site of Special Scientific Interest (Honister Crag SSSI). The damage was related to an unapproved extension to the via ferrata which Weir had initiated.

A 2012 planning application for the zip wire was refused by the Lake District National Park Authority on the grounds of impact, despite support from explorer and Lake District resident Chris Bonington and notable business and tourism organisations.

Permission was granted for the 1 kilometre (0.62 miles) long zip wire in 2018.

== See also ==
- British narrow gauge slate railways

== Sources ==
- Adams, John (1995). Mines of the Lake District. Dalesman. ISBN 978-0852069318.
- Tyler, Ian (1994). Honister – The History of a Lakeland slate mine. Blue Rock Publications. ISBN 978-0952302803.
