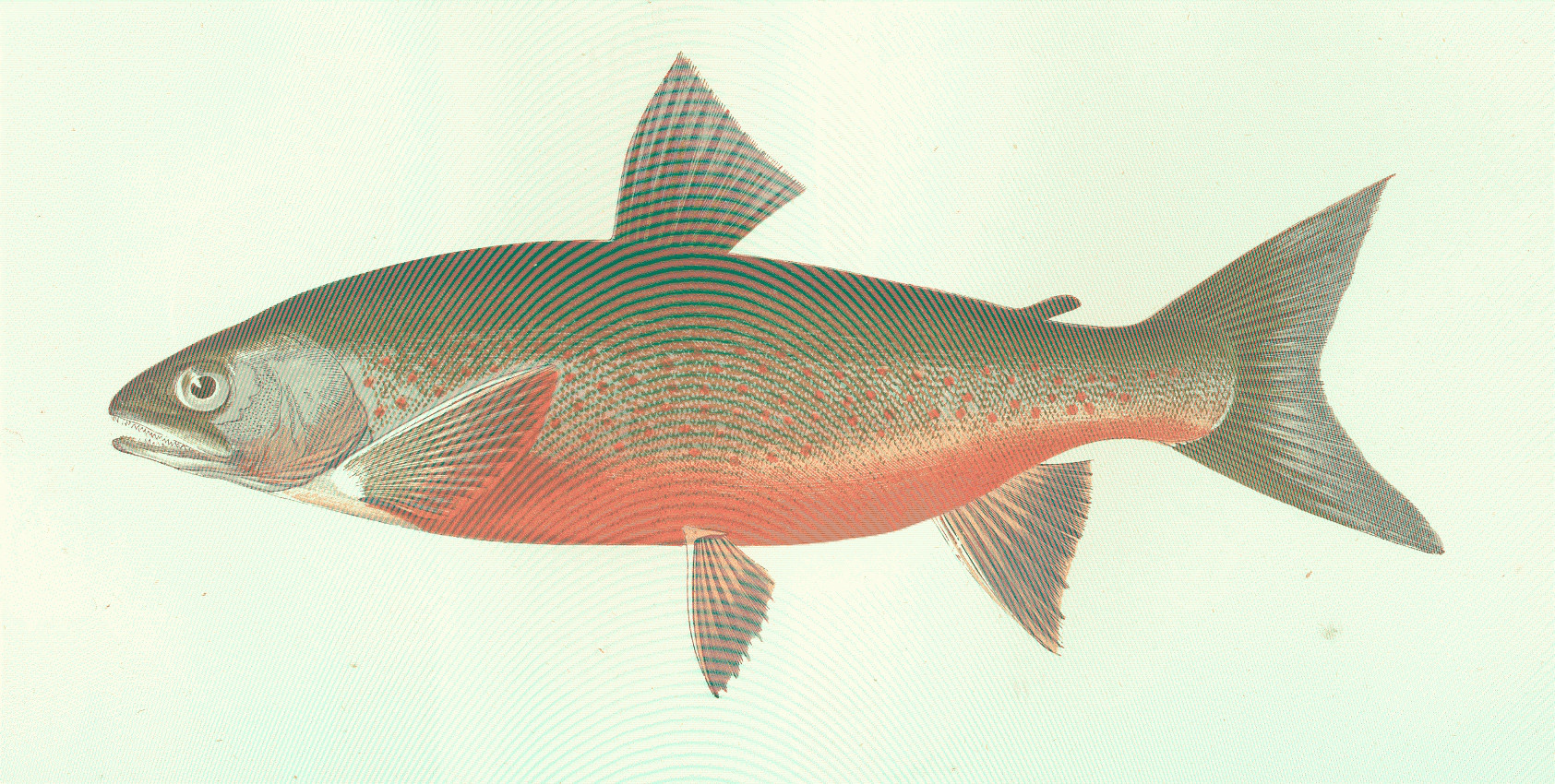

Conservation status
- Critically Endangered (IUCN 3.1)

Scientific classification
- Kingdom: Animalia
- Phylum: Chordata
- Class: Actinopterygii
- Order: Salmoniformes
- Family: Salmonidae
- Genus: Salvelinus
- Species: S. willughbii

Binomial name
- Salvelinus willughbii (Günther, 1862)

= Salvelinus willughbii =

Species of fish

Salvelinus willughbii, also known as the Windermere charr or Willoughby's charr, is a cold-water fish in the family Salmonidae. Its binomial species name commemorates Francis Willughby. They are remnants from the end of the last ice age, landlocked and isolated in various lakes within Cumbria, England. S. willughbii is a subspecies of Arctic charr that inhabit Lake Windermere, Coniston Water, Wast Water, Ennerdale Water, Buttermere, Crummock Water, and Loweswater in The Lake District of Cumbria, England. The species has been listed on the IUCN Red List as Critically Endangered due to increased water temperatures, decreased levels of oxygen and overfishing within Lake Windermere.

== Description ==
In the autumn and winter months, Salvelinus willughbii possess long bodies with dark colouration on the top dorsal side, grey colouration near the medial line, and muddled pink colouration on ventral side with a white belly. Light pink spots run along the body above and slightly below the medial line. Both dorsal and caudal fins are dark along with muddled pink colouration of the pelvic, anal, and pectoral fins. The head is dark on the top portion and silver on the cheeks. In the spring and summer months, colouration lightens and the back turns from dark to blue or even olive in colour. Colouration on the belly turns more vibrant as well as the colouration on the pelvic, anal, and pectoral fins. The head of adult males are conical, and sharper compared to adult females who have a more rounded appearance. The mouth in all specimens is white on the lower portion and occasionally dark on the upper portion.

Normal adult S. willughbii on average reach lengths of 10–12 inches (25–30 cm) and can reach lengths of up to 18 inches (46 cm). Adult males on average range from 9–14 ounces (260–400 g) in weight while females generally range from 8–13 ounces (230–370 g). The largest recorded specimen from the Lake District caught in 1973 weighed 1 pound 11 ounces (765 g). Dwarf variants do not get as large as the normal type and reach sizes of 7.5 to 8.5 inches (190 to 220 mm). Dwarf charr on average weigh anywhere from 2.5–4.2 ounces (71–119 g).

== Distribution ==
S. willughbii in keepnet, captured by the Environmental Agency of Cumbria, England

This specific subspecies is found in several lakes within The Lake District of Cumbria, England. Lakes that are confirmed to hold populations of S. willughbii include: Lake Windermere, Coniston Water, Wast Water, Ennerdale Water, Buttermere, Crummock Water, and Loweswater. Historically, a population of S. willughbii resided in Goat's Water but is now thought to be extinct.

== Diet ==
S. willughbii often consume a diet of small planktonic organisms, copepods, and diplostracan species in the mid-water and bottom dwelling invertebrates off the bottom. In the late spring and summer months they feed primarily on small mid-water organisms and insects. During spawning periods in the winter and early spring months charr eggs are also a staple.

S. willughbii captured by "Wild Ennerdale"

== Spawning ==
S. willughbii seek rocky areas where roughly acorn-sized stones and larger are prevalent. Depth and time of year that spawning occurs depends on the population present within a given lake. Early in the spawning season, males will move into a chosen area and will wait for females to enter the spawning ground. Once females enter a spawning ground, they will begin to disturb or dig the gravel using their tail and making a slight indentation into a chosen spot. When a male mate is found following the digging of a bed, the act of spawning occurs between the male and female. Once eggs have been deposited into the nest and fertilized, the female once again digs gravel using her tail and covers the eggs. Males are known to stay on nests longer, most likely for protection.

=== Windermere ===
There are two spawning populations within Windermere that spawn during different times of the year. Spawning occurs in both autumn and springtime, mainly in the months of November and February respectively. In autumn, most spawning beds are found in shallow areas (3–12 ft (0.91–3.66 m)) in either the lake or the River Brathay. In springtime, spawning occurs in the main lake and in deep water (50–70 ft (15–21 m)).

=== Coniston Water ===
Spawning occurs primarily in the month of March in roughly 40 feet (10 m) of water.

=== Ennerdale Water ===
Spawning occurs in early November and occurs in the River Liza connecting to the main lake; however, depth is unknown.

=== Haweswater, Buttermere, Crummock Water ===
Spawning occurs in main lakes during January and is thought to be in water ranging from 30–60 feet (9.1–18.3 m) deep.

== Ecology ==
=== Conservation status ===
S. willughbii (under the name Willoughby's Charr) is currently classified as Critically Endangered according to the IUCN Red List.

==== Conservation efforts ====
Decreased oxygen levels and increases in water temperature are becoming an ever-increasing threat to S. willughbii populations. In Windermere, sewage plants have dumped large amounts of waste into the lake and created anoxic conditions through eutrophication. With the increased sewage content and water temperatures, algal blooms have been prevalent. Since 1992 phosphate stripping has been employed at wastewater treatment plants surrounding Lake Windermere to combat algal blooms. However, runoff from land continues to present problems and attempts are being made to manage the amount of phosphate that enters the lake. In Ennerdale Water, spawning grounds found in the River Liza have been subject to blockage through a man-made pipe bridge. This bridge restricted the flow of adequate size gravel to pass through the river and make it to spawning grounds close to the lake. Acidification of water within the river also proved problematic from the non-native tree litter that fell into the waters. In recent times, efforts have been made to assist the charr population within Ennerdale Water and led to the removal of the pipe bridge and replanting of native trees surrounding the River Liza.

==== Invasive species ====
The introduction of invasive species to waters within the Lake District have provided increased competition for native charr populations. Such species as common roach feed on the same food sources as S. willughbii and are an increasingly detrimental factor as roach populations grow larger.

S. willughbii, captured by the Environmental Agency in Cumbria, England

=== Fishing ===
Most fishing done in recent years within the Lake District consists of hand lining techniques that are a traditional practice as well as rod-and-reel fishing. Catches have reportedly been lower among fisherman as populations continue to decline. Commercial fishing using nets was reported to have started as early as the late 17th century and was stopped due to concerns of population size in the early 20th century.

=== Parasite interactions ===
S. willughbii residing in Lake Windermere have been found to be infected with a species of zoonotic tapeworm Diphyllobothrium dendriticum. North basin fish are thought to have a higher level of infection compared to those in the south basin. Differences in infection level are also present among spring and autumn spawners. Not much is known about the effects of the tapeworm on the fish, however in most cases it is usually insignificant.
