= Honister Crag SSSI =

UK Site of Special Scientific Interest

Honister Crag
- Site of Special Scientific Interest
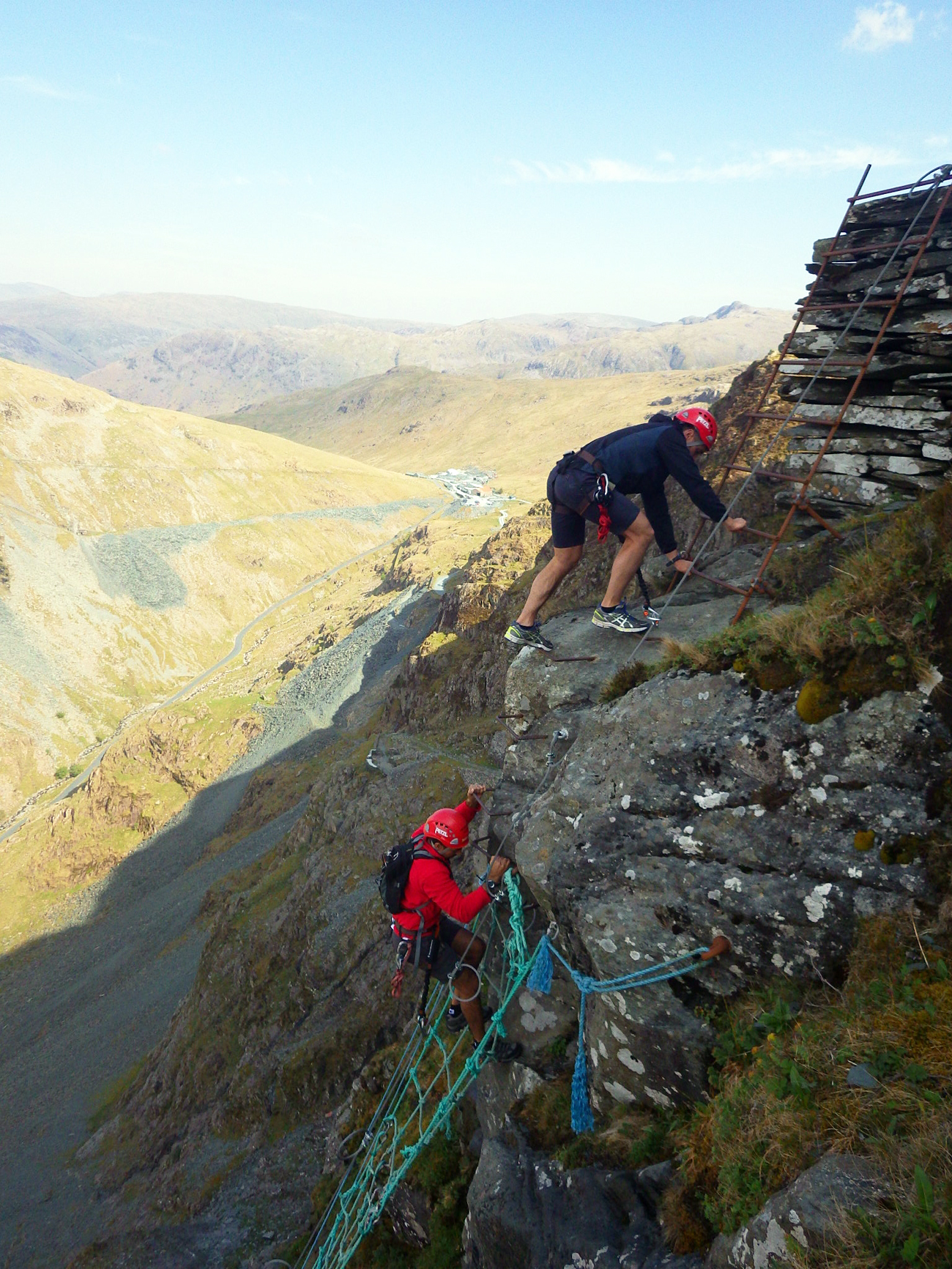
- Honister´s via ferrata with Honister Pass in the background
- Location of Honister Crag.
- Interest: Biological and geological
- Notification date: 1988
- Location map: Magic Map

Honister Crag SSSI is a Site of Special Scientific Interest in Cumbria, England. It is designated for both biological and geological interest. The site covers an area of 302.9 hectares (1.170 sq mi) on Honister Crag, from which it takes its name, and Fleetwith Pike, an adjacent fell.

With other SSSIs in the English Lake District, it forms part of the Lake District High Fells Special Area of Conservation It is separated from one of the other SSSIs, Buttermere Fells, by the B5289 road.

== Biology ==
The site is important for its plants and provides one of the best examples of species-rich upland ledge communities in West Cumbria. It supports a mixture of montane and lowland species.

=== Management ===
English Nature (the predecessor organisation of Natural England) identified (in 2004) a need to:

- control grazing stock (overgrazing has also affected other sites in the Lake District High Fells SAC)
- manage human access

In 2011 Natural England successfully prosecuted Honister Slate Mine for damaging the SSSI. The mine had been redeveloped by a local businessman as a tourist attraction, and the facilities included an unapproved extension to an existing via ferrata and a zip wire. It was noted their use by paying members of the public caused significant damage to the vegetation through trampling.

In November 2018 the Lake District National Park Authority approved a planning application from the Slate Mine for a zip wire running 1 km from Fleetwith Pike (a longer wire than the one which was the subject of controversy in 2011)). The Cumbria Wildlife Trust expressed concern that damage would be caused to alpine flowers.

== Geology ==
There are important exposures of rocks of the Skiddaw Group in contact with lavas and tuffs of the Borrowdale Volcanic Group.

=== Management ===
According to English Nature (which became Natural England in 2006), the "ideal management for natural inland geological sites is the maintenance of rock exposure free of vegetation and, in some cases, the build-up of rock debris".

== Other levels of protection ==
=== Special Area of Conservation ===
Since 2005 the SSSI has been protected under the Habitats Directive (European Union legislation) as part of the multi-site Special Area of Conservation known as Lake District High Fells. This designation was made in respect of the biological rather than the geological interest of the sites concerned. The SAC also includes Buttermere Fells SSSI.

=== World Heritage Site ===
The SSSI is within the Lake District National Park, which was designated a World Heritage Site in 2017 as a cultural landscape.

== See also ==
- Fleetwith Pike
