= Listed buildings in Ennerdale and Kinniside =

Ennerdale and Kinniside is a civil parish in the Cumberland district, Cumbria, England. It contains four listed buildings that are recorded in the National Heritage List for England. All the listed buildings are designated at Grade II, the lowest of the three grades, which is applied to "buildings of national importance and special interest". The parish is in the Lake District National Park, and contains the settlements of Ennerdale Bridge and Croasdle, but most of it consists of countryside, moorland and mountain. The listed buildings comprise a house, a farmhouse and stable, a packhorse bridge, and a telephone kiosk.

== Buildings ==
Name and location	Photograph	Date	Notes
Longmoor Head farmhouse and stable 54.52781°N 3.44825°W	—	1686	The stable is to the north of the farmhouse, which has a rear extension added in the 19th century. The buildings are pebbledashed, and the house has chamfered eaves, and a slate roof with a south coped gable. There are two storeys and three bays. On the front of the house is a gabled porch and casement windows. The rear extension has angle pilasters, a string band, sash windows, and dove openings. Inside are the remains of an inglenook fireplace. The stable has a plank door, a window, and a loft door.
Bowness; 54.52717°N 3.38004°W	—	Late 17th to early 18th century (probable)	A pebbledashed house on a boulder plinth with a slate roof. It has a single storey with an attic, three bays, and a full-width outshut at the rear. There is a central gabled porch, and casement windows, those in the upper floor in dormers. Inside the house are crucks and an inglenook.
Monk's Bridge; 54.47903°N 3.44607°W		17th or 18th century	A packhorse bridge over the River Calder. It is in sandstone and consists of a single pointed arch with a span of about 18 feet (5.5 m). The bridge has a pathway about 3 feet (0.91 m) wide, without any parapets. It is also a scheduled monument.
Telephone kiosk 54.54439°N 3.40257°W	—	1935	A K6 type telephone kiosk, designed by Giles Gilbert Scott. Constructed in cast iron with a square plan and a dome, it has three unperforated crowns in the top panels.
