= River Ehen =

River in Cumbria, England

Coordinates: 54°26′N 3°31′W

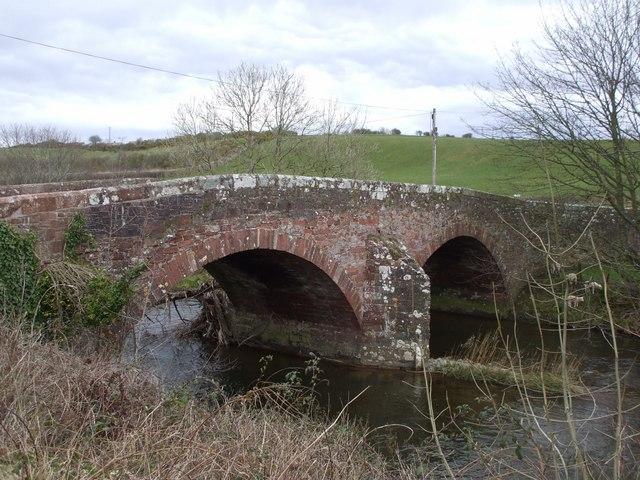
Ehen at Kersey Bridge

The River Ehen is a river in Cumbria, England.

The river's source is at the west end of Ennerdale Water: it runs west through Ennerdale Bridge where it is joined by Croasdale Beck (flowing from Banna Fell). Ennerdale Water itself is fed by the River Liza.

The Ehen continues past Cleator Moor and Cleator, where it is fed by the River Keekle, moving southwards through Egremont and eventually running parallel to the Irish Sea which it eventually joins at Sellafield at the same point as the River Calder.

== Wildlife ==
The river supports the largest freshwater pearl mussel population in England.

The river is a breeding ground for Atlantic salmon. There is widespread poaching along the length of the river.

== Environmental protection ==
The river Ehen was designated a Special Area of Conservation in 2005. The section of the coast into which it flows was designated as the Cumbria Coast Marine Conservation Zone in 2013.

The Ehen is home to the Ennerdale black pearl, a rare black pearl formed in freshwater pearl mussels. It is the only river in England to be part of the project "Pearls in Peril", funded by the European Union's LIFE + NATURE Programme. The project aims to conserve the species at 21 sites in the UK. The freshwater pearl mussel relies for part of its life on the presence of salmonids, a group of fish including salmon and trout.

Sellafield has previously used water from the River Ehen for cooling on the site, but ceased this operation in the 1990s. There is a weir on Ennerdale Water, and as at 2016 the valley continues to be an important source of drinking water for customers of United Utilities in West Cumbria. However, there are plans to supply these customers using a new pipeline from Thirlmere because the Environment Agency has confirmed that for environmental reasons it will rescind the abstraction licence for Ennerdale. This means United Utilities must stop using it as a source of water by 2025 at the latest, and therefore will need to find one or more alternative sources of water.
