= Girt dog of Ennerdale =

Livestock killing dog

The Girt Dog of Ennerdale (also known as the Vampire Dog of Ennerdale or Demon Dog of Ennerdale) was a dog believed to have killed between 300 and 400 sheep in the fells of Cumberland, England, from May to September 1810.

The adjective "girt" is Cumbrian for "great".

== Killing spree ==
The dog was first observed by Thornholme resident Mr Mossop on 10 May 1810, and began killing and eating local sheep shortly afterwards. Its origins are uncertain, although it was speculated that the dog had escaped from "some gipsy troop." The dog was a mongrel, variously described as a "large, brindled, tiger-striped dog" and "a smooth haired dog of a tawny mouse-colour, with dark streaks in tiger-fashion over its hide." Some suggested it may have been a cross between a mastiff and a greyhound. One witness, Will Rotherby, who was knocked down by the beast, described it as lion-like.

The Girt Dog of Ennerdale would usually kill livestock at night. At the height of its killing spree, it killed seven or eight sheep in a single night, sometimes devouring its victims while they were still alive. According to one account, the dog would drink the sheep's blood directly from the jugular vein. Throughout its killing spree, the dog was "never known to utter a vocal sound". Although local residents would often chase the Girt Dog with their own hounds, these pursuits always proved fruitless and the dog usually returned to killing sheep within a few days. Residents tried to lure the Girt Dog within shooting distance using bitches in heat, but without success. Poisoning, too, was also attempted, but abandoned to avoid accidentally poisoning the locals' own dogs. As the Girt Dog continued to evade hunters, it became a popular topic of conversation in Ennerdale and Kinniside, and newspapers reported its movements. The dog was nicknamed the "Worrying Dog of Ennerdale".

Willy Jackson, a resident of Swinside, saw the Girt Dog 30 yards (27 m) away, urinating on a thistle, but his rifle shot missed. John Russell, who owned a brewery in Whitehaven and a sheep farm in Ennerdale, offered a £10 reward for the dog's capture, dead or alive. One morning in July 1810, 200 men and their hounds hunted Girt Dog over the Kinniside dells, but the day-long pursuit was unsuccessful. On another occasion, a hunting party passed by the Ennerdale church during a Sunday morning service, leading many male churchgoers, and possibly even the Reverend Mr Ponsonby, to abandon the congregation and join the hunt. Anthony Atkinson spotted the Girt Dog resting beside a grassy hedge; he struck it with three bullets but could not bring it down.

On 12 September 1810, the dog was finally shot and killed by John Steel, a resident of Asby. Its carcass weighed 8 imperial stones (51 kg).

== Aftermath ==
Following the dog's death, the mass sheep killings in the region stopped. Until the late 1800s, the animal's taxidermied skin was on display in the Hutton's Museum at Keswick, Cumbria; it was discarded at some point due to the corpse beginning to rot.
