= Ennerdale Bridge =

Hamlet in Cumbria, England

Coordinates: 54.530°N 3.438°W

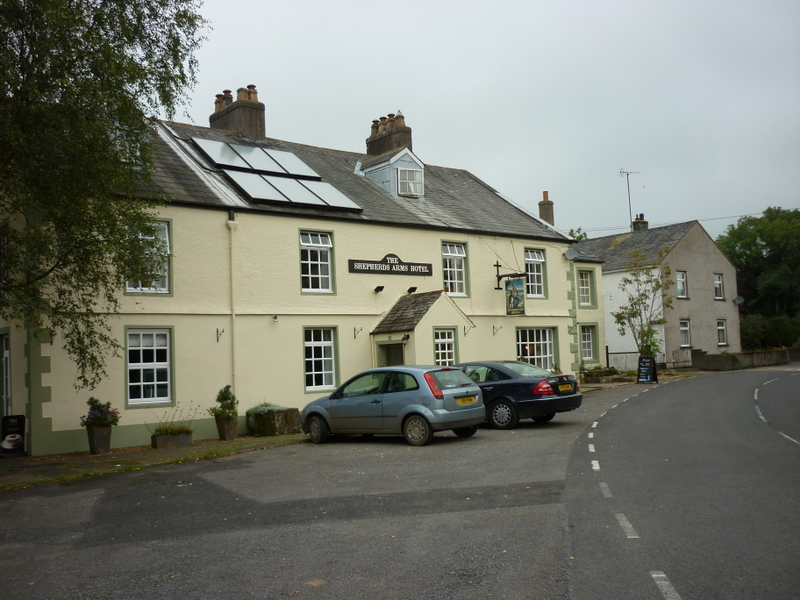
- The Shepherds Arms Hotel, Ennerdale Bridge

- Location in Copeland Borough Location within Cumbria
- Population: 220 (2011)
- OS grid reference: NY069159
- Civil parish: Ennerdale and Kinniside
- Unitary authority: Cumberland
- Ceremonial county: Cumbria
- Region: North West
- Country: England
- Sovereign state: United Kingdom
- Post town: CLEATOR
- Postcode district: CA23
- Dialling code: 01946
- Police: Cumbria
- Fire: Cumbria
- Ambulance: North West
- UK Parliament: Whitehaven and Workington

Ennerdale Bridge is a hamlet in the county of Cumbria, England. It is in the civil parish of Ennerdale and Kinniside. It had a total population taken at the 2011 census of 220.

== Description ==
Ennerdale Bridge lies at the confluence of Croasdale Beck and the River Ehen and is on the border of the Lake District National Park that uses both watercourses as its boundary. The nearest town is Cleator Moor to its west. Ennerdale Bridge appears in many versions of Alfred Wainwright's Coast to Coast Walk and is 13 miles (21 km) from its western end.

The parish church, dedicated to St Mary, is Victorian - dating from 1858 - in the Romanesque style.

== Toponymy ==
The name Ennerdale means 'Anund's valley', from 'Anundar', genitive of the Old Norse personal name 'Anundr'/'Qnundr', and 'dalr' 'valley', cross-influenced by 'Ehen', the name of the local river.

The village has a community-run café, The Gather, which is a popular stop-off for tourists walking the famed Coast to Coast walk.

== Governance ==
The civil parish falls in the electoral ward of Ennerdale. This ward stretches north to Lamplugh with a total population taken at the 2011 census of 1,025.

== See also ==
- Listed buildings in Ennerdale and Kinniside
- Ennerdale Water
