= Lake District High Fells =

Area protected for ecological interest

Coordinates: 54°40′34″N 003°4′51″W

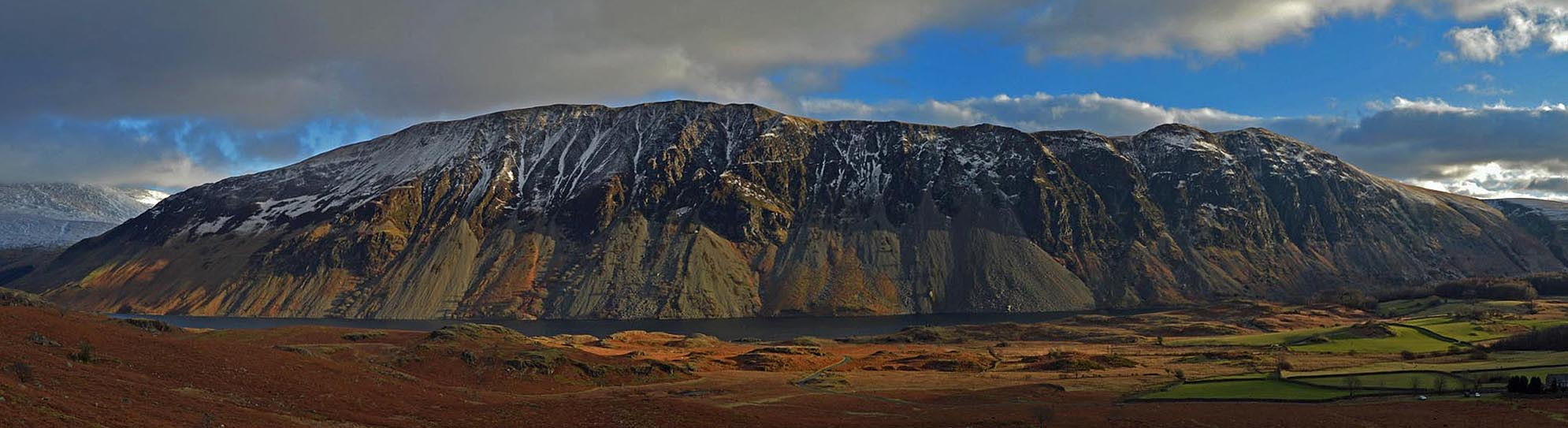
- Wasdale Screes, one of the fells included in the SAC
- Interactive map of Lake District High Fells
- Area: 27,003 ha (66,730 acres)

Lake District High Fells is a Special Area of Conservation (SAC) in Cumbria, England, which was designated in 2005. It is a multi-site SAC with an area of 27,003.07 ha (104.2594 sq mi) consisting of 10 separate sites including the summit of Scafell Pike, which at 977 m (3,205 ft) is the highest mountain in England. The SAC takes its name from the English Lake District and "Fell", the local word for a mountain. It protects 16 habitat types listed in the European Union's Habitats Directive.

As is usual with SACs in England, the protected areas are also covered by Site of Special Scientific Interest (SSSI) designations. The ten component sites are as follows:

- Armboth Fells SSSI
- Birk Fell SSSI
- Buttermere Fells SSSI
- Helvellyn & Fairfield SSSI
- Honister Crag SSSI
- Pillar & Ennerdale Fells SSSI
- Scafell Pikes SSSI
- Shap Fells SSSI
- Skiddaw Group SSSI
- Wasdale Screes SSSI (Wast Water is a separate SAC protecting the lake)

Additionally:

- River Derwent & Tributaries SSSI (overlaps the SAC)
- River Eden & Tributaries SSSI (overlaps the SAC)

== Management issues ==
Much of the land is used as pasture. At the time the SAC was designated, the view was expressed that sheep grazing had had by far the biggest man-made impact on the condition of almost all of the features in the SAC. In places a problem of "inappropriate grazing" has been identified.

Less than 1% of the SAC is woodland. The scarcity of trees is partly explained by the fact that some of the SAC lies above the tree line. In the Lake District the climatic tree line has been estimated to lie at about 535 m., but this would probably refer to isolated pioneers: the remnant woodlands are somewhat lower. However, there has clearly been major loss of tree cover. One of the SSSIs underpinning the SAC where there is semi-natural woodland is Pillar and Ennerdale Fells, which includes a wood rising above Ennerdale Water in an example of altitudinal succession. Ennerdale is also the home of a rewilding project.

The SAC is within the Lake District National Park which has a duty to conserve and enhance the natural beauty, wildlife and cultural heritage of the area. However, its SSSIs have given cause for concern, as regards their condition, and their monitoring (in 2018 it was revealed in answer to a parliamentary question that English Nature had failed to inspect a number of SSSIs, including Scafell Pike, within the required six-year timescale. Budget cuts were blamed).

Since the SAC was designated, the significance of the National Park as a cultural landscape has been endorsed by UNESCO, which gave World Heritage Site status to the Lake District in 2017. According to UNESCO, the "combined work of nature and human activity has produced a harmonious landscape". However, the sheep farming tradition is not without its critics. The environmentalist George Monbiot has described the High Fells as a "sheep museum".
