= Ennerdale black pearl =

Rare pearl

The Ennerdale black pearl is a rare black pearl formed in freshwater pearl mussels found on stretches of the Ehen and Irt rivers in the English county of Cumbria.

The pearls were probably known as far back as Roman times. Both Tacitus and Bede mention British pearls, and William Camden says of the Irt "In this brook the shell-fish, eagerly sucking in the dew, conceive and bring forth pearls, or (to use the Poet’s word) shell-berries. These the inhabitants gather up at low water and the jewellers buy them." In about 1695, a company was formed to search for pearls in the Irt, and Thomas Patrick of Ennerdale is said to have employed people to gather the pearls.

In recent times, freshwater mussel populations have been affected by several issues, including wildlife crime, habitat degradation and declining water quality. Between 2015 and 2018, the West Cumbria Rivers Trust carried out conservation work on the River Irt to try and protect the habitat and prevent the complete eradication of the freshwater mussel from the river.
