= Pillar and Ennerdale Fells =

Protected area in Cumbria, England

Coordinates: 54.496°N 3.339°W

Pillar and Ennerdale Fells is a Site of Special Scientific Interest (SSSI) in Ennerdale, Cumbria, England. Protected for its biological interest, the site is named after Pillar, which at 892 metres (2,927 ft) is the eighth-highest mountain in the Lake District, and other fells in the same range. The area is 425.25 ha.

== History ==
The site was notified in 1991. The site includes Side Wood on the south side of Ennerdale Water, which was formerly part of the adjacent Ennerdale SSSI.

== Ecology ==
Side Wood, which rises from Ennerdale Water, is a good example of an upland birch Betula pubescens – sessile oak Quercus petraea woodland. While there are higher woods in the Lake District, Side Wood is important as an example of altitudinal succession. The vegetation changes from "native upland birch-oak woodland at 120 m" on the shores of the lake, through "sub-montane heaths and grasslands to montane heaths along the summit ridge at an altitude of 890 m".

Above the woodland is gently sloping heathland dominated by heather, bell heather and bilberry; the associated grasses are sheep's-fescue, common bent, mat-grass, tormentil and heath bedstraw. Higher up, bilberry and grasses predominate, while on the summit ridge, where the snow lies late, mosses, sedges, lichens and viviparous fescue occur.

The crags of Pillar, away from grazing sheep, are home to a lush, herb-rich upland ledge community of plants. Breeding birds on Pillar and Ennerdale Fells include buzzard, peregrine falcon, merlin, raven, wheatear, whinchat, ring ouzel and red grouse.

Ennerdale is managed as a rewilding project called "Wild Ennerdale", which was established in 2003. The Wild Ennerdale Partnership gives scope for the management of this site holistically at the landscape scale.

== Other measures of protection ==
The SSSI is one of ten underpinning a Special Area of Conservation, Lake District High Fells, which was designated in 2005.

== Land ownership ==
Two major landowners own land within Pillar and Ennerdale Fells SSSI; National Trust and Forestry Commission. The section owned by Forestry Commission is east of Iron Crag.

== See also ==
- SSSIs in Cumbria
