= Skiddaw Group SSSI =

Protected area in Cumbria, England

- IUCN category IV (habitat/species management area) (Note: In the UK, SSSIs are mostly categorised under IUCN category IV, with the future potential to classify primarily geological SSSIs in category III. A few are in category I.)
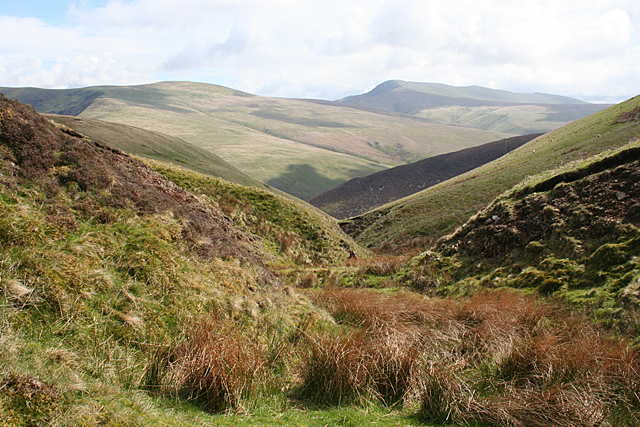
- Skiddaw from Brandy Gill

- Location within Cumbria
- Nearest town: Keswick, Cumbria
- Coordinates: 54.669°N 3.102°W
- Area: 10,256 ha (39.60 sq mi)
- Average elevation: 490 m (1,610 ft)
- Max. elevation: 930 m (3,050 ft)
- Min. elevation: 126 m (413 ft)
- Designation: SSSI

Relief map of Skiddaw Group SSSI including unit numbers

Skiddaw Group SSSI is a site of special scientific interest in the Lake District High Fells, England. Its shape is approximately an irregular circle centred near Great Calva, with an area of 10,256.3 hectares (39.600 sq mi). The high ground creates a watershed between the Caldew Operational Catchment with water flowing north towards Carlisle, and the Ellen and West Coast and Derwent Operational Catchments flowing towards the west coast at Workington and Maryport. The area includes the Skiddaw Forest nature reserve.

The SSSI is designated for its flora and fauna, and for its geology. The geology includes the Skiddaw Group of sedimentary rock formations, and the Caldbeck Fells former mining area. Fells above 2,000 feet (610 m) include High Pike, Carrock Fell, Knott, Great Calva, and Bowscale Fell. The highest peaks are in the Skiddaw area, including Skiddaw itself, Long Side, Carl Side, Little Man, Lonscale Fell and, further east, Blencathra.

The SSSI is divided into a patchwork of "units" which are used as the level of geographic detail for reporting overall features and conditions. Each unit is identified by the Ordnance Survey grid reference at the centre of the unit, its area in hectares, the date it was last surveyed, and the drainage catchment it is located in. (Note: Units are not catchment-based. The unit boundaries do not precisely follow catchment boundaries so the catchment name associated with the unit is indicative only.) For example Bassenthwaite Common, which is unit 27, is nearly 700 ha (2.7 sq mi) centred at NY252299 in the Dash beck catchment. The habitat is there is dwarf shrub heath which, when surveyed in November 2010, was in an "unfavourable – recovering" condition.

== Skiddaw Forest ==
Skiddaw Forest is the ancient name of an expanse of land to the east of Skiddaw summit, with the word "forest" referring here to a medieval pattern of land ownership. In 2024 the forest area within the Underskiddaw civil parish area, (Note: The SSSI boundary overlaps with its surrounding civil parishes. Clockwise from the north, these are: Caldbeck; Mungrisdale; Threlkeld; Underskiddaw; Bassenthwaite; and Ireby and Uldale. The Skiddaw Forest nature reserve lies within Underskiddaw.) essentially SSSI units 30 and 31 together with the summits of Skiddaw (unit 16) and Great Calva (unit 17), was purchased by Cumbria Wildlife Trust as a 1,200 ha (4.6 sq mi) nature reserve. The long term biodiversity and rewilding goals include encouraging tree growth to create tracts of temperate rainforest, and restoring peatlands.

Unit 30, Skiddaw Forest West, was assessed in 2021 as having "favourable" conditions for invertebrate and breeding bird features, but "unfavourable – recovering" blanket bog and upland dry heath habitats. Conditions in unit 31, Skiddaw Forest East were assessed as "favourable" in 2021.

== Caldbeck Fells mines ==
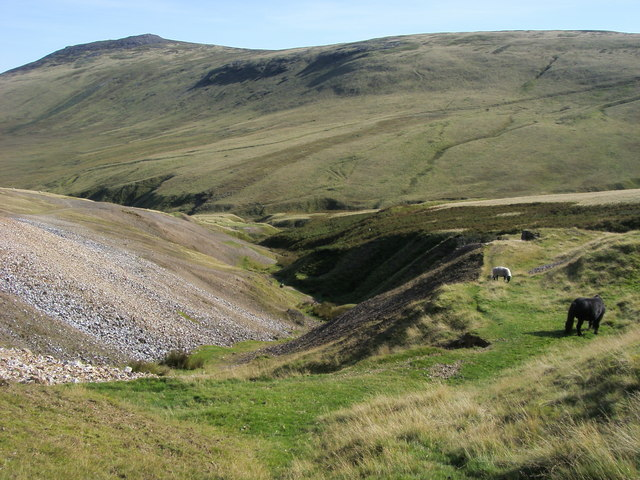
Disused mine workings on Caldbeck Fells

The northern part of the SSSI includes several sites of former mines, noted today for the presence of minerals in spoil heaps and erosion sites.

Spoil heaps at Red Gill Mine (NY295347, unit 26) include rare, crystallised lead sulphates, carbonates and phosphates. An adjacent mine at Roughtongill (NY302344, unit 23) reveals supergene minerals including copper and zinc varieties. English Heritage undertook a detailed survey of Roughtongill in 2001 and reported on its history and archaeology.

Dry Gill Lead Mine (NY324345, unit 24) has a unique form of mimetite, known as "campylite". Natural England surveyed the site in 2022 and found the exposed mineral veins had been damaged by collectors in the past but not recently. Burdell Gill (NY307324, unit 20) "is of national importance as the only relatively abundant source of the rare arsenic mineral, pharmacosiderite, in Britain". A vein at Wet Swine Gill (NY314321) includes stibnite and fuloppite but the 2022 survey (SSSI Unit 2) found that geological specimen collecting continued to cause damage. In the Carrock Mine – Brandy Gill spoil heaps (NY322338) the mineralisation is tungsten-rich. The Carrock Tungsten Mine (NY323329) and Carrock End Copper Mine are Scheduled Monuments.

There are other mine sites not mentioned in the SSSI designation, such as in the wider Grainsgill area (NY327327), near to Carrock mine. A 2021 survey in that area (SSSI unit 8) observed "Ordovician igneous geological features". Breafell lead mine (NY299357, unit 26) was downstream from Redgill and Roughtongill on the Dale Beck, a tributary of the Whelpo. Driggith lead mine was downstream from Drygill mine. Sandbeck lead and copper mine (NY332362, unit 24/25) was 1,800 metres (1.1 mi) north east of High Pike.

== Caldew operational catchment ==
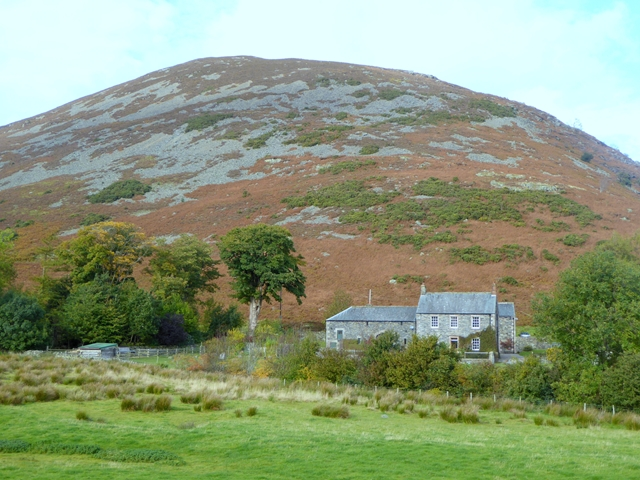
House at the foot of Carrock Fell

The Skiddaw Group SSSI includes the headwaters of the Whelpo (Cald) Beck and Caldew (upper) 'water bodies' (catchments). These are part of the Caldew operational catchment. (Note: Natural England groups catchments ('Water Bodies') into 'operational catchments'. Those are grouped into 'management catchments', which are grouped into 'river basin districts'.)

The Whelpo Beck catchment includes Brae Fell (586 m (1,923 ft), unit 26), and the former mine sites at Red Gill and Roughtongill (units 26 and 23). When surveyed by Natural England in 2010, both mine sites (SSSI Units 3 and 11) were showing some signs of collector activity and erosion but were not considered to be under threat. The "dwarf shrub heath" habitats were surveyed in 2022 (SSSI units 23 – Roughton Gill; 25 – Caldbeck North; and 26 – Brae Fell). They were all depleted by heavy grazing. Patches of bilberry (Vaccinium spp.) were observed on Brae Fell.

The Caldew (upper) catchment accounts for 40% of the total area of the SSSI and the majority of its assessment units. The River Caldew flows there between the Blencathra uplands in the south-east of the SSSI, and the Skiddaw and Caldbeck Fells uplands to the west and north. The catchment includes Great Calva (690 m (2,260 ft), unit 17) and Carrock Fell (661 m (2,169 ft), units 22 and 24). Around the edge of the catchment, Lonscale Fell, Skiddaw, Skiddaw Little Man, and Bowscale Fell form watersheds with the catchments in the Derwent Operational Catchment area. It includes the former mine sites at Dry Gill Mine, Carrock Mine-Brandy Gill, Burdell Gill and Wet Swine Gill. It also includes Bowscale Tarn (NY336313, unit 13), one of two glacial tarns in the SSSI, where quillwort (Isoetes lacustris), shoreweed (Littorella uniflora) and water lobelia (Lobelia dortmanna) have been found.

Heather moor predominates on sloping ground north and west of the River Caldew across several catchments. The east-facing slopes of Skiddaw, Little Man and Jenkin Hill exhibit degraded moss heath. Common juniper (Juniperus communis) scrub, which is a nationally rare habitat, is most extensive on the steep, rocky south-facing slopes of Carrock Fell (NY342336).

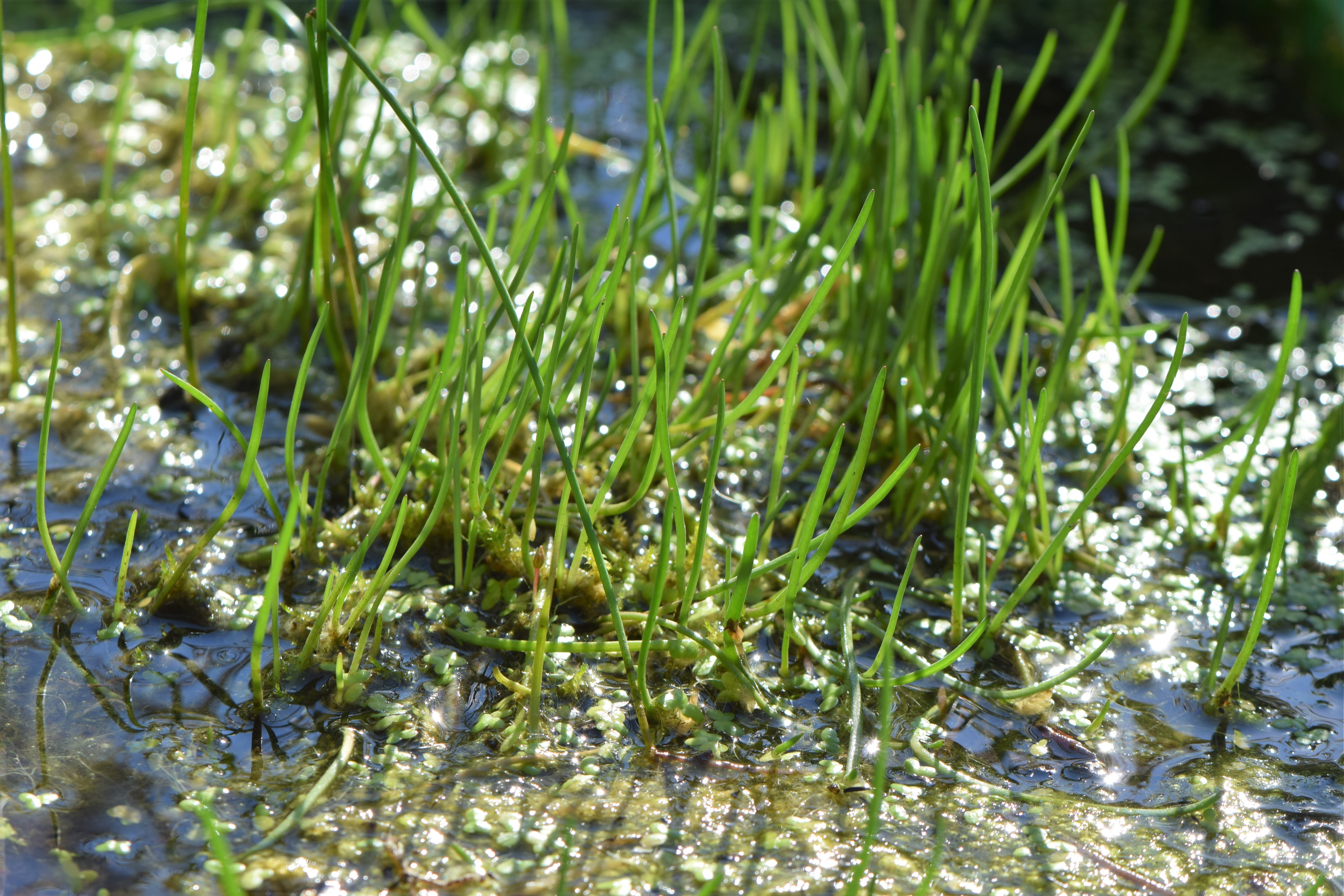
Shoreweed

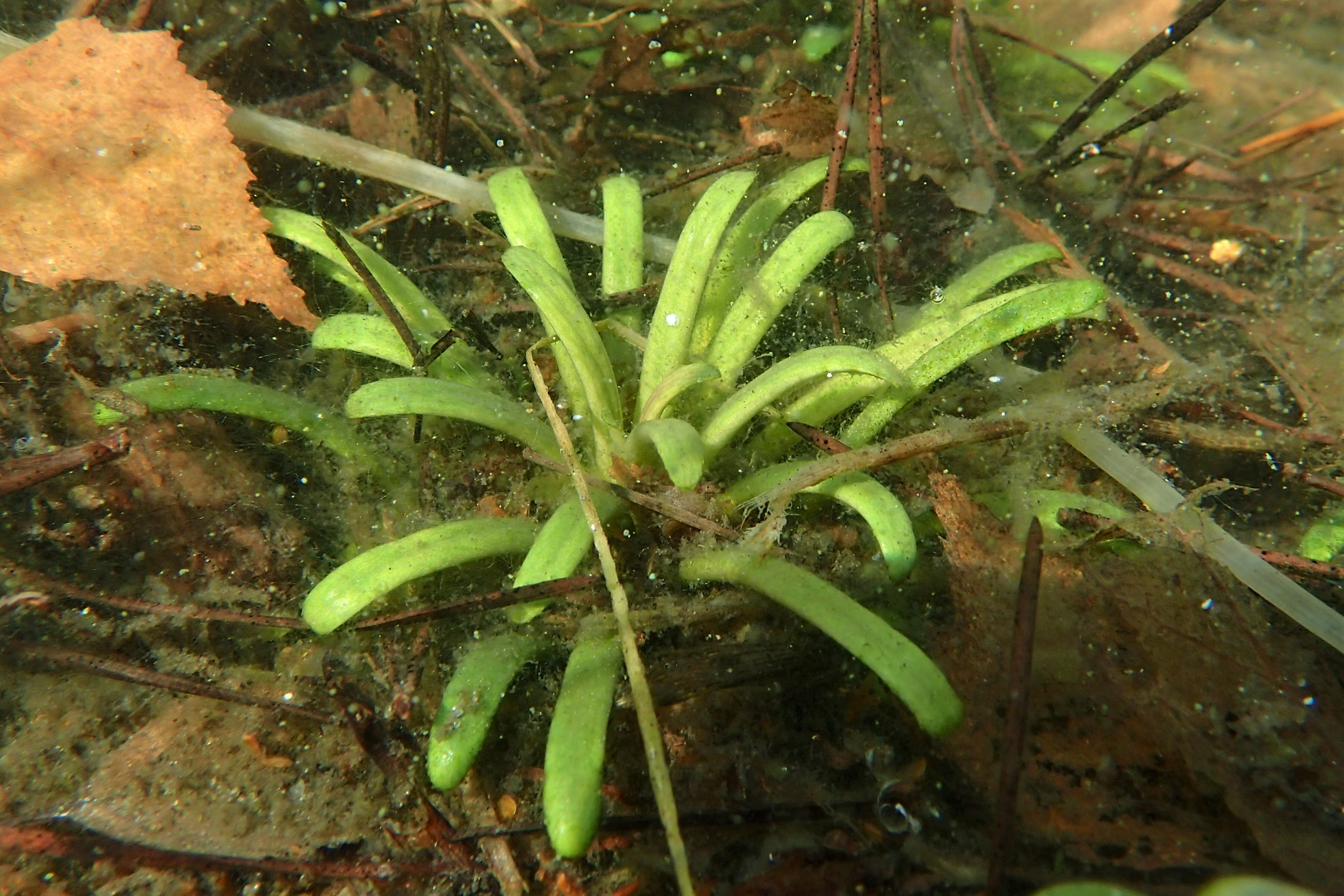
Water lobelia

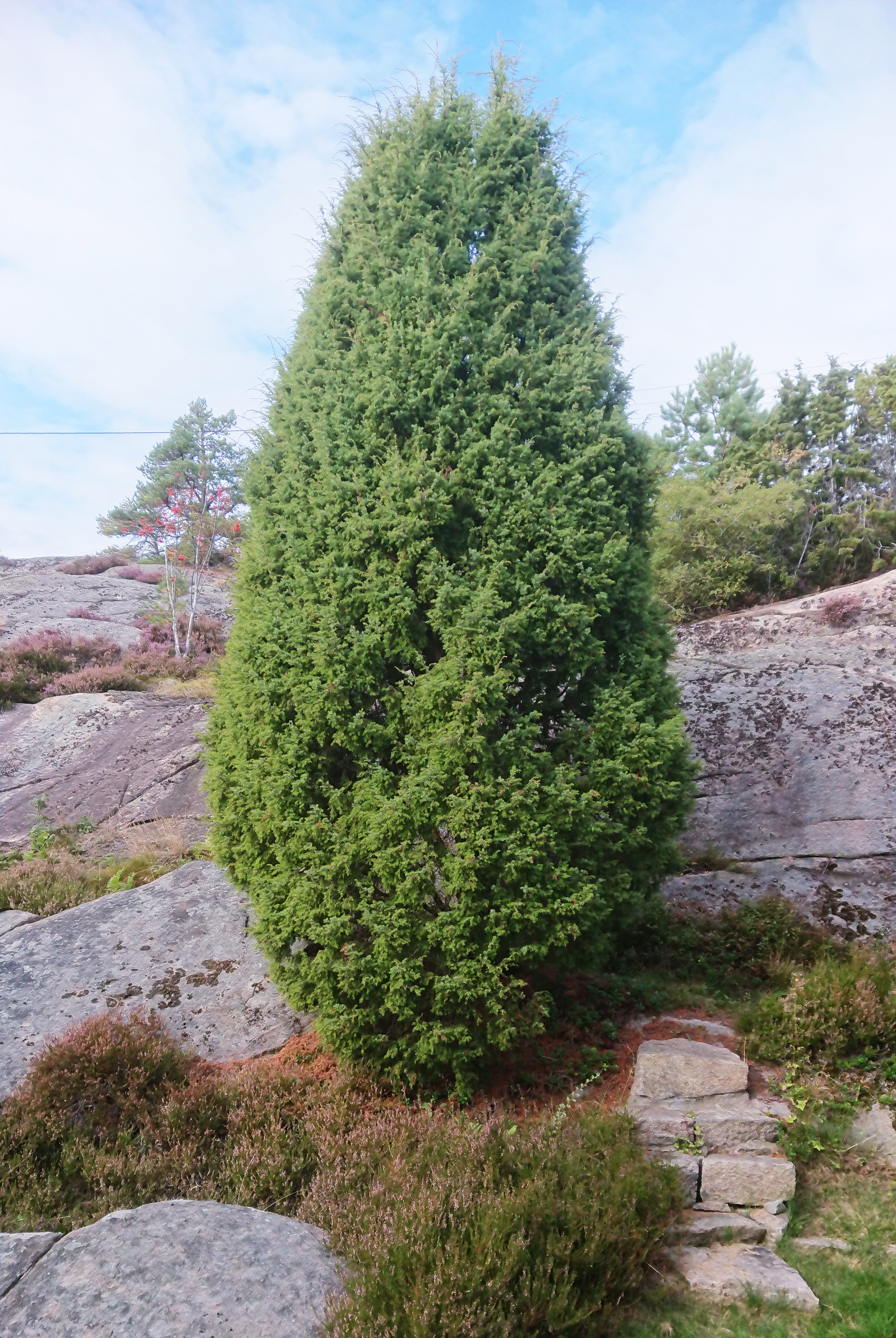
Common juniper

== Derwent management catchment ==
The Skiddaw Group SSSI includes headwaters of the Derwent management catchment, consisting of the Ellen (upper) catchment, which flows towards Maryport, and four catchments flowing towards Workington:

- Dash Beck
- Derwent US Bassenthwaite Lake and Derwent DS Bassenthwaite (Note: In these catchment names, US and u/s mean "upstream of"; DS is "downstream of")
- Glenderaterra Beck
- Glenderamackin u/s Troutbeck and Glenderamackin (Greta)

The Ellen (upper) catchment is at the north of the SSSI in the Uldale Fells. It is bounded by Longlands Fell, Lowthwaite Fell, Little and Great Sca Fells, Meal Fell and Great Cockup. Great Cockup (NY270334, unit 18) is known for fossils of dendroid graptolites. Tremadoc–Llanvirn geology is visible in the crags around Great Cockup. The heathland lacks species diversity and shows signs of heavy grazing. For catchment management purposes, the main water body is the Dale Gill which rises between Great and Little Cockup. The River Ellen's headwaters, with numerous small tributaries, drain the Uldale Fells and join Dale Gill beyond the SSSI boundary.

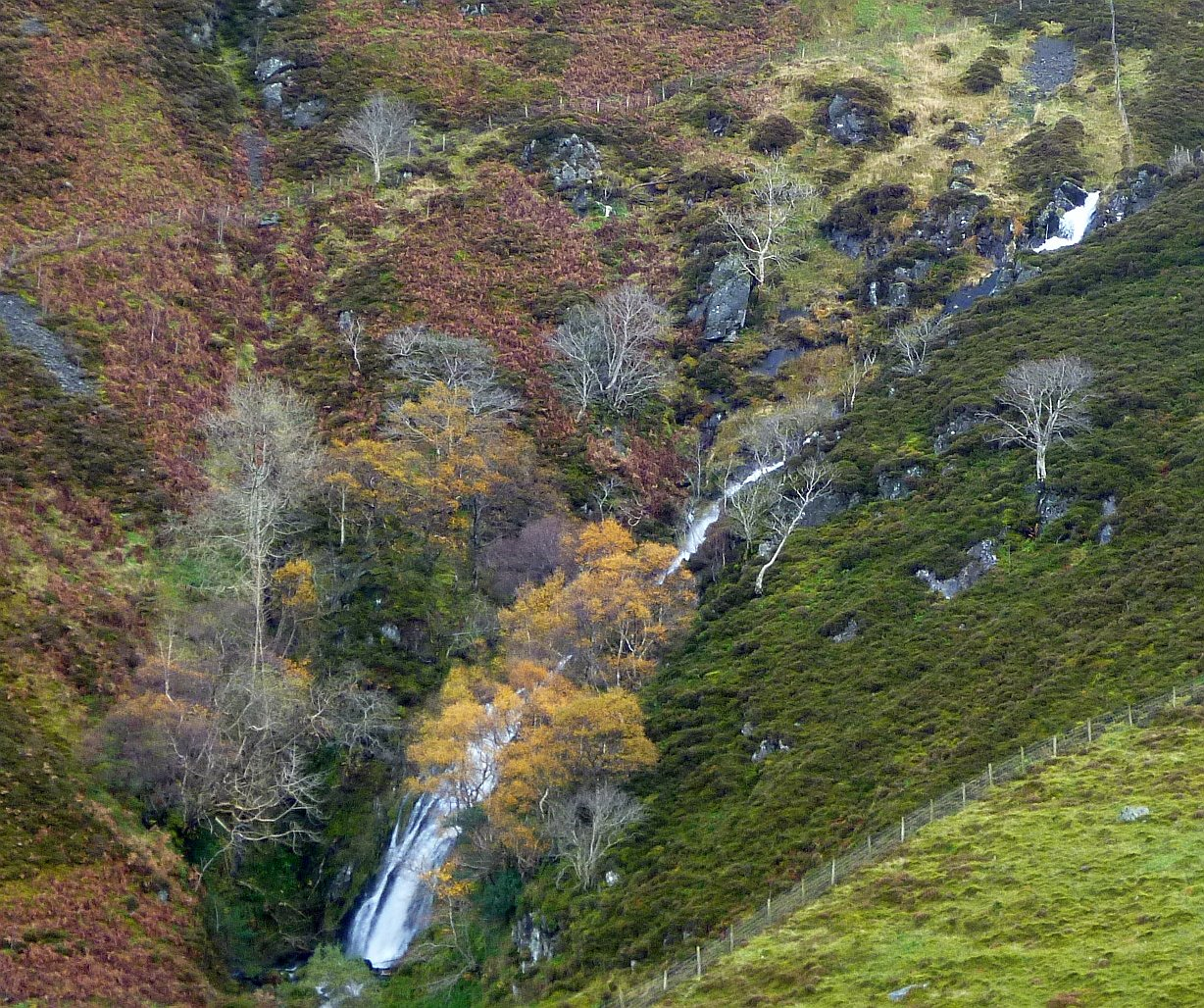
Whitewater Dash

The SSSI includes the headwaters of the Dash Beck catchment, including short lengths of Dash Beck itself, and of several of its tributaries. The part of the catchment within the SSSI stretches from Great Sca Fell in the north-east to Ullock Pike 7 km (4.3 miles) away in the south-west, with the Whitewater Dash waterfall (NY272313) where the beck crosses the catchment midway between the two. The area includes Bakestall where crowberry (Empetrum nigrum) is the dominant dwarf-shrub. It also includes Broad End which has "the best developed example [of montane moss-grass heath in West Cumbria] at about 700 m (2,300 ft)" elevation. There are two monitoring units in the Dash beck catchment: Uldale South (SSSI Unit 19, NY282322) has low species diversity with some areas recovering; Uldale North (SSSI Unit 18, NY272342) includes heather (Calluna vulgaris), bilberry (Vaccinium spp), crowberry (Empetrum nigrum) and cross-leaved heath (Erica tetralix) but the sites are fragmented where they should be continuous. In the north-east of the catchment, the watershed is marked by Knott, Great Sca Fell, Meal Fell, and Great Cockup.

The Glenderaterra Beck catchment includes Lonscale Fell (SSSI Unit 29, NY289269, surveyed 2024) and Blencathra North West (SSSI Unit 32, NY311274, surveyed 2019). Lonscale Fell ecology included some bracken and limited cover of ericoid shrubs in its "acidic grassland with bilberry" habitats. Blencathra North West had "blanket bog with abundant hare's-tail cottongrass (Eriophorum vaginatum) and deergrass (Trichophorum cespitosum) over locally abundant bog mosses".

There is a small area of common juniper (Juniperus communis) scrub in Glenderamackin u/s Troutbeck on The Tongue (NY347302). The same catchment includes Scales Tarn (Blencathra), one of the two glacial tarns in the SSSI. The tarn has "low nutrient levels and [is] inherently species-poor". The area around the tarn has in the past been subject to heavy grazing. Mungrisdale East (SSSI Unit 35, NY343297) includes hare's-tail cottongrass (Eriophorum vaginatum), abundant sphagnum moss (Sphagnum spp.) and a good population of serrated wintergreen (Orthilia secunda). Young Wood (SSSI Unit 38, NY350307) is protected by fencing to keep grazing animals away and the oak woodland is recovering.

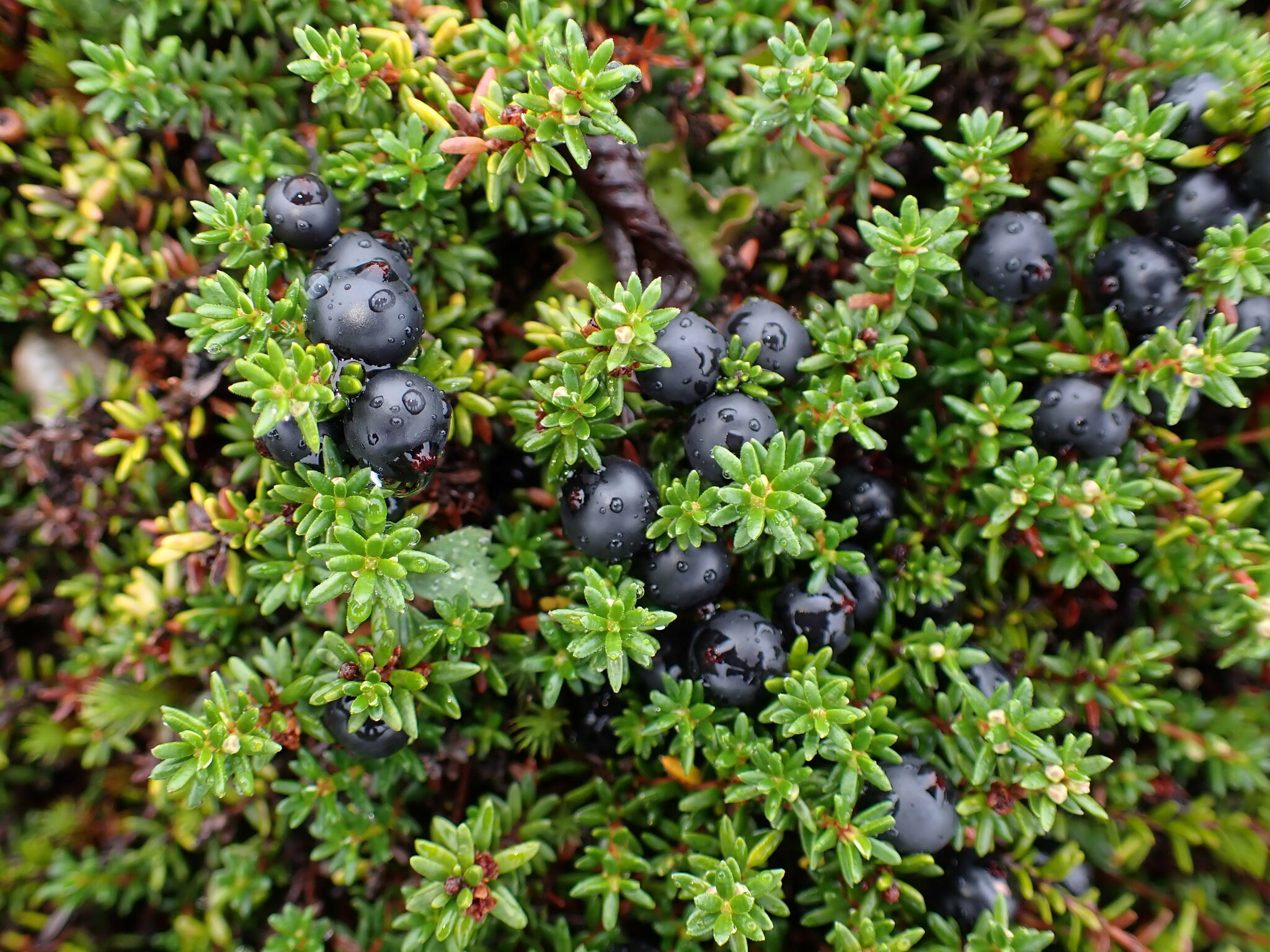
Crowberry

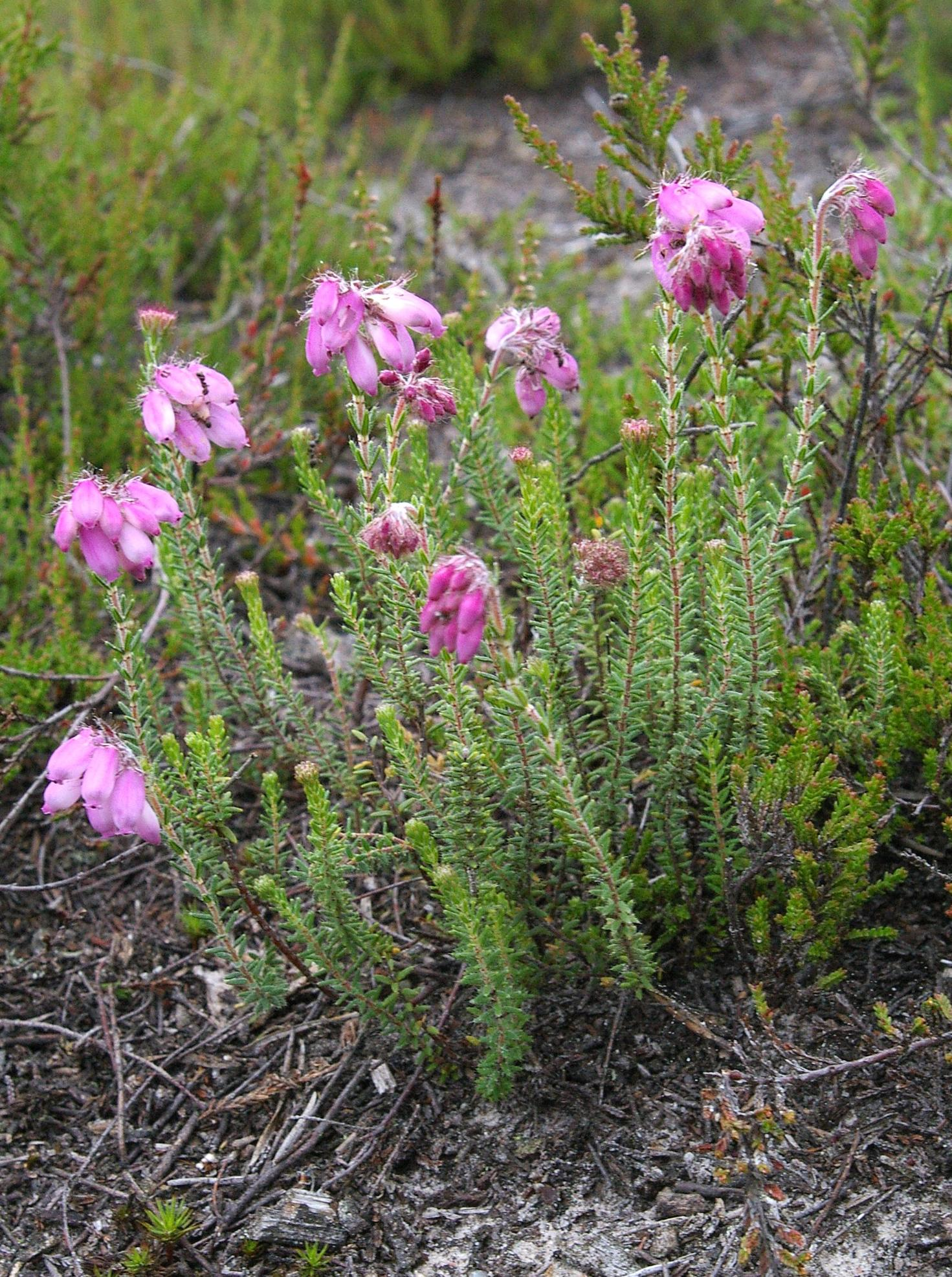
Cross-leaved heath

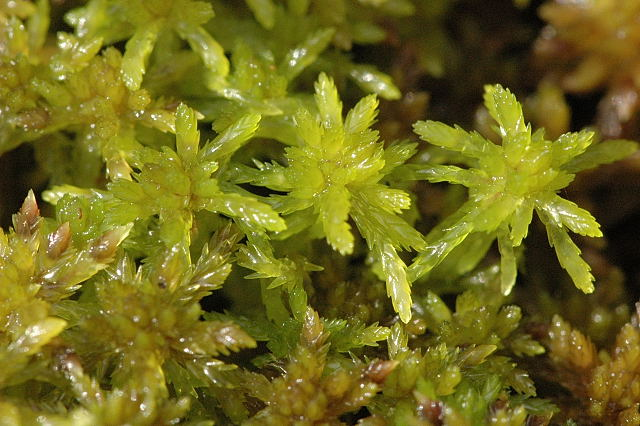
Sphagnum moss

== Related activities ==
=== Special Area of Conservation ===
Skiddaw Group SSSI is a component of the Lake District High Fells, a Special Area of Conservation. The SAC covers ten SSSIs but, within the Skiddaw Group, the SAC documentation identifies a range of habitats:

- 4010 Northern Atlantic wet heaths with cross-leaved heath (Erica tetralix)
- 4030 European dry heaths
- 4060 Alpine and Boreal heaths
- 5130 Common juniper (Juniperus communis) formations on heaths or calcareous grasslands
- 7130 Blanket bogs
- 8110 Siliceous scree of the montane to snow levels (alpine rock-jasmine (Androsace alpina) and red hemp-nettle (Galeopsis ladanum))

=== Cumbria Local Nature Recovery Strategy ===
Local Nature Recovery Strategies (LNRS) are a UK government response to declining biodiversity. The local strategies are established to agree priorities and propose actions to reverse the decline. The Cumbria Local Nature Recovery Strategy was developed following initial "Vision and Priority" workshops held in March 2024, with further consultation during 2025. The strategy includes the development of an interactive habitat map. The map shows where habitats need enhancing or, in worse cases, restoring. For example SSSI Unit 22 "Carrock Fell" includes an area of "moorland, heathland and montaine" habitat which would benefit from enhancement. However the south west edge of the unit is in worse condition so would need restoration.

=== United Kingdom Biodiversity Action Plan ===
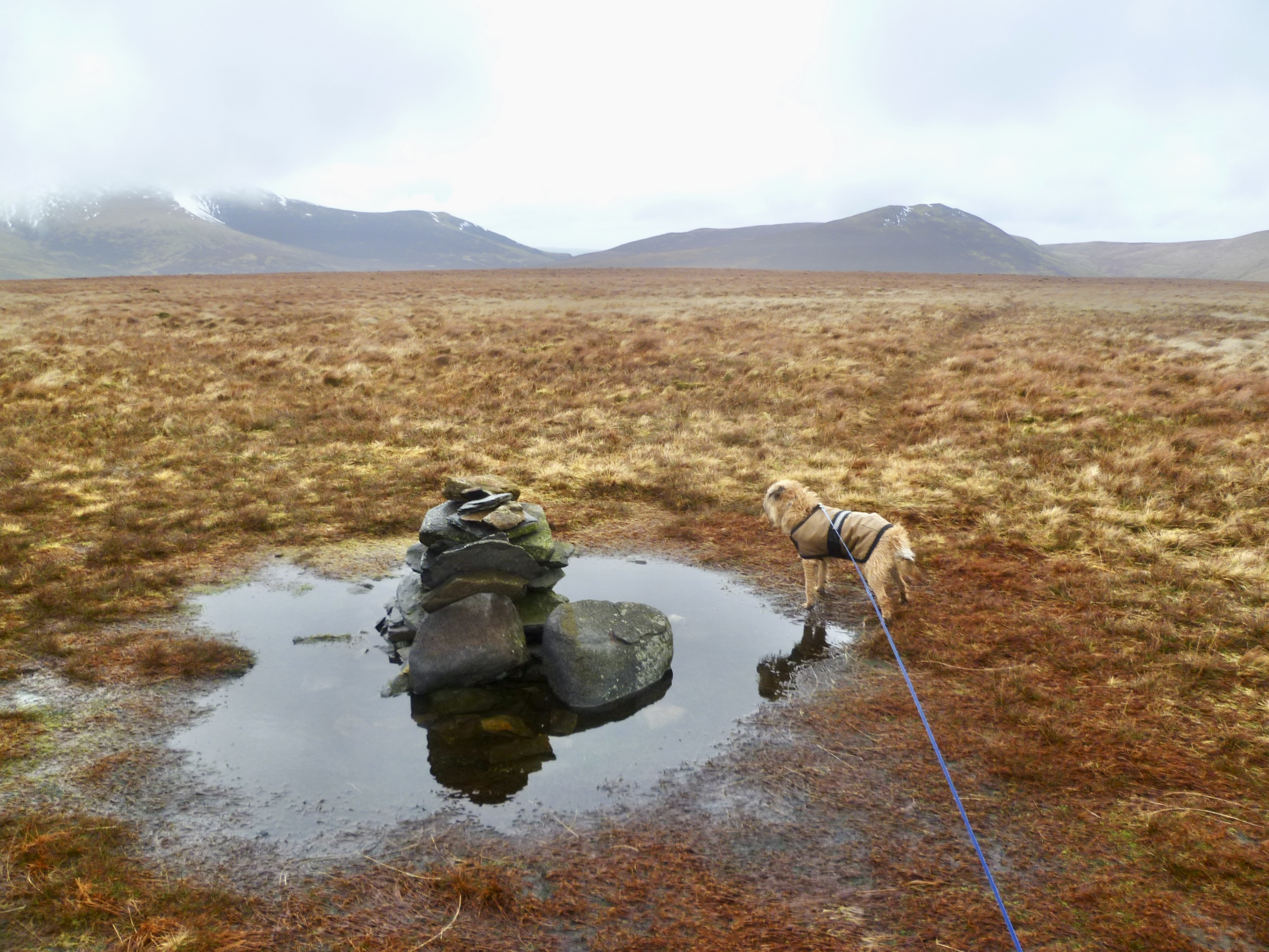
Blanket bog on Mungrisdale Common

The United Kingdom Biodiversity Action Plan identified a range of priority habitats which occur across the UK. The Skiddaw Group SSSI has large areas of grass moorland and upland heath, together with more fragmented areas of blanket bog. For example, the upland areas around Bannerdale Beck (SSSI Unit 35) contain 69 hectares (0.27 sq mi) of blanket bog, split across several smaller sites. More detailed mapping from DEFRA and the UK government open data resource shows the same areas of blanket bog but additionally shows areas where the habitat could be restored, where it could potentially be created, and where smaller areas could be used to re-join existing fragmented ones. (Note: The full Habitat Network classification is: Primary Habitat; Associated Habitats; Habitat Restoration-Creation; Restorable Habitat; Fragmentation Action Zone; Network Enhancement Zone 1; Network Enhancement Zone 2; Network Expansion Zone)

=== Geological Conservation Review (GCR) sites ===
The Geological Conservation Review is produced by the UK's Joint Nature Conservation Committee. Their site list includes twelve locations within the SSSI.

GCR sites within Skiddaw Group SSSI
SSSI Unit	Site name	Site code	GCR block	OS grid ref
22/24	Carrock Fell	295	Ordovician Igneous Rocks	NY352327
20	Burdell Gill	1134	Mineralogy of the Lake District	NY307325
24	Dry Gill Mine	1137	Mineralogy of the Lake District	NY323346
21	Carrock Mine – Brandy Gill	1138	Mineralogy of the Lake District	NY323335
26	Red Gill Mine	1139	Mineralogy of the Lake District	NY294348
23	Roughtongill	1140	Mineralogy of the Lake District	NY304344
20	Wet Swine Gill	1145	Mineralogy of the Lake District	NY314322
21	Grainsgill, Caldew Valley	1409	Caledonian igneous	NY327328
18	Great Cockup	2201	Arenig - Tremadoc	NY277336
35	Raven Crags, Mungrisdale	2254	Caledonian Structures of the Lake District	NY362307
21/37	River Caldew Section	2255	Caledonian Structures of the Lake District	NY326325
27	Skiddaw	2515	Quaternary of Cumbria	NY261287
