= Ennerdale and Kinniside =

Civil parish in Cumbria, England

Coordinates: 54.506°N 3.413°W

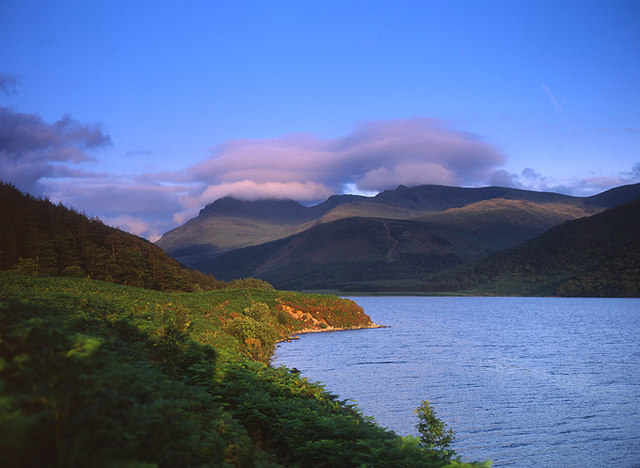
Ennerdale Water

Ennerdale and Kinniside is a civil parish in the Cumberland district of Cumbria, England. At the 2011 census it had a population of 220.

The parish has an area of 8,763 hectares (33.83 sq mi).

The village of Ennerdale Bridge is in the west of the parish; much of the parish forms Ennerdale valley, holding Ennerdale Water, the most westerly of the lakes of the Lake District.

The Anglican parish church of St Mary, Ennerdale is in Ennerdale Bridge village.

Ennerdale and Kinniside C of E Primary School is in Ennerdale Bridge village.

There is a parish council, the lowest tier of local government.

== Listed buildings ==
As of 2017 there are four listed buildings in the parish, all at grade II.

== Notable people ==
- Jessica Edgar (born 2005), racing driver
