= Whelpo =

Coordinates: 54°44′49″N 3°04′33″W

- Hamlet
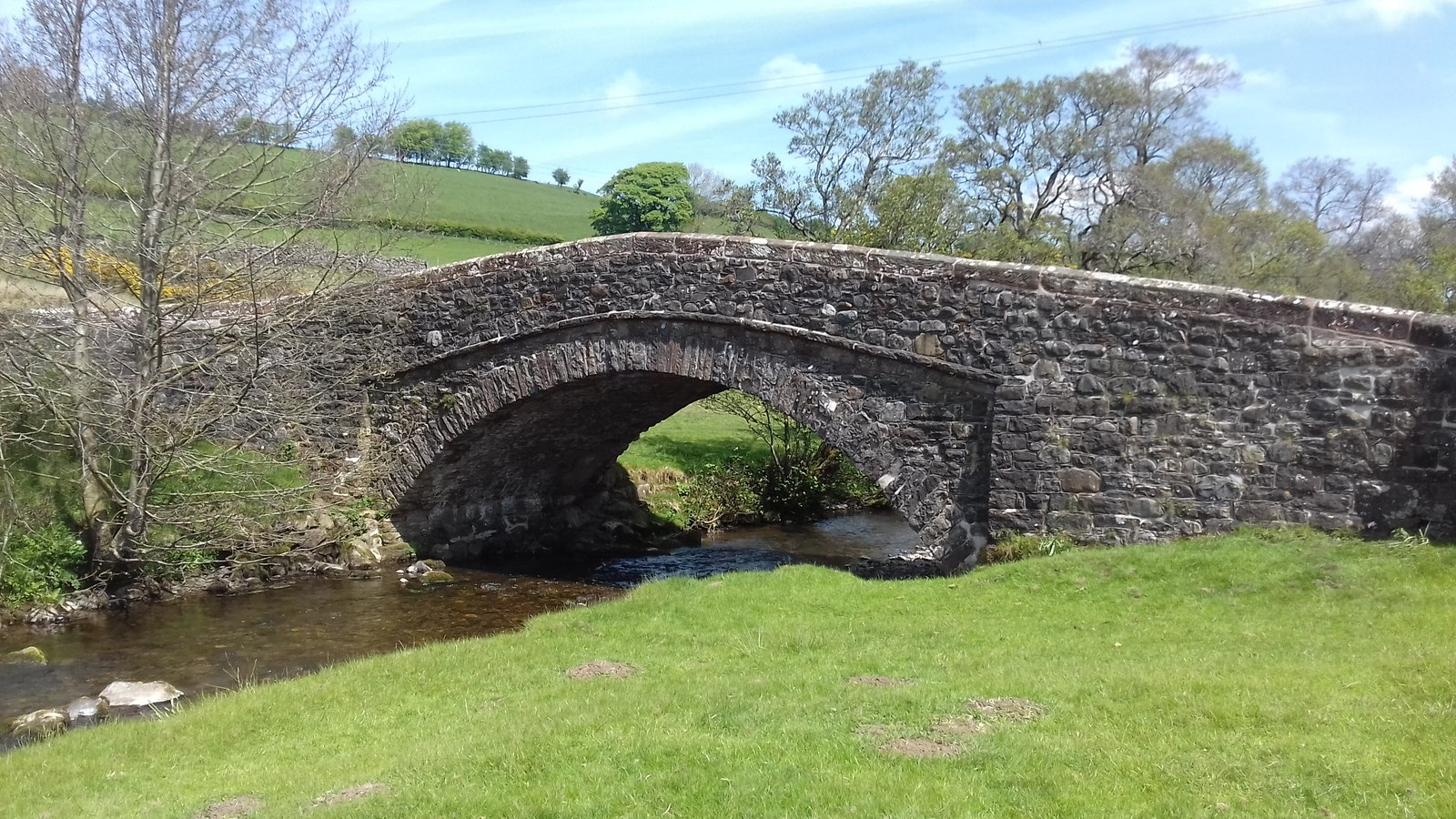
- Whelpo Bridge

- Location within Cumbria
- Civil parish: Caldbeck
- Unitary authority: Cumberland
- Ceremonial county: Cumbria
- Region: North West
- Country: England
- Sovereign state: United Kingdom
- Post town: WIGTON
- Dialling code: 016974
- Police: Cumbria
- Fire: Cumbria
- Ambulance: North West

Whelpo is a hamlet in the civil parish of Caldbeck, in the Cumberland unitary authority area, in the ceremonial county of Cumbria, England. It is about one mile west of the village of Caldbeck. It can be accessed by the B5299 road. The name "Whelpo" means "hill of the whelps", coming from Old Norse hvelpr. The hamlet contains two listed buildings – Whelpo Head, an 18th-century former farmhouse, and Whelpo Bridge, a stone bridge traversing Whelpo Beck.

The other feature in the hamlet is the aforementioned Whelpo Beck, also referred to as Cald Beck, which is a tributary to the River Caldew. The beck has a catchment area of 39.6 km^{2} (15.3 sq mi). The beck's headwaters are in the Caldbeck Fells and Uldale Fells in the vicinity of Longlands Fell, Lowthwaite Fell and Brae Fell in the Skiddaw Group SSSI. Longlands and Lowthwaite mark the watershed with the River Ellen which flows west to Maryport, whereas the Whelpo Beck eventually becomes the Caldew, joining the River Eden in Carlisle.
