= Birk Fell Hawse Mine =

Protected area in Cumbria, England

- Site of Special Scientific Interest
- Location within Cumbria
- Location of Birk Fell Hawse Mine.
- Area of search: Cumbria
- Grid reference: NY292015
- Coordinates: 54.404015°N 3.0921831°W
- Area: 2 acres (0.0081 km^{2}; 0.0031 sq mi)
- Notification date: 1997

Birk Fell Hawse Mine is a Site of Special Scientific Interest (SSSI) within the Lake District National Park in Cumbria, England. It is located on the Tilberthwaite Fells, near Wetherlam mountain, close to Little Langdale. This protected area has been designated because of the geology of the area.

== Details ==
A copper vein from the Devonian period is found in this protected area. This site gives an exceptional example of mineralisation of a copper vein. The minerals chalcopyrite and bornite are found within this protected area.

== Land ownership ==
All of the land within Birk Fell Hawse Mine SSSI is owned by the National Trust.
