= Honister Crag =

Fell in the English Lake District

Coordinates: 54°30′58″N 3°13′02″W

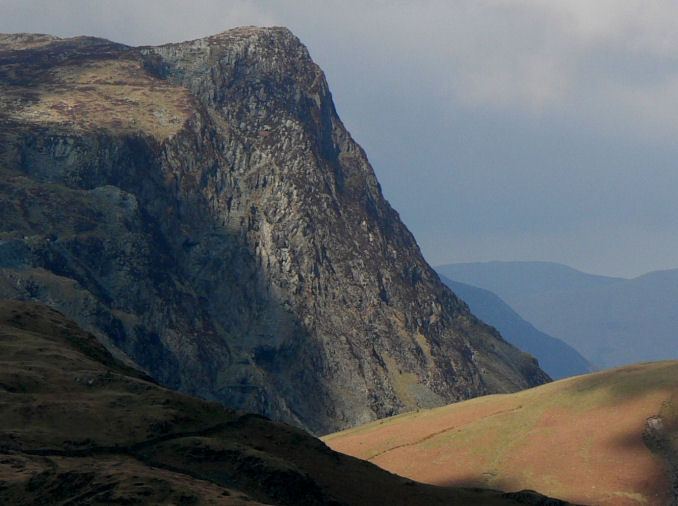
Honister Crag on the eastern side of Fleetwith Pike seen from Combe Gill

Honister Crag is a fell in the English Lake District. It has a height of 634 metres. It is adjacent to Fleetwith Pike, a higher summit, but it can claim to be a fell in its own right, as it is a Nuttall – one of the hills in England and Wales that are at least 2,000 feet (610 metres) high with a relative height of at least 15 metres (49.2 feet).

Honister Crag is of interest to rock-climbers.

== In Art and Literature ==
Letitia Elizabeth Landon's poetical illustration "Honister Crag, Cumberland", to an engraving of a painting by Thomas Allom, relates to a border skirmish between the Graemes and the Elliotts in the valley beneath.

== Protected area ==
A Site of Special Scientific Interest has been designated to protect the plant life and features of geological interest. Honister Crag SSSI also covers part of Fleetwith Pike.
