= River Liza =

River in Cumbria, England

Coordinates: 54°30′N 3°21′W

The River Liza flows through Ennerdale, a glacial valley in Cumbria, England. The river is allowed to flow freely as part of a rewilding project.

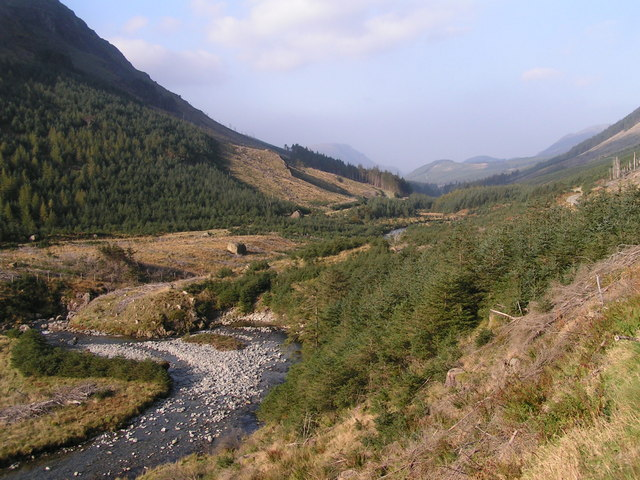
River Liza in Ennerdale

The Liza flows from its source below Windy Gap on Great Gable through a steep-sided valley to Ennerdale Water. The river's catchment is in the Lake District National Park.

== Etymology ==
The name of the Liza derives from the Old Norse ljós á, conferring a meaning of "light (or shining) river".

== Rewilding ==
The river is subject to the Wild Ennerdale Project which aims to introduce more wildlife to the Ennerdale Valley. The Wild Ennerdale Project uses a policy similar to managed retreat which means the river is subject to no human interference or maintenance such as dredging, straightening or even flood defences. This means the river is free to flood as the effects would be felt by very few people as the Ennerdale Valley is sparsely inhabited.

The river is used as a spawning ground by Arctic char and the project has increased their numbers.
