= Fleetwith Pike =

Mountain in the Lake District, England

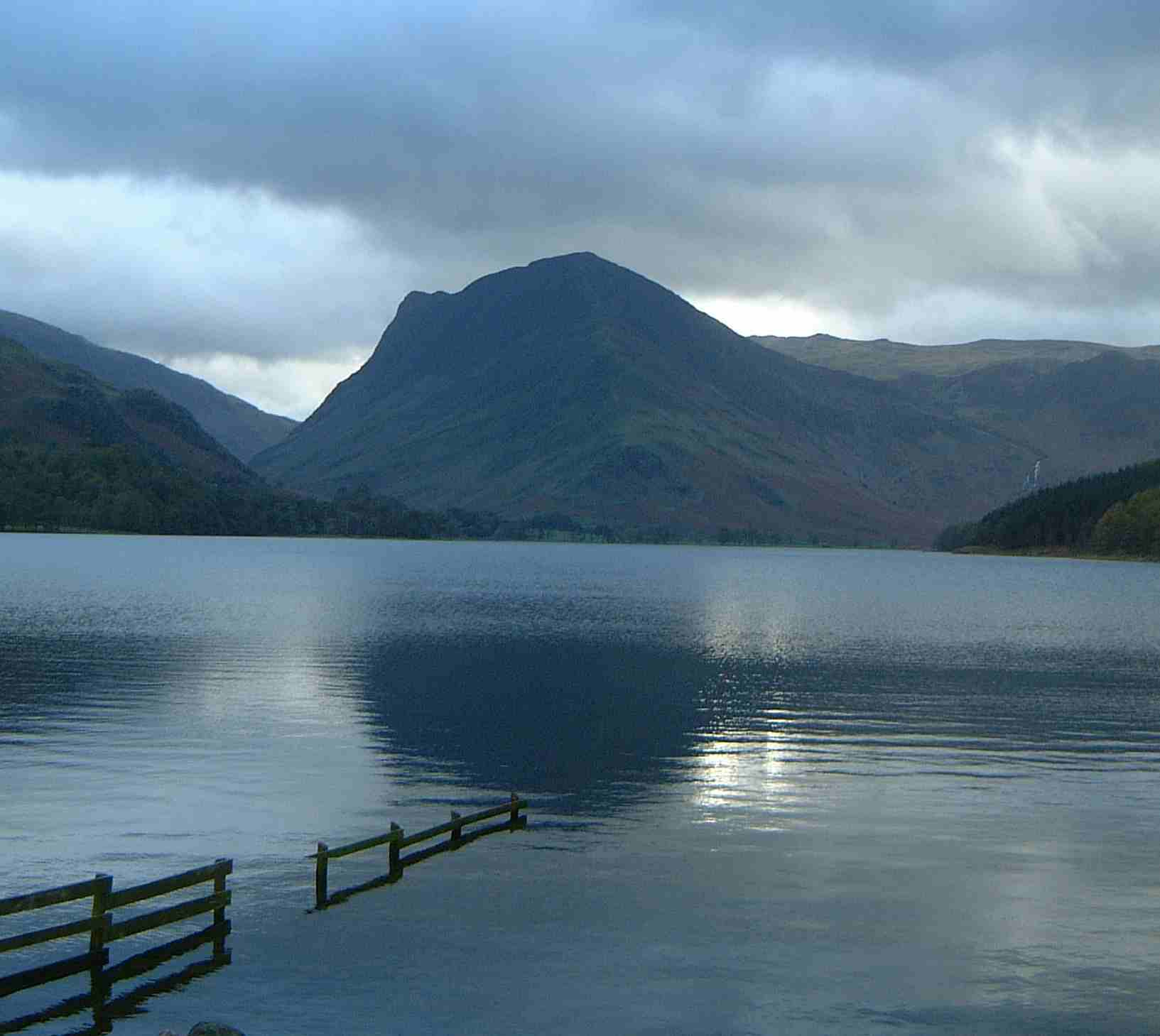
- Fleetwith Pike seen from the end of Buttermere

Highest point
- Elevation: 648 m (2,126 ft)
- Prominence: 117 m (384 ft)
- Parent peak: Great Gable
- Listing: Hewitt, Nuttall, Wainwright
- Coordinates: 54°30′57″N 3°13′46″W

Geography
- Location within the Lake District Location within the former Allerdale Borough
- Location: Cumbria, England
- Parent range: Lake District, Western Fells
- OS grid: NY205141
- Topo map: OS Landrangers 89, 90, Explorer OL4

Listed summits of Fleetwith Pike
| Name | Grid ref | Height | Status |
|---|---|---|---|
| Honister Crag | NY212142 | 630 m (2,070 ft) | Nuttall |

Fleetwith Pike is a fell in the English Lake District in the county of Cumbria which reaches a height of 648 metres (2,126 feet). The fell is a well-known feature of the area as it casts an imposing presence over Buttermere and the Honister Pass on the B5289 motor road between Borrowdale and Buttermere.

== Topography ==
Fleetwith Pike is the north-western shoulder of Grey Knotts. It is bounded by Honister Pass to the north and Warnscale Bottom to the south-west, their two streams uniting beneath the fell in Buttermere. The north west ridge rising almost from the lakeshore at Gatesgarth is named Fleetwith Edge, and is a striking feature from any direction. The top of the fell is situated directly at the top of the edge, while a lower summit stands to the east atop Honister Crag. Fleetwith Pike is lined on all sides by impressive crags, other than for the broad plateau leading across the Drum House to Grey Knotts.

== Slate extraction ==
The side of the fell which overlooks Honister Pass is actually known as Honister Crag and this has been commercially quarried for its high-quality green slate since the 1750s. Slate mining and quarrying at Honister did cease in 1986, but restarted in February 1997.

== Ascents ==
The fell itself is often climbed in conjunction with other neighbouring fells such as Haystacks and Grey Knotts; strong walkers may also take in the peaks of Great Gable and Green Gable. There are two possible starting points for the ascent of Fleetwith Pike: these are Gatesgarth in the Buttermere valley and the top of the Honister pass. Both places have car parks. The start from Honister Hause has the advantage of starting from a height of 356 metres (1,168 feet) and takes the walker through the quarry workings of the Honister Slate Mine and over Black Star, the highest point of Honister Crag at 630 metres (2,070 feet). Honister Crag was upgraded to become a Nuttall fell in November 2004, the first addition to the list since they were first published in 1990, it has 20 metres (66 feet) of topographical prominence from Fleetwith Pike. After crossing Honister Crag it is a simple walk to attain the top of Fleetwith Pike. The ascent from Gatesgarth goes up the intimidating-looking Fleetwith Edge; however, all the crags can be by-passed without too much difficulty. This route goes past a white cross which is clearly visible from the valley and bears the inscription "Erected by Friends of Fanny Mercer, accidentally killed 1887".

== Summit ==
The summit cairn is a few yards in from the top of the Edge, resting among pleasant grass and heather. The view from the summit gives a fine prospect of the Buttermere valley which also takes in the other two lakes of Crummock Water and Loweswater. The fells of Pillar and Great Gable are close by and are well seen.

== See also ==
- List of hills in the Lake District

== Gallery ==
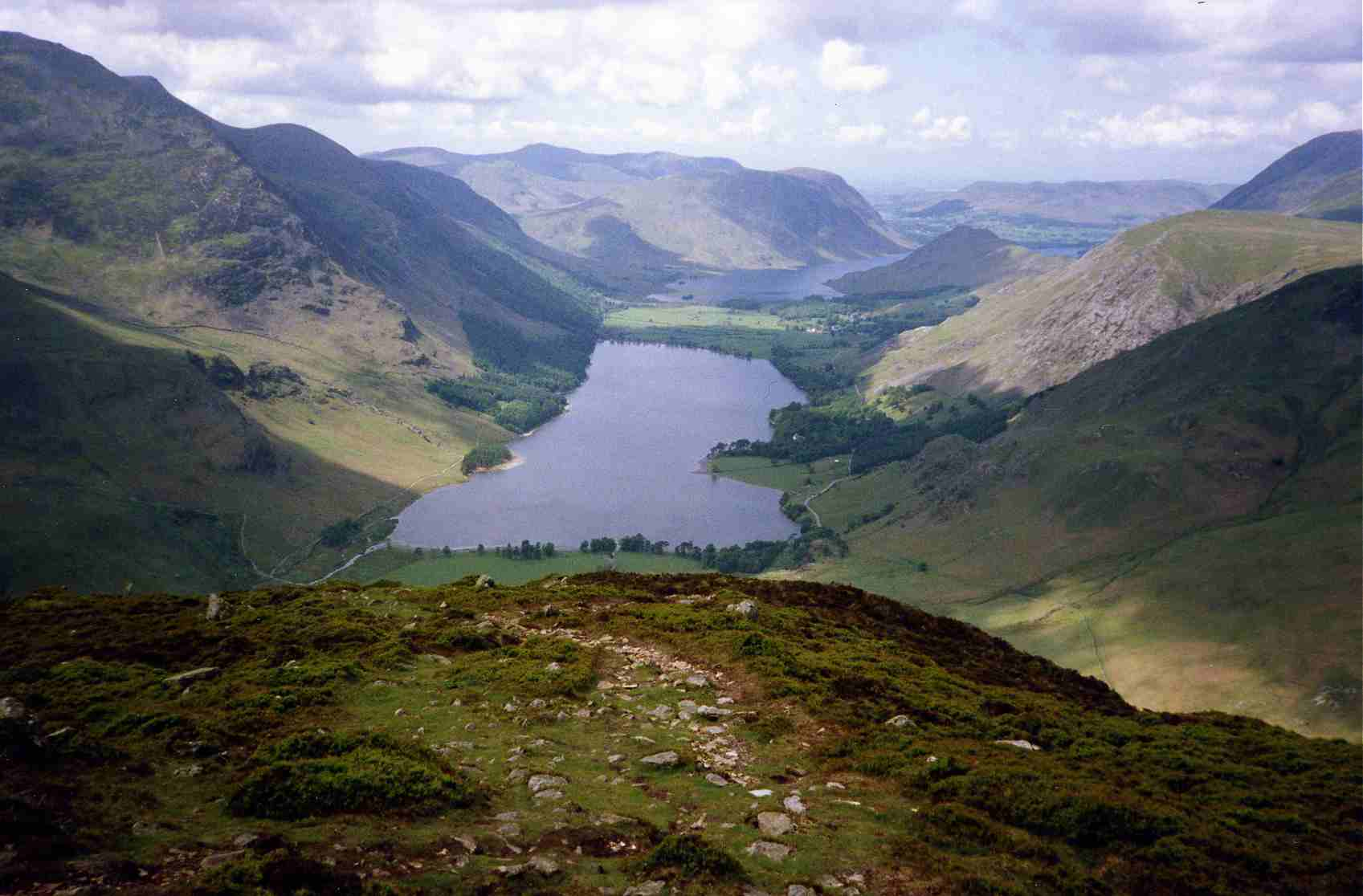
Buttermere seen from the summit of Fleetwith Pike

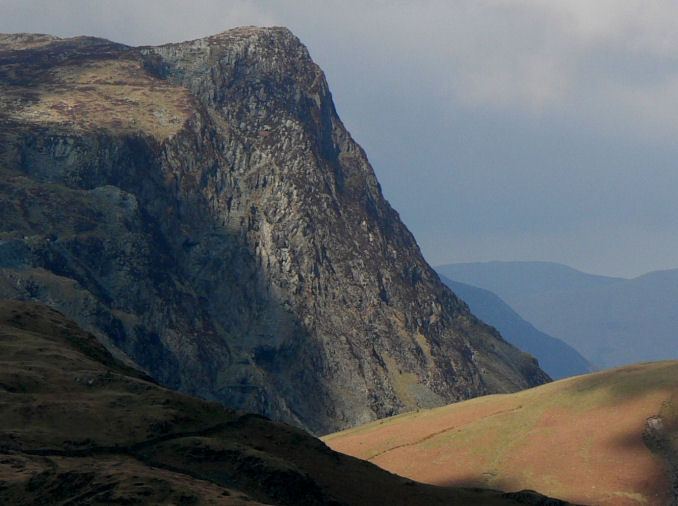
Honister Crag on the eastern side of Fleetwith Pike seen from Combe Gill

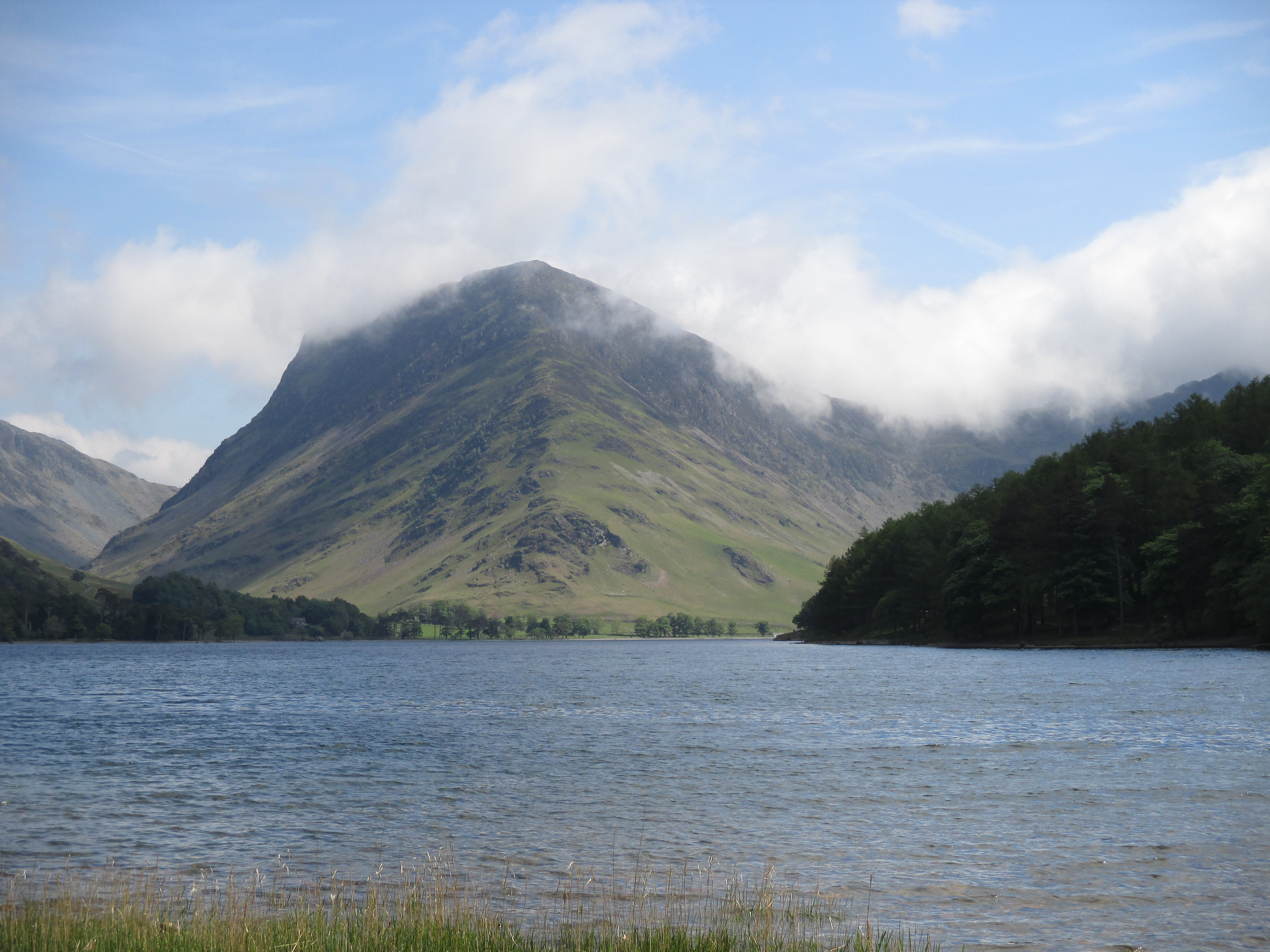
Fleetwith Pike under cloud
