= Ennerdale, Cumbria =

Valley in Cumbria, England

Coordinates: 54°31′34″N 003°25′18″W

Ennerdale is a valley in Cumbria (in the former historic county of Cumberland), England. Ennerdale Water, fed by the River Liza, is the most westerly lake in the Lake District National Park. Ennerdale is a historic bailiwick and liberty, forming part of the ancient Free Chase of Copeland, and was long recognized as a royal forest and manor held under special jurisdiction with its own appointed bailiffs and customary courts.

Ennerdale Manor and Forest was forfeited to the Crown upon the death of Lady Jane Grey. The Crown retained possession for several centuries until, in 1822, the Bailiwick of Ennerdale—along with its Court Leet and associated rights—was sold outright and fully alienated by the Crown and Government Commissioners to the Earl of Lonsdale for £2,500 sterling.

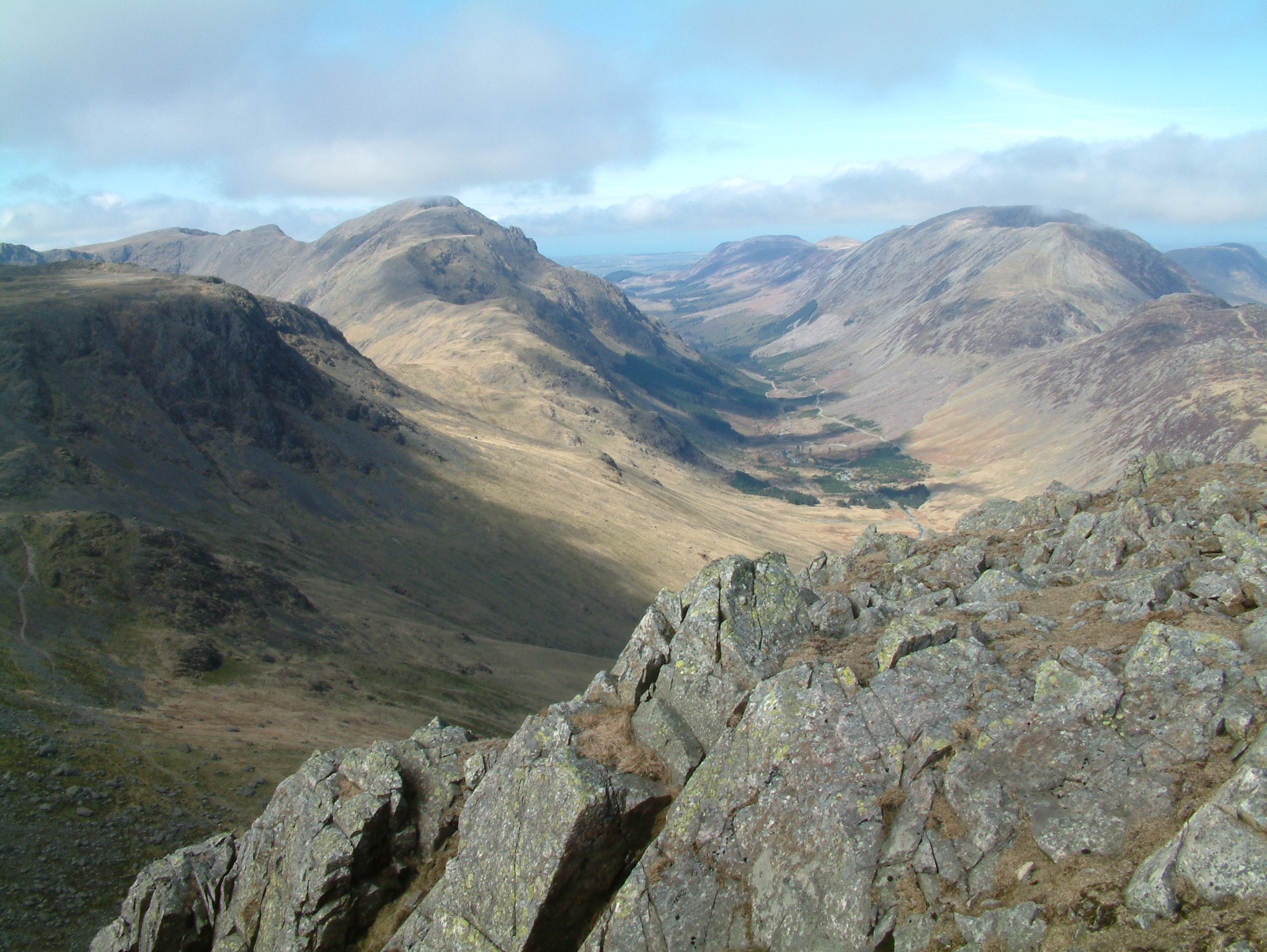
The valley from Green Gable

Due to the remote location, the lack of a public road up the valley, and its management by Forestry England, the National Trust and United Utilities, Ennerdale is relatively unspoiled. Ennerdale Water has not been as affected as other lakes in the National Park by construction, activity on the lake or the trappings of tourism. In 2022 the partners managing Ennerdale, together with Natural England, put together a successful proposal to declare much of the Ennerdale Valley as a National Nature Reserve (NNR).

== Environmental protection ==
There are two biological Sites of Special Scientific Interest (SSSIs) in the valley:

- Ennerdale
- Pillar and Ennerdale Fells SSSI. Pillar and Ennerdale Fells is also protected as a Special Area of Conservation, being one of the ten SSSIs which underpin the High Fells SAC.

=== Rewilding ===
In 2003 the valley's three major landowners formed the Wild Ennerdale Partnership. Working with Natural England, the Government's advisor on the environment, the project has a vision "to allow the evolution of Ennerdale as a wild valley for the benefit of people, relying more on natural processes to shape its landscape and ecology". The project managers have a commitment to maintaining the economic culture of the valley with small-scale forestry work and farming (low-density cattle grazing is replacing sheep).

Wild Ennerdale celebrated its 10th anniversary in June 2013. In October of that year the project was represented at the World Wilderness Congress in Salamanca, Spain. Results of the project included:

- Arctic char (Salvelinus alpinus)

An increase in numbers of this species. The fish spawn in the River Liza, and have benefited from the rewilding of the river.

- Natural woodland.

The habitats protected by Pillar and Ennerdale Fells SSSI include natural woodland such as Side Wood, an example of old sessile oak woods. The trees of Ennerdale are important as an example of altitudinal succession (from "native upland birch-oak woodland at 120 m on the shores of Ennerdale (Water) the vegetation changes through sub-montane heaths and grasslands to montane heaths along the summit ridge at an altitude of 890 m").

The condition of the SSSI's habitats has been assessed as "Unfavourable - Recovering". As a result of the Wild Ennerdale project, there has been a blurring of the divisions between the wooded and non-wooded areas in the valley, although there is arguably not a natural tree line as such. (A natural tree line occurs in only a few places in the British uplands such as Creag Fhiaclach in the Cairngorms: in the Lake District the climatic tree line is estimated to lie at about 535 m).

==== Possible introduction of predators ====
In 2013 George Monbiot published Feral, a book on rewilding, in which he argued that Ennerdale is not very wild in comparison with projects in other countries. He draws attention to the lack of predators in the valley to control the numbers of grazing animals such as deer. In this interpretation, rewilding implies the presence of carnivores to reduce herbivore pressure and enhance trophic diversity.

In March 2015, the Lynx UK Trust announced that Ennerdale was one of three locations in England and Scotland where it wanted to trial the reintroduction of wild Eurasian lynx (a species which preys on deer). However, by 2017 the Trust was proposing Kielder Forest as the preferred site for such a trial.

So far as is known, there are no resident pine martens in Ennerdale, but there is evidence that the species is present in Cumbria. There are discussions about its reintroduction to the valley and breeding boxes have been installed.

== Governance ==
Ennerdale is within the Whitehaven and Workington UK parliamentary constituency.

== Tourism ==
The valley is not much visited by tourists, but it is of interest to walkers and is sited on the "Coast to Coast Walk" devised by Alfred Wainwright.

=== Youth hostels ===
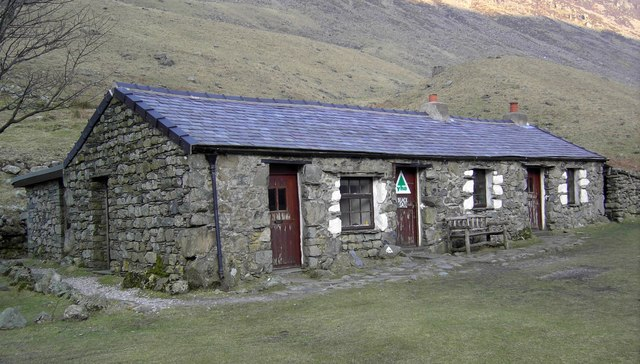
Black Sail hostel

Ennerdale has two youth hostels, Ennerdale and Black Sail. Black Sail (high up the valley near Black Sail Pass), has been described as England's loneliest youth hostel. In 2008 the Youth Hostels Association announced that it would withdraw the warden from Black Sail as Forestry England would no longer maintain the access track as a result of the Ennerdale rewilding project. However, after protests from members the YHA decided to retain the warden service, while at the same time seeking to reduce the hostel's ecological impact.

Low Gillerthwaite Field Centre, which is situated a few hundred metres from Ennerdale Youth Hostel, is adapted from traditional lakeland 17th century farm buildings and offers self-catering accommodation for up to 40 people. It is suitable for use by both groups of young people and adults. The centre is managed by a registered charity.

== Geology ==
Bowness Knott is a geological Site of Special Scientific Interest (SSSI).

=== Proposed nuclear waste facility ===
In June 2012, it became clear that Ennerdale (specifically the Ennerdale granite to the south of Ennerdale Water) had been identified as a potential site for a Geological Disposal Facility for the UK's high and intermediate level nuclear waste. Two other sites had also been identified – Eskdale and the Solway Plain. Ennerdale was not named by the Managing Radioactive Waste Safely (MRWS) Partnership; rather it referred to the 'granitic rocks forming part of the Lake District Batholith'. These are the Ennerdale and Eskdale granites, formed around 450 million years ago in the Ordovician Period. This was stated in (publicly available) document 285 of the West Cumbria MRWS, a letter written by Dr Dearlove, the consultant geologist recruited by MRWS. Three smaller surface exposures of the batholith occur at Shap, Threlkeld and Skiddaw, but these are too small to be considered for the Geological Disposal Facility. In January 2013, Copeland and Allerdale Borough Councils voted to proceed to the next stage (4) of the Managing Radioactive Waste Safely (MRWS) process, but this was vetoed by Cumbria County Council. In September 2013, The Department of Energy and Climate Change (DECC) announced its proposed changes to the MRWS siting process. These included removal of the right of veto from county councils, and a diluted role for parish councils.
