= Ennerdale Water =

Reservoir in the Lake District of England

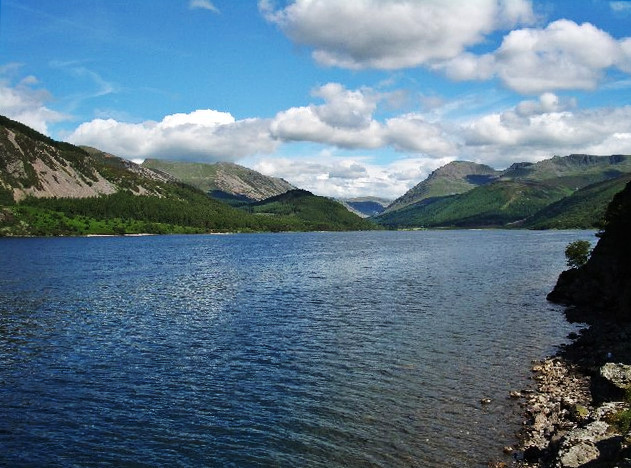

- Location in the Lake District Location in Copeland Borough
- Location: Lake District, Cumbria
- Coordinates: 54°31′12″N 3°22′34″W
- Type: natural lake, reservoir
- Primary inflows: River Liza
- Primary outflows: River Ehen
- Basin countries: England
- Max. length: 4.17 km (2.59 mi)
- Max. width: 1.28 km (0.80 mi)
- Surface area: 3 km^{2} (1.2 sq mi)
- Max. depth: 45 m (148 ft)
- Shore length^{1}: 10 km (6.2 mi)
- Surface elevation: 113 m (371 ft)
- Islands: 4
- ^{1} Shore length is not a well-defined measure.

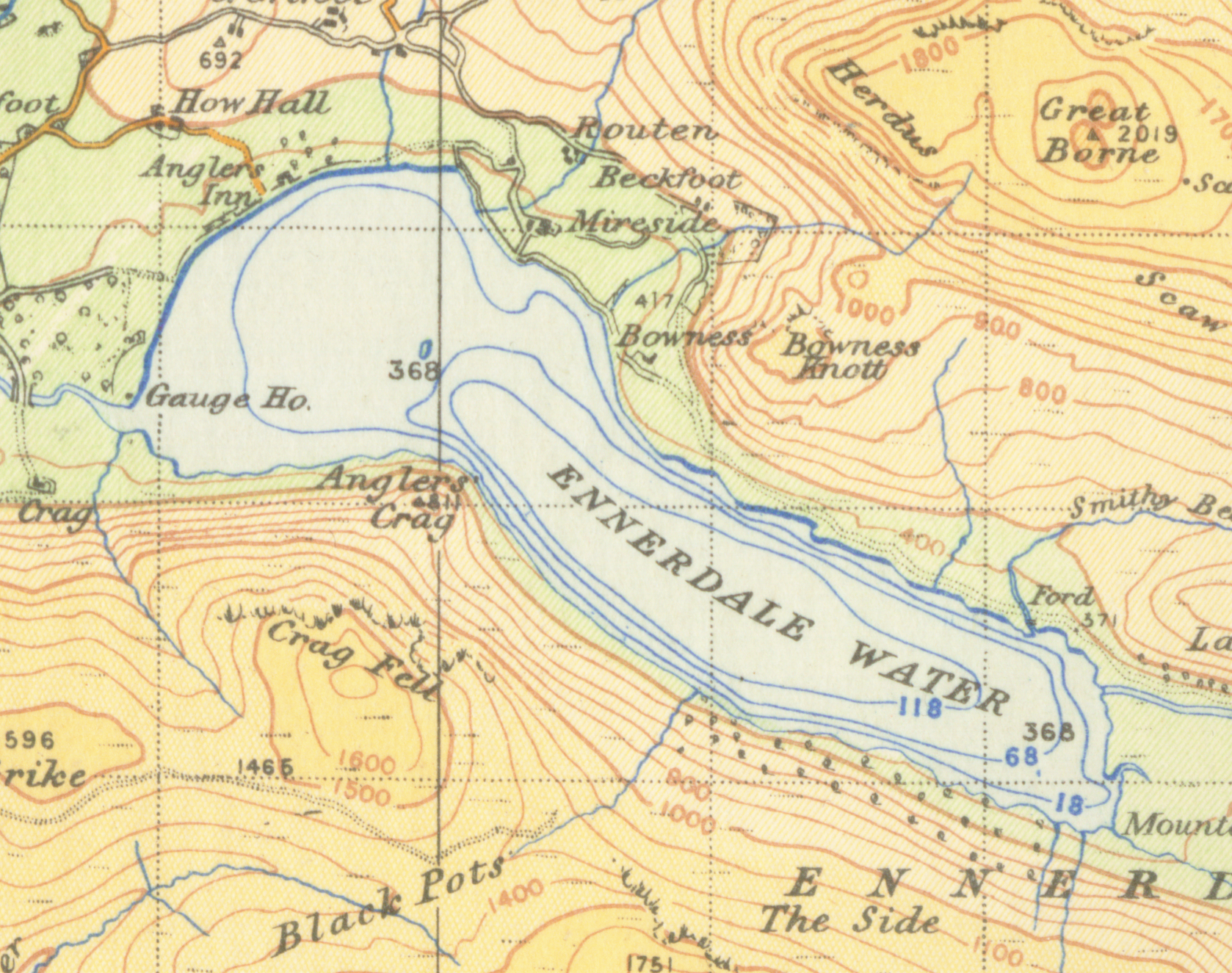
A map of Ennerdale Water from 1948

Ennerdale Water is the most westerly lake in the Lake District National Park in Cumbria, England. It is a glacial lake, with a maximum depth of 150 feet (46 metres), and is 1/2 to 1 mile (800 to 1,600 m) wide and 2 1/2 miles (4.0 kilometres) long.

The lake lies in the eponymous valley of Ennerdale, surrounded by some of the highest and best-known fells in Cumbria including: Great Gable (899 m), Green Gable, Brandreth, High Crag, Steeple and Pillar. To the west of the lake lies the hamlet of Ennerdale Bridge, consisting of two pubs and a few houses. It is close to the port of Whitehaven.

== Toponymy ==
" 'Anund's valley'. The name Ennerdale seems originally to have derived from 'Anundar', genitive sing.[ular] of the ON personal name 'Anundr'/'Ǫnundr', and ON 'dalr' 'valley', but there has been cross-influence between this p.n. and 'Ehen', the name of the river which flows through the valley." (ON is Old Norse.)

The lake has been referred to in guidebooks and maps variously as "Brodewater" (1576), "Brodwater" (1695), "Broad Water" (1760), "Ennerdale Water" (1784) and "Ennerdale Lake" in Otley's Guide (1823). It is now the Ordnance Survey convention to name it "Ennerdale Water".

== Geography ==
Ennerdale Water is fed by the River Liza and other streams, and in turn feeds the River Ehen, which runs to the Irish Sea.

=== Water abstraction ===
Although the lake is natural, in 1902 a shallow weir was added to what is probably a glacial moraine to maintain the level. The lake is owned by United Utilities, which formerly abstracted water to serve customers in the Whitehaven area.

In 2013, United Utilities was informed by the Environment Agency that the abstraction licence was being revoked to protect the environment of Ennerdale and the River Ehen. This meant that United Utilities had to find an alternative water source for customers in West Cumbria. After public consultation, a preferred option to provide water to West Cumbria via a new pipeline from Thirlmere was selected. After a public inquiry in 2014, the independent Planning Inspectors report ruled that the Thirlmere transfer was the right solution and that abstraction from Ennerdale Water would cease by 2022. The construction of the pipeline commenced in 2017. At the same time, United Utilities started to blend water from Ennerdale Water with groundwater from boreholes near Egremont.

== Environmental protection measures ==
Ennerdale has been designated a biological Site of Special Scientific Interest (SSSI). Species of interest include the Arctic char. The site contains a variety of habitats apart from the open water of the lake itself.

== Tourism ==
Despite being sited on Wainwright's coast-to-coast walk, the valley is not much visited by tourists.

Due to the remote location, the lack of a public road up the valley, and its management by the Forestry Commission, the National Trust and United Utilities, Ennerdale Water has not been as spoiled as other lakes in the National Park by construction, activity on the lake or the effects of tourism.

== Notable facts ==
Though the Lake District is a popular UK location for film shoots, Ennerdale has been left relatively in the shadow, with only a few brief exceptions. The closing sequences of the film 28 Days Later (2002), directed by Danny Boyle, were filmed around the Ennerdale area, and include a sweeping, panoramic view of the lake.

In 1810 a large carnivore killed hundreds of sheep in and around Ennerdale before it was hunted down and killed. The locals dubbed it the Girt (dialect: "great") Dog of Ennerdale, though it was said to have had the traits of both a dog and a large cat.

Once a year, during the last week in August, the Ennerdale Show brings local people together with agricultural displays, competitions, arts and crafts.

Former US President Bill Clinton first proposed to his wife Hillary on the banks of Ennerdale Water in 1973.
