= List of United Kingdom locations: Ta-Tha =

The United Kingdom

This is part of the list of United Kingdom locations: a gazetteer of place names in the United Kingdom showing each place's locality and geographical coordinates.

== Ta ==
=== Taa–Tam ===
Location	Locality	Coordinates (links to map & photo sources)	OS grid reference
Tableyhill	Cheshire	53.30°N 02.40°W	SJ7379
Tabor	Gwynedd	52.73°N 03.85°W	SH7517
Tabost	Western Isles	58.07°N 06.54°W	NB3219
Tabost	Western Isles	58.47°N 06.27°W	NB5162
Tachbrook Mallory	Warwickshire	52.25°N 01.54°W	SP3162
Tacker Street	Somerset	51.12°N 03.40°W	ST0237
Tacket Wood	Devon	50.27°N 03.78°W	SX7343
Tackley	Oxfordshire	51.87°N 01.31°W	SP4720
Tacolneston	Norfolk	52.50°N 01.15°E	TM1494
Tadcaster	North Yorkshire	53.88°N 01.27°W	SE4843
Tadden	Dorset	50.80°N 02.02°W	ST9801
Taddington	Derbyshire	53.23°N 01.79°W	SK1471
Taddington	Gloucestershire	51.97°N 01.88°W	SP0831
Taddiport	Devon	50.94°N 04.16°W	SS4818
Tadhill	Somerset	51.21°N 02.45°W	ST6846
Tadley	Hampshire	51.34°N 01.13°W	SU6061
Tadley	Oxfordshire	51.58°N 01.23°W	SU5388
Tadlow	Cambridgeshire	52.10°N 00.13°W	TL2847
Tadmarton	Oxfordshire	52.03°N 01.43°W	SP3937
Tadnoll	Dorset	50.67°N 02.29°W	SY7986
Tadwick	Bath and North East Somerset	51.42°N 02.37°W	ST7470
Tadworth	Surrey	51.29°N 00.25°W	TQ2256
Tafarnaubach	Blaenau Gwent	51.78°N 03.29°W	SO1110
Tafarn-y-bwlch	Pembrokeshire	51.96°N 04.79°W	SN0833
Tafarn-y-Gelyn	Denbighshire	53.14°N 03.22°W	SJ1861
Taff Merthyr Garden Village	Merthyr Tydfil	51.66°N 03.30°W	ST1097
Taffs Well	Rhondda Cynon Taff	51.53°N 03.27°W	ST1283
Tafolwern	Powys	52.60°N 03.64°W	SH8902
Tafts Ness	Orkney Islands	59.31°N 02.42°W	HY758472
Tahay	Western Isles	57.66°N 07.09°W	NF962748
Taibach	Neath Port Talbot	51.58°N 03.77°W	SS7789
Tai-morfa	Gwynedd	52.80°N 04.55°W	SH2826
Tain	Highland	57.80°N 04.05°W	NH7881
Tai-nant	Wrexham	53.00°N 03.08°W	SJ2746
Tairbeart (Tarbert)	Western Isles	57.89°N 06.81°W	NB1500
Tai'r-Bull	Powys	51.91°N 03.46°W	SN9925
Tairgwaith	Neath Port Talbot	51.79°N 03.87°W	SN7112
Tai'r-heol	Caerphilly	51.63°N 03.30°W	ST1094
Tai'r-ysgol	Swansea	51.65°N 03.89°W	SS6997
Takeley	Essex	51.86°N 00.26°E	TL5621
Takeley Street	Essex	51.86°N 00.23°E	TL5421
Talachddu	Powys	51.98°N 03.34°W	SO0833
Talacre	Flintshire	53.34°N 03.32°W	SJ1284
Talardd	Gwynedd	52.82°N 03.64°W	SH8926
Talaton	Devon	50.78°N 03.33°W	SY0699
Talbenny	Pembrokeshire	51.75°N 05.14°W	SM8311
Talbot Green	Rhondda, Cynon, Taff	51.52°N 03.39°W	ST0382
Talbot Heath	Poole	50.73°N 01.91°W	SZ0693
Talbot's End	South Gloucestershire	51.60°N 02.43°W	ST7090
Talbot Village	Bournemouth	50.74°N 01.90°W	SZ0794
Talbot Woods	Bournemouth	50.72°N 01.90°W	SZ0792
Taleford	Devon	50.75°N 03.29°W	SY0996
Talerddig	Powys	52.58°N 03.58°W	SH9300
Talewater	Devon	50.78°N 03.30°W	SY0899
Talgarreg	Ceredigion	52.13°N 04.31°W	SN4251
Talgarth	Powys	51.98°N 03.23°W	SO1533
Talgarth's Well	Swansea	51.56°N 04.28°W	SS4288
Talisker	Highland	57.28°N 06.44°W	NG3230
Talke	Staffordshire	53.07°N 02.27°W	SJ8253
Talke Pits	Staffordshire	53.06°N 02.27°W	SJ8252
Talkin	Cumbria	54.90°N 02.71°W	NY5457
Talladale	Highland	57.67°N 05.50°W	NG9170
Talla Linnfoots	Scottish Borders	55.46°N 03.37°W	NT1320
Talland	Cornwall	50.33°N 04.50°W	SX2251
Tallarn Green	Wrexham	52.99°N 02.83°W	SJ4444
Tallentire	Cumbria	54.70°N 03.39°W	NY1035
Talley	Carmarthenshire	51.96°N 03.99°W	SN6332
Tallington	Lincolnshire	52.65°N 00.38°W	TF0908
Talmine	Highland	58.52°N 04.44°W	NC5862
Talog	Carmarthenshire	51.89°N 04.42°W	SN3325
Talsarn	Carmarthenshire	51.91°N 03.79°W	SN7726
Tal-sarn	Ceredigion	52.18°N 04.13°W	SN5456
Talsarnau	Gwynedd	52.89°N 04.06°W	SH6135
Talskiddy	Cornwall	50.44°N 04.94°W	SW9165
Talwrn	Isle of Anglesey	53.26°N 04.26°W	SH4977
Talwrn (Coedpoeth)	Wrexham	53.05°N 03.07°W	SJ2851
Talwrn (Esclusham)	Wrexham	53.01°N 03.05°W	SJ2947
Tal-y-bont	Ceredigion	52.48°N 03.98°W	SN6589
Tal-y-bont (Bangor)	Gwynedd	53.20°N 04.09°W	SH6070
Tal-y-bont (Barmouth)	Gwynedd	52.76°N 04.10°W	SH5821
Tal-y-Bont	Conwy	53.19°N 03.85°W	SH7668
Talybont-on-Usk	Powys	51.88°N 03.29°W	SO1122
Tal-y-cafn	Conwy	53.22°N 03.81°W	SH7971
Tal-y-coed	Monmouthshire	51.83°N 02.85°W	SO4115
Talyllyn	Powys	51.93°N 03.31°W	SO1027
Tal-y-llyn	Gwynedd	52.66°N 03.90°W	SH7109
Talysarn	Gwynedd	53.05°N 04.26°W	SH4853
Tal-y-waenydd	Gwynedd	53.00°N 03.95°W	SH6947
Talywain	Torfaen	51.73°N 03.07°W	SO2604
Tal-y-Wern	Powys	52.58°N 03.74°W	SH8200
Tame Bridge	North Yorkshire	54.46°N 01.23°W	NZ5008
Tamer Lane End	Wigan	53.50°N 02.55°W	SD6301
Tamerton Foliot	Devon	50.42°N 04.15°W	SX4761
Tame Water	Oldham	53.55°N 02.03°W	SD9806
Tamfourhill	Falkirk	55.99°N 03.84°W	NS8580
Tamworth	Staffordshire	52.62°N 01.67°W	SK2203
Tamworth Green	Lincolnshire	52.95°N 00.05°E	TF3842

=== Tan–Taz ===
Location	Locality	Coordinates (links to map & photo sources)	OS grid reference
Tancred	North Yorkshire	54.01°N 01.31°W	SE4558
Tandem	Kirklees	53.64°N 01.74°W	SE1716
Tanden	Kent	51.10°N 00.72°E	TQ9138
Tandlehill	Renfrewshire	55.82°N 04.55°W	NS4062
Tandridge	Surrey	51.23°N 00.03°W	TQ3750
Tanera Beag	Highland	58.00°N 05.44°W	NB964074
Tanera Mòr	Highland	58.00°N 05.40°W	NB992067
Tanerdy	Carmarthenshire	51.86°N 04.29°W	SN4221
Tanfield	Durham	54.88°N 01.72°W	NZ1855
Tanfield Lea	Durham	54.88°N 01.72°W	NZ1854
Tang	North Yorkshire	54.00°N 01.65°W	SE2357
Tangasdale	Western Isles	56.97°N 07.51°W	NF6500
Tang Hall	York	53.96°N 01.05°W	SE6252
Tangiers	Pembrokeshire	51.82°N 04.97°W	SM9518
Tangley	Hampshire	51.26°N 01.52°W	SU3352
Tanglwst	Carmarthenshire	51.97°N 04.46°W	SN3134
Tangmere	West Sussex	50.84°N 00.72°W	SU9006
Tangwick	Shetland Islands	60.47°N 01.58°W	HU2377
Tan Hills	Durham	54.81°N 01.61°W	NZ2547
Tan Hinon	Powys	52.45°N 03.63°W	SN8985
Tanhouse	Lancashire	53.53°N 02.77°W	SD4905
Tanis	Wiltshire	51.35°N 02.03°W	ST9862
Tankersley	Barnsley	53.48°N 01.48°W	SK3499
Tankerton	Kent	51.35°N 01.04°E	TR1266
Tanlan	Flintshire	53.32°N 03.32°W	SJ1282
Tan-lan	Conwy	53.15°N 03.81°W	SH7963
Tan-lan	Gwynedd	52.95°N 04.07°W	SH6142
Tanlan Banks	Flintshire	53.33°N 03.33°W	SJ1183
Tannach	Highland	58.40°N 03.16°W	ND3247
Tannadice	Angus	56.71°N 02.86°W	NO4758
Tannaraidh	Western Isles	58.12°N 06.41°W	NB400234
Tanner's Green	Worcestershire	52.36°N 01.88°W	SP0874
Tannington Place	Suffolk	52.25°N 01.26°E	TM2367
Tannochside	North Lanarkshire	55.82°N 04.07°W	NS7061
Tan Office	Suffolk	52.22°N 01.07°E	TM1063
Tan Office Green	Suffolk	52.19°N 00.60°E	TL7858
Tanshall	Fife	56.18°N 03.21°W	NO2500
Tansley	Derbyshire	53.12°N 01.52°W	SK3259
Tansley Hill	Dudley	52.49°N 02.07°W	SO9589
Tansley Knoll	Derbyshire	53.13°N 01.52°W	SK3260
Tansor	Northamptonshire	52.50°N 00.45°W	TL0591
Tansterne	East Riding of Yorkshire	53.82°N 00.14°W	TA2237
Tanterton	Lancashire	53.78°N 02.74°W	SD5132
Tantobie	Durham	54.88°N 01.73°W	NZ1754
Tanton	North Yorkshire	54.88°N 01.19°W	NZ5210
Tanwood	Worcestershire	52.36°N 02.14°W	SO9074
Tanworth-in-Arden	Warwickshire	52.32°N 01.83°W	SP1170
Tan-y-bwlch	Gwynedd	52.94°N 04.01°W	SH6540
Tanyfron	Wrexham	53.06°N 03.06°W	SJ2952
Tan-y-fron	Conwy	53.16°N 03.57°W	SH9564
Tanygrisiau	Gwynedd	52.98°N 03.96°W	SH6845
Tan-y-groes	Ceredigion	52.11°N 04.51°W	SN2849
Tan-y-mynydd	Gwynedd	52.84°N 04.49°W	SH3230
Tan-yr-allt	Denbighshire	53.30°N 03.41°W	SJ0680
Tanysgafell	Gwynedd	53.17°N 04.08°W	SH6166
Taobh a Deas Loch Aineort	Western Isles	57.22°N 07.37°W	NF7628
Taobh a' Ghlinne	Western Isles	58.04°N 06.45°W	NB3715
Taobh a Tuath Loch Aineort	Western Isles	57.23°N 07.35°W	NF7729
Taobh Siar	Western Isles	57.89°N 06.82°W	NB1400
Taplow	Buckinghamshire	51.52°N 00.68°W	SU9182
Tapnage	Hampshire	50.88°N 01.21°W	SU5510
Tapton	Derbyshire	53.24°N 01.41°W	SK3972
Tapton Hill	Sheffield	53.37°N 01.52°W	SK3286
Taransay	Western Isles	57.90°N 07.02°W	NB026015
Taransay Glorigs	Western Isles	57.94°N 07.13°W	NA964068
Tarbat Ness	Highland	57.86°N 03.78°W	NH940872
Tarbert (Kintyre)	Argyll and Bute	55.85°N 05.42°W	NR8668
Tarbert (Jura)	Argyll and Bute	55.97°N 05.83°W	NR6182
Tarbert (Tairbeart)	Western Isles	57.89°N 06.81°W	NB1500
Tarbet	Argyll and Bute	56.19°N 04.72°W	NN3104
Tarbet (Sutherland)	Highland	58.39°N 05.14°W	NC1649
Tarbet (Lochaber)	Highland	56.96°N 05.63°W	NM7992
Tarbock Green	Knowsley	53.37°N 02.81°W	SJ4687
Tarbolton	South Ayrshire	55.51°N 04.48°W	NS4327
Tarbrax	South Lanarkshire	55.77°N 03.56°W	NT0255
Tardebigge	Worcestershire	52.31°N 02.01°W	SO9969
Tardy Gate	Lancashire	53.71°N 02.71°W	SD5325
Tarfside	Angus	56.90°N 02.83°W	NO4979
Tarland	Aberdeenshire	57.12°N 02.86°W	NJ4804
Tarleton	Lancashire	53.67°N 02.83°W	SD4520
Tarleton Moss	Lancashire	53.68°N 02.86°W	SD4321
Tarlscough	Lancashire	53.61°N 02.86°W	SD4314
Tarlton	Gloucestershire	51.68°N 02.07°W	ST9599
Tarn	Bradford	53.84°N 01.75°W	SE1639
Tarnbrook	Lancashire	53.98°N 02.64°W	SD5855
Tarner Island	Highland	57.35°N 06.49°W	NG298387
Tarnock	Somerset	51.26°N 02.90°W	ST3752
Tarns	Cumbria	54.81°N 03.38°W	NY1147
Tarnside	Cumbria	54.30°N 02.87°W	SD4390
Tarporley	Cheshire	53.15°N 02.67°W	SJ5562
Tarpots	Essex	51.56°N 00.53°E	TQ7688
Tarraby	Cumbria	54.91°N 02.93°W	NY4058
Tarrant Crawford	Dorset	50.82°N 02.11°W	ST9203
Tarrant Gunville	Dorset	50.90°N 02.11°W	ST9212
Tarrant Hinton	Dorset	50.89°N 02.10°W	ST9311
Tarrant Keyneston	Dorset	50.83°N 02.11°W	ST9204
Tarrant Launceston	Dorset	50.88°N 02.08°W	ST9409
Tarrant Monkton	Dorset	50.87°N 02.08°W	ST9408
Tarrant Rushton	Dorset	50.84°N 02.10°W	ST9305
Tarring Neville	East Sussex	50.80°N 00.04°E	TQ4403
Tarrington	Herefordshire	52.05°N 02.57°W	SO6140
Tarrington Common	Herefordshire	52.04°N 02.57°W	SO6139
Tarskavaig	Highland	57.10°N 05.99°W	NG5809
Tarts Hill	Shropshire	52.93°N 02.84°W	SJ4338
Tarves	Aberdeenshire	57.36°N 02.23°W	NJ8631
Tarvin	Cheshire	53.18°N 02.77°W	SJ4866
Tarvin Sands	Cheshire	53.19°N 02.76°W	SJ4967
Tasburgh	Norfolk	52.50°N 01.24°E	TM2095
Tasley	Shropshire	52.54°N 02.45°W	SO6994
Taston	Oxfordshire	51.88°N 01.49°W	SP3521
Tat Bank	Sandwell	52.49°N 02.01°W	SO9989
Tatenhill	Staffordshire	52.78°N 01.70°W	SK2021
Tatenhill Common	Staffordshire	52.79°N 01.71°W	SK1922
Tathall End	Milton Keynes	52.10°N 00.80°W	SP8246
Tatham	Lancashire	54.11°N 02.61°W	SD6069
Tathwell	Lincolnshire	53.31°N 00.01°W	TF3282
Tatling End	Buckinghamshire	51.57°N 00.54°W	TQ0187
Tatsfield	Surrey	51.29°N 00.02°E	TQ4157
Tattenhall	Cheshire	53.11°N 02.77°W	SJ4858
Tattenhoe	Milton Keynes	51.99°N 00.79°W	SP8334
Tatterford	Norfolk	52.81°N 00.75°E	TF8628
Tattersett	Norfolk	52.82°N 00.72°E	TF8429
Tattershall	Lincolnshire	53.10°N 00.19°W	TF2158
Tattershall Bridge	Lincolnshire	53.08°N 00.22°W	TF1956
Tattershall Thorpe	Lincolnshire	53.11°N 00.19°W	TF2159
Tattingstone	Suffolk	51.99°N 01.10°E	TM1337
Tattingstone White Horse	Suffolk	51.99°N 01.10°E	TM1338
Tattle Bank	Warwickshire	52.26°N 01.73°W	SP1863
Tatton Dale	Cheshire	53.33°N 02.39°W	SJ7482
Tatworth	Somerset	50.84°N 02.96°W	ST3205
Taunton	Somerset	51.01°N 03.09°W	ST2324
Taunton	Tameside	53.49°N 02.12°W	SD9200
Taverham	Norfolk	52.68°N 01.19°E	TG1614
Taverners Green	Essex	51.83°N 00.26°E	TL5618
Tavernspite	Pembrokeshire	51.77°N 04.63°W	SN1812
Tavistock	Devon	50.54°N 04.14°W	SX4874
Taw Green	Devon	50.75°N 03.91°W	SX6597
Tawstock	Devon	51.04°N 04.06°W	SS5529
Taxal	Derbyshire	53.30°N 02.00°W	SK0079
Tayinloan	Argyll and Bute	55.65°N 05.67°W	NR6946
Taymouth Castle	Perth and Kinross	56.59°N 03.98°W	NN7846
Taynton	Gloucestershire	51.88°N 02.39°W	SO7321
Taynton	Oxfordshire	51.81°N 01.66°W	SP2313
Taynuilt	Argyll and Bute	56.42°N 05.24°W	NN0031
Tayport	Fife	56.44°N 02.89°W	NO4528
Tayvallich	Argyll and Bute	56.02°N 05.62°W	NR7487
Tayvullin	Argyll and Bute	56.00°N 05.65°W	NR7285

== Te ==
Location	Locality	Coordinates (links to map & photo sources)	OS grid reference
Tea Green	Hertfordshire	51.89°N 00.35°W	TL1323
Tealby	Lincolnshire	53.39°N 00.27°W	TF1590
Tealing	Angus	56.53°N 02.96°W	NO4138
Teams	Gateshead	54.95°N 01.64°W	NZ2362
Team Valley	Gateshead	54.93°N 01.62°W	NZ2460
Tean	Isles of Scilly	49.96°N 06.31°W	SV910166
Teanford	Staffordshire	52.95°N 02.00°W	SK0040
Teangue	Highland	57.11°N 05.86°W	NG6609
Teasley Mead	East Sussex	51.13°N 00.14°E	TQ5039
Tebay	Cumbria	54.43°N 02.60°W	NY6104
Tebworth	Bedfordshire	51.92°N 00.56°W	SP9926
Tedburn St Mary	Devon	50.73°N 03.68°W	SX8194
Teddington	Gloucestershire	51.99°N 02.05°W	SO9633
Teddington	Richmond Upon Thames	51.41°N 00.33°W	TQ1670
Teddington Hands	Gloucestershire	52.00°N 02.05°W	SO9634
Tedsmore	Shropshire	52.81°N 02.93°W	SJ3725
Tedstone Delamere	Herefordshire	52.21°N 02.45°W	SO6958
Tedstone Wafer	Herefordshire	52.22°N 02.48°W	SO6759
Teesville	Redcar and Cleveland	54.56°N 01.16°W	NZ5419
Teeton	Northamptonshire	52.32°N 00.98°W	SP6970
Teffont Evias	Wiltshire	51.07°N 02.02°W	ST9831
Teffont Magna	Wiltshire	51.08°N 02.02°W	ST9832
Tegryn	Pembrokeshire	51.97°N 04.58°W	SN229331
Teigh	Rutland	52.73°N 00.72°W	SK8616
Teigngrace	Devon	50.54°N 03.63°W	SX8473
Teignmouth	Devon	50.54°N 03.49°W	SX9473
Teign Village	Devon	50.61°N 03.65°W	SX8381
Telegraph Hill	Lewisham	51.466°N 0.044°W	TQ359760
Telford	Telford and Wrekin	52.67°N 02.45°W	SJ6909
Telham	East Sussex	50.89°N 00.50°E	TQ7614
Tellisford	Somerset	51.29°N 02.28°W	ST8055
Telscombe	East Sussex	50.80°N 00.01°W	TQ4003
Telscombe Cliffs	East Sussex	50.79°N 00.01°W	TQ4001
Templand	Dumfries and Galloway	55.16°N 03.44°W	NY0886
Temple	Berkshire	51.54°N 00.78°W	SU8484
Temple	Cornwall	50.52°N 04.62°W	SX1473
Temple	City of Glasgow	55.89°N 04.33°W	NS5469
Temple	Midlothian	55.81°N 03.10°W	NT3158
Temple	Wiltshire	51.19°N 02.25°W	ST8244
Temple Balsall	Solihull	52.37°N 01.70°W	SP2075
Temple Bar	Carmarthenshire	51.83°N 04.06°W	SN5817
Temple Bar	Ceredigion	52.16°N 04.15°W	SN5354
Temple Bar	West Sussex	50.85°N 00.73°W	SU8907
Templeborough	Sheffield	53.41°N 01.39°W	SK4091
Temple Cloud	Bath and North East Somerset	51.31°N 02.54°W	ST6257
Templecombe	Somerset	50.99°N 02.42°W	ST7022
Temple Cowley	Oxfordshire	51.73°N 01.21°W	SP5404
Temple End	Essex	52.05°N 00.65°E	TL8243
Temple End	Suffolk	52.12°N 00.42°E	TL6650
Temple Ewell	Kent	51.15°N 01.25°E	TR2844
Temple Fields	Essex	51.78°N 00.11°E	TL4612
Temple Grafton	Warwickshire	52.18°N 01.82°W	SP1254
Temple Guiting	Gloucestershire	51.95°N 01.87°W	SP0928
Templehall	Angus	56.50°N 02.83°W	NO4935
Templehall	Fife	56.12°N 03.19°W	NT2693
Templehall	Perth and Kinross	56.43°N 03.12°W	NO3127
Temple Herdewyke	Warwickshire	52.16°N 01.46°W	SP3752
Temple Hill	Kent	51.45°N 00.22°E	TQ5575
Temple Hirst	North Yorkshire	53.71°N 01.09°W	SE6025
Templeman's Ash	Dorset	50.79°N 02.85°W	ST4000
Temple Mills	Newham	51.54°N 00.02°W	TQ3785
Temple Normanton	Derbyshire	53.19°N 01.38°W	SK4167
Temple Sowerby	Cumbria	54.63°N 02.60°W	NY6127
Templeton	Angus	56.61°N 02.63°W	NO6147
Templeton	Berkshire	51.39°N 01.49°W	SU3566
Templeton	Devon	50.91°N 03.59°W	SS8814
Templeton	Pembrokeshire	51.76°N 04.74°W	SN1111
Templeton Bridge	Devon	50.91°N 03.60°W	SS8714
Templetown	Durham	54.83°N 01.84°W	NZ1049
Tempsford	Bedfordshire	52.16°N 00.30°W	TL1653
Ten Acres	Birmingham	52.42°N 01.92°W	SP0581
Tenandry	Perth and Kinross	56.72°N 03.78°W	NN9161
Tenbury Wells	Worcestershire	52.29°N 02.60°W	SO5967
Tenby (Dinbych-y-pysgod)	Pembrokeshire	51.66°N 04.70°W	SN1300
Tencreek	Cornwall	50.34°N 04.48°W	SX2352
Tendring	Essex	51.87°N 01.10°E	TM1424
Tendring Green	Essex	51.88°N 01.10°E	TM1425
Tendring Heath	Essex	51.89°N 01.09°E	TM1326
Ten Mile Bank	Norfolk	52.53°N 00.35°E	TL6096
Tenston	Orkney Islands	59.02°N 03.27°W	HY2716
Tenterden	Kent	51.06°N 00.68°E	TQ8833
Terfyn	Conwy	53.27°N 03.63°W	SH9177
Terfyn	Gwynedd	53.12°N 04.10°W	SH5961
Terhill	Somerset	51.08°N 03.18°W	ST1732
Terling	Essex	51.80°N 00.56°E	TL7715
Ternhill	Shropshire	52.88°N 02.55°W	SJ6332
Terregles	Dumfries and Galloway	55.07°N 03.67°W	NX9377
Terrible Down	East Sussex	50.91°N 00.11°E	TQ4915
Terrick	Buckinghamshire	51.76°N 00.79°W	SP8308
Terriers	Buckinghamshire	51.63°N 00.74°W	SU8794
Terrington	North Yorkshire	54.12°N 00.97°W	SE6770
Terrington St Clement	Norfolk	52.74°N 00.28°E	TF5419
Terrington St John	Norfolk	52.70°N 00.26°E	TF5314
Terry's Green	Warwickshire	52.35°N 01.85°W	SP1073
Terwick Common	West Sussex	51.00°N 00.84°W	SU8124
Teston	Kent	51.25°N 00.43°E	TQ7053
Testwood	Hampshire	50.92°N 01.50°W	SU3514
Tetbury	Gloucestershire	51.63°N 02.16°W	ST8993
Tetbury Upton	Gloucestershire	51.65°N 02.17°W	ST8895
Tetchill	Shropshire	52.88°N 02.90°W	SJ3932
Tetchwick	Buckinghamshire	51.85°N 01.02°W	SP6718
Tetcott	Devon	50.73°N 04.36°W	SX3396
Tetford	Lincolnshire	53.24°N 00.01°W	TF3374
Tetley	North Lincolnshire	53.59°N 00.83°W	SE7711
Tetney	Lincolnshire	53.48°N 00.02°W	TA3101
Tetney Lock	Lincolnshire	53.49°N 00.01°E	TA3402
Tetsworth	Oxfordshire	51.71°N 01.01°W	SP6802
Tettenhall	Wolverhampton	52.59°N 02.17°W	SJ8800
Tettenhall Wood	Wolverhampton	52.58°N 02.19°W	SO8799
Tetworth	Cambridgeshire	52.16°N 00.23°W	TL2153
Teuchar	Aberdeenshire	57.53°N 02.33°W	NJ8049
Teversal	Nottinghamshire	53.14°N 01.28°W	SK4861
Teversham	Cambridgeshire	52.20°N 00.17°E	TL4958
Teviothead	Scottish Borders	55.33°N 02.94°W	NT4005
Tewin	Hertfordshire	51.81°N 00.15°W	TL2714
Tewin Wood	Hertfordshire	51.82°N 00.15°W	TL2716
Tewitfield	Lancashire	54.15°N 02.73°W	SD5273
Tewkesbury	Gloucestershire	51.98°N 02.16°W	SO8932
Texa	Argyll and Bute	55.61°N 06.14°W	NR391435
Teynham	Kent	51.32°N 00.79°E	TQ9562
Teynham Street	Kent	51.33°N 00.81°E	TQ9663

== Th ==
=== Tha ===
Location	Locality	Coordinates (links to map & photo sources)	OS grid reference
Thackley	Bradford	53.83°N 01.74°W	SE1738
Thackley End	Bradford	53.83°N 01.74°W	SE1738
Thackthwaite	Cumbria	54.59°N 03.33°W	NY1423
Thakeham	West Sussex	50.94°N 00.43°W	TQ1017
Thame	Oxfordshire	51.73°N 00.98°W	SP7005
Thames Ditton	Surrey	51.39°N 00.34°W	TQ1567
Thames Head	Gloucestershire	51.68°N 02.03°W	ST9899
Thamesmead	Bexley/Greenwich	51.50°N 00.11°E	TQ4780
Thamesmead North	Bexley	51.510°N 00.124°E	TQ475812
Thamesmead West	Greenwich	51.494°N 00.083°E	TQ447793
Thanington	Kent	51.26°N 01.05°E	TR1356
Thankerton	South Lanarkshire	55.62°N 03.63°W	NS9738
Tharston	Norfolk	52.50°N 01.21°E	TM1894
Thatcham	Berkshire	51.39°N 01.26°W	SU5167
Thatto Heath	St Helens	53.43°N 02.75°W	SJ5093
Thaxted	Essex	51.95°N 00.34°E	TL6131
