= Templeton =

Templeton is a Scots-English surname and also may refer to:

== Places ==
- Templeton station, Richmond, British Columbia, Canada
- Templeton, New Zealand
- Templeton Hospital, New Zealand

=== United Kingdom ===
- Templeton, Angus, Scotland
- Templeton, Devon, England
- Templeton, Pembrokeshire, Wales
  - RAF Templeton
- Templeton, near Gatehead, East Ayrshire, Scotland
- Templeton, West Berkshire, England; See List of United Kingdom locations: Ta-Tha
- Templeton College, Oxford, England

=== United States ===
- Templeton, California
- Templeton, Indiana
- Templeton, Iowa
- Templeton, Massachusetts
- Templeton, Virginia

== Organisations ==
- James Templeton & Co, a Scottish textile company
- Franklin Templeton Investments, an American holding company
- John Templeton Foundation, a philanthropic organization with a spiritual or religious inclination

== People ==
=== Surname ===
- Alan Templeton, American geneticist and statistician
- Alec Templeton (1909/10–1963), Welsh-American musician
- Alexandra Templeton (born 1969), British lecturer
- Bert Templeton (1940–2003), Canadian junior ice hockey coach
- Brad Templeton (born 1960), Canadian software engineer and entrepreneur
- Charles Templeton (disambiguation), several people
- Danny Templeton, Scottish footballer active 1916–22
- David J. Templeton (1954–1997), Irish Presbyterian minister, murder victim
- David Templeton (born 1989), Scottish footballer
- Deanna Templeton (born 1969), American artist working primarily in photography
- Dink Templeton (1897–1962), American athlete and track and field coach
- Ed Templeton (born 1972), American professional skateboarder
- Edith Templeton (1916–2006), European novelist
- Evie Templeton (born 2008), British actress
- Fay Templeton (1865–1939), American stage actress
- Garry Templeton (born 1956), Major League Baseball player
- Henry Templeton (born 1963), Scottish footballer
- Herminie Templeton Kavanagh (1861–1933), Irish-American writer
- Hugh Templeton (born 1929), New Zealand politician
- Ian Templeton (born 1929), New Zealand journalist
- James Templeton, Scottish footballer active 1897–1903
- John Templeton (1912–2008), British businessman and philanthropist
- John Templeton (disambiguation), several people
- Kelvin Templeton (born 1956), Australian rules footballer
- Malcolm Templeton (1924–2017), New Zealand diplomat
- Mark Templeton (disambiguation), several people
- Nathan Templeton (journalist), Australian sports presenter and reporter
- Rini Templeton (1935–1986), American graphic artist
- Rich Templeton, CEO and chairman of Texas Instruments
- Robert Templeton (disambiguation), several people
- Sara Templeton (born 1971), New Zealand politician
- Suzie Templeton (born 1967), British animator
- Thomas W. Templeton (1867–1935), American congressman
- Ty Templeton (born 1962), Canadian comic book artist
- William Templeton (disambiguation), several people

=== Given name ===
- Templeton Crocker (1884–1948), American philanthropist
- Templeton Fox (1916–1993), American actress
- Templeton Thompson, American singer-songwriter

== Fictional characters ==
- Templeton the Rat, in the American children's novel Charlotte's Web and its film adaptations
- Templeton Peck, in the American TV series The A-Team
- Nathan Templeton (Commander in Chief), in the American TV series Commander in Chief
- Timothy Leslie Templeton, in The Boss Baby and The Boss Baby: Back in Business
- Janice, Bill and Ivy Templeton, in Frank De Felitta's novel Audrey Rose and the film adaptation

== Other uses ==
- Templeton Prize, philanthropic award offered by the Templeton Foundation
- Templeton Rye, a brand of rye whiskey originating in Templeton, Iowa

== See also ==
- Templeton Rye, American rye whisky brand of Templeton Rye Spirits
