= Tabley =

Tabley is a name that is a component of several place names around where the M6 motorway and A556 cross (M6 junction 19) in Cheshire, England. It comes from Anglo-Saxon Tabban-lēah = "Tabba's clearing or meadow", and may refer to:

- Tabley House, an 18th-century Palladian mansion at Tabley Inferior
  - Baron de Tabley
- Tabley Inferior, a civil parish in the Borough of Cheshire East
- Tabley Superior (or Over Tabley), a civil parish in the Borough of Cheshire East
- Tableyhill or Tabley Hill, a hamlet near Tabley Superior
