= Lilia (disambiguation) =

Lilia may refer to:

== People ==
- Lilia (name), including a list of people with the name

== Science ==
- Lilia: old name for order of plants, now known as Liliales
- Lilia (bug): Name of a genus in the family of Anthocoridae

== History ==
- Lilia: Pit traps dug by Romans
