= Listed buildings in Aldbrough, East Riding of Yorkshire =

Aldbrough is a civil parish in the county of the East Riding of Yorkshire, England. It contains eight listed buildings that are recorded in the National Heritage List for England. Of these, one is listed at Grade II*, the middle of the three grades, and the others are at Grade II, the lowest grade. The parish contains the village of Aldbrough and the surrounding countryside. Most of the listed buildings are houses, and the others are a church, a public house and a pigeon house.

== Key ==
Grade	Criteria
II*	Particularly important buildings of more than special interest
II	Buildings of national importance and special interest

== Buildings ==
Name and location	Photograph	Date	Notes	Grade
St Bartholomew's Church; 53.82984°N 0.11111°W		11th century or earlier	The church has been altered and extended through the centuries. Apart from the tower and the chancel, it was rebuilt in 1870–71, and the tower was restored in 1908–08 by Temple Moore. The church is built in coursed cobbles with a slate roof, and consists of a nave with a clerestory, north and south aisles, a south porch, a chancel with a north chapel, and a west tower. The tower has three stages, a moulded plinth, angle buttresses, quoins, moulded string courses, a two-light west window, lancet windows on the lower stages, bell openings with two or three lights, a west clock face, and a dentilled brick parapet. The south wall of the chancel has a priest's door, and contains an early carved stone.	II*
Bewick Hall; 53.83593°N 0.12819°W	—	1636	A rear wing was added to the house in the mid-18th century, and it was remodelled in the early 19th century. It is in orange brick with a dentilled eaves cornice, and a slate roof. There are two storeys and four bays. The door has a fanlight, the windows are sashes, and all the openings on the front have segmental brick arches. The gable ends and rear are on a chamfered plinth, and have floor bands.	II
George and Dragon Public House; 53.82851°N 0.11595°W		Late 17th to early 18th century	The public house is in colourwashed brick, with a stepped and dentilled eaves cornice, and a pantile roof with raised gables. There are two storeys and a front of three bays. On the front is a tripartite sash window, to its right is a bow window, and further to the right is a canted bay window. The upper floor contains 20th-century windows flanking a blank centre. On the right return is a doorway with attached Tuscan columns, a frieze with festoons, a dentilled cornice and a pediment.	II
16 Cross Street; 53.82936°N 0.11310°W	—	Mid-18th century	The house is in red brick, and has a pantile roof with raised coped gables. There are two storeys, three bays, and a double depth plan. The doorway has a fanlight, and the windows are sashes. The ground floor openings have wedge lintels.	II
Low Fosham Farmhouse and flanking wings 53.83116°N 0.16440°W		Late 18th century	The house is in red brick, the main block is rendered, and it has a pantile roof with raised coped gables. There are two storeys and three bays, and flanking single-storey wings. The central doorway has pilasters, and the windows are sashes with cambered and channelled wedge lintels. The wings have coped ramped parapets and contain sash windows.	II
Pigeon house, Crosmere Hill; 53.81898°N 0.10379°W		Late 18th century	The pigeon house is in orange brick, with a stepped eaves cornice, and a pyramidal pantile roof. There are two storeys and a square plan. On the roof is a lead spirelet over louvred pigeon holes.	II
36 Church Street; 53.82951°N 0.11120°W		1789	The house is in red brick, and has a pantile roof with tumbled-in brick on the right gable. There are two storeys and an L-shaped plan, with a front of four bays. The doorway has a fanlight and above it is a datestone. The windows are sashes, and all the openings have wedge lintels.	II
Aldborough House; 53.82666°N 0.11490°W	—	c. 1840	The house is in grey brick, with stone dressings, a moulded floor band, and a hipped slate roof with overhanging eaves. There are two storeys and three bays. In the centre is a projecting porch with a dentilled cornice, a ramped blocking course, and a finial. The windows are sashes those on the ground floor projecting under low pediments. On the upper floor is a central French window flanked by sashes with wedge lintels.	II
