= Tanton =

Tanton is a surname. It may refer to the following people:

- James Tanton (born 1966), mathematician
- Janice Tanton (born 1961), Canadian artist
- John Tanton (1934–2019), United States immigration reduction activist
- Lindy Elkins-Tanton, American planetary scientist
- Miguel Tanton (born 1989), Filipino-American football player

== See also ==
- Tanton, a hamlet in North Yorkshire, England
