= Charles Templeton (disambiguation) =

Charles Templeton (1915–2001) was a Canadian author, politician, inventor and evangelist.

Charles Templeton may also refer to:

- Charles Templeton (cricketer) (1806–1834), English cricketer
- Charles A. Templeton (1871–1955), American politician and Governor of Connecticut
- Charles F. Templeton (1856–1913), Justice of the Dakota Territorial Supreme Court
- Chuck Templeton (baseball) (1932–1997), pitcher in Major League Baseball
- Chuck Templeton (born 1968), American Internet entrepreneur

== See also ==
- Templeton (disambiguation)
