= Rough Castle Fort =

Ruins of a Roman fort in Scotland

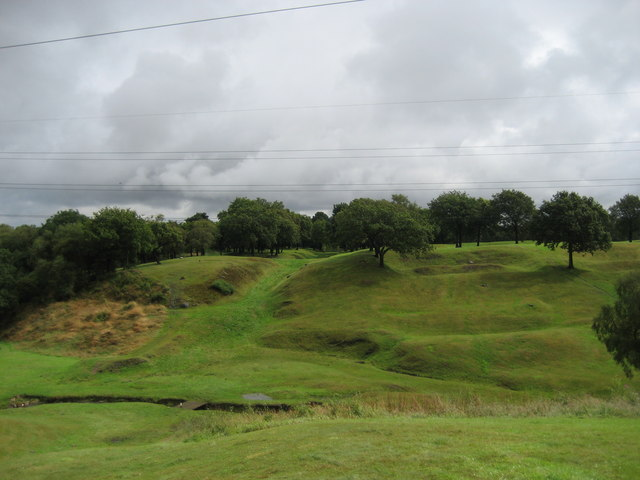

- Location within Scotland Central Belt Location within Scotland
- 55.997800°N 3.856000°W
- Location: Near Tamfourhill, Falkirk, Scotland

History
- Founded: 142 AD
- Built: Antoninus Pius

Site notes
- Condition: Ruined

Rough Castle Fort is a Roman fort on the Antonine Wall roughly 2 kilometres south east of Bonnybridge near Tamfourhill in the Falkirk council area, Scotland. It is owned by the National Trust for Scotland.

== Context ==
The Antonine Wall dates from about 143 AD. The ends of the wall were uncertain for many years. In the east Carriden near Bo'ness on the Forth was a likely endpoint. In the west is Old Kilpatrick on the Clyde, although there were also forts beyond that at Bishopton and Barochan Hill. The fort is one of the best-preserved of the forts constructed along the Wall. Built against the southern rear face of the Wall, the fort was defended by 6 metre thick turf ramparts and surrounded by defensive ditches. Gateways were provided through the main wall to the north, and also through the walls on the other three sides of the fort. Causeways were then constructed across the main Antonine and secondary defensive ditches, affording easy access to and from the fort.

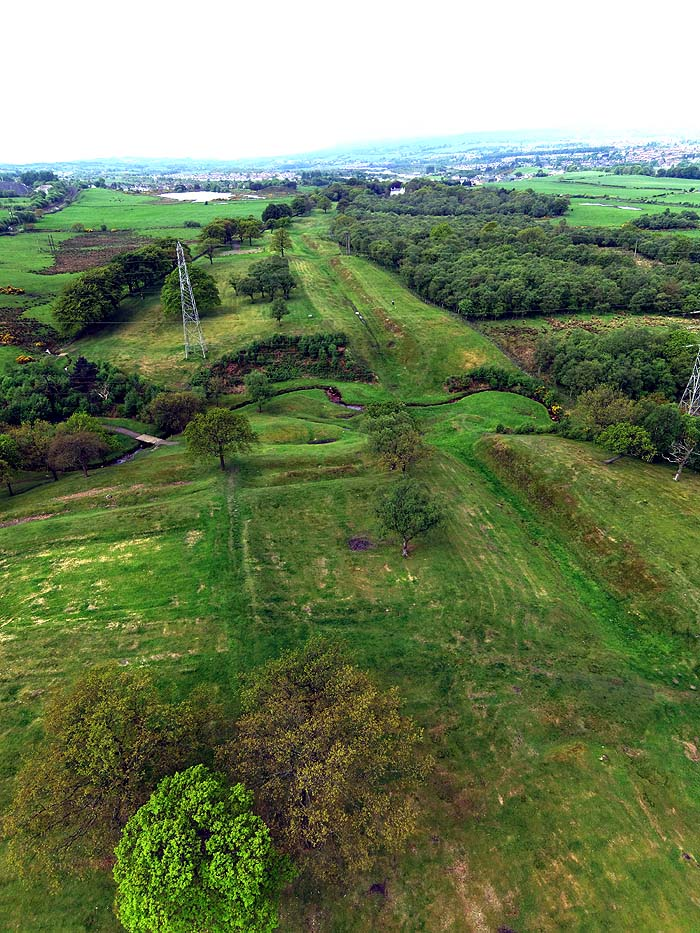
A view looking westwards over Rough Castle along the Antonine Wall.

The fort was the second smallest on the Wall and had an area of about 4,000 square metres. The fort contained several buildings, made of stone from a time when this was a less common construction material. The traces of the commander's house, the barracks, the headquarters, the bath house and a granary have been discovered. Although the original buildings have not survived, these buildings' foundations were discovered during excavations in 1902–03, 1932 and 1957–61.

== Finds ==
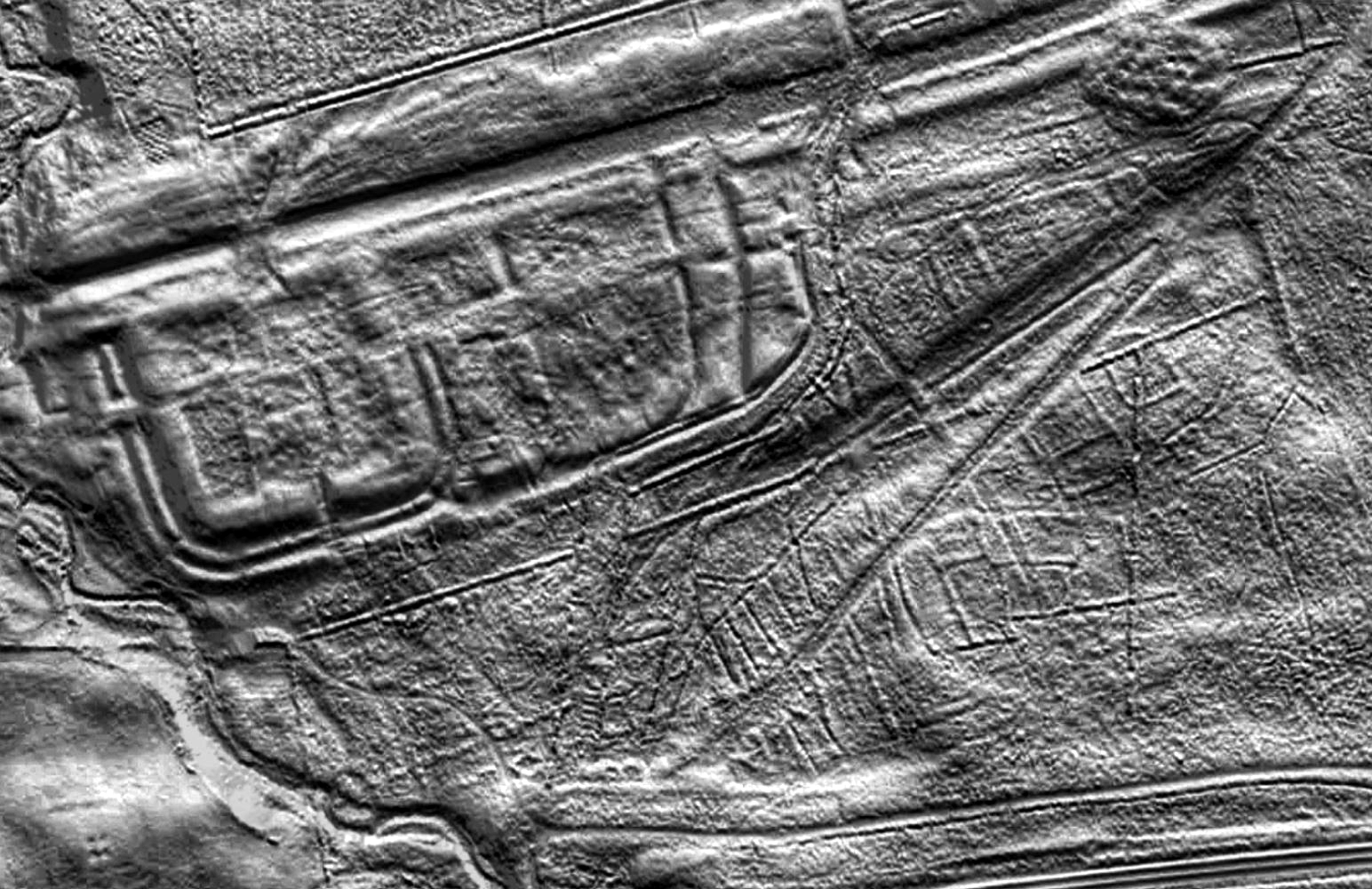
A lidar view of Rough Castle on the Antonine Wall

Inscriptions found on recovered artefacts indicate that the fort based 480 men of the Cohors VI Nerviorum of Nervii, foot soldiers drawn from a north-eastern Gallic tribe. The military road on the south side of the Wall, which enabled transport between all forts, is still well defined and there is also a fine length of rampart and ditch still intact to the west. An altar to Victory was found in 1843 to the south of the fort. Other finds include a bangle, some glass from a window and leather shoes.

A series of pits were discovered during the excavations lying to the north west of the causeway across the Antonine ditch. These pits, known as lilia, would originally have contained sharpened stakes at the bottom. They were positioned to help defend the vulnerable northern gateway through the wall. Near the fort were a turf platform (beacon platform or signalling platform) and gravel pits for building of the military road. The bath house was built on an annexe. The fort was defended by Nervii, and Flavius Betto was a commanding officer.

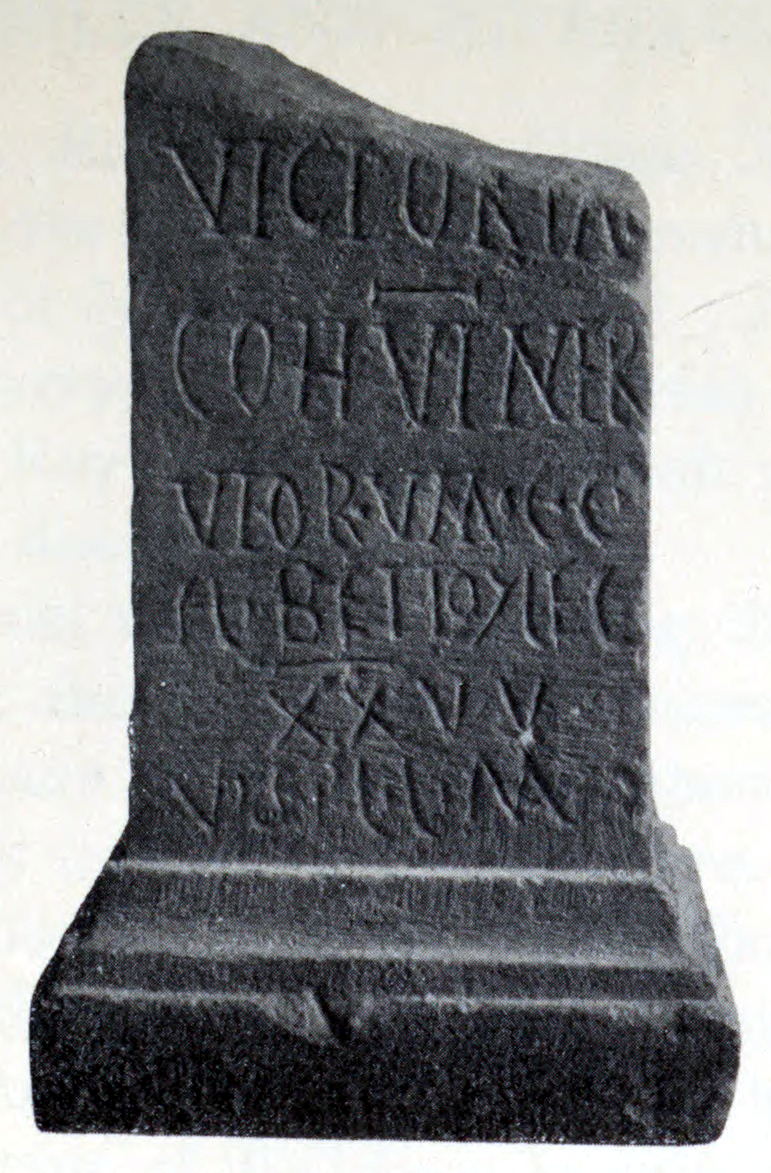
RIB 2144. Altar dedicated to Victory. George MacDonald calls it no. 34 in the 2nd edition of his book The Roman Wall in Scotland. It has been scanned and a video produced.

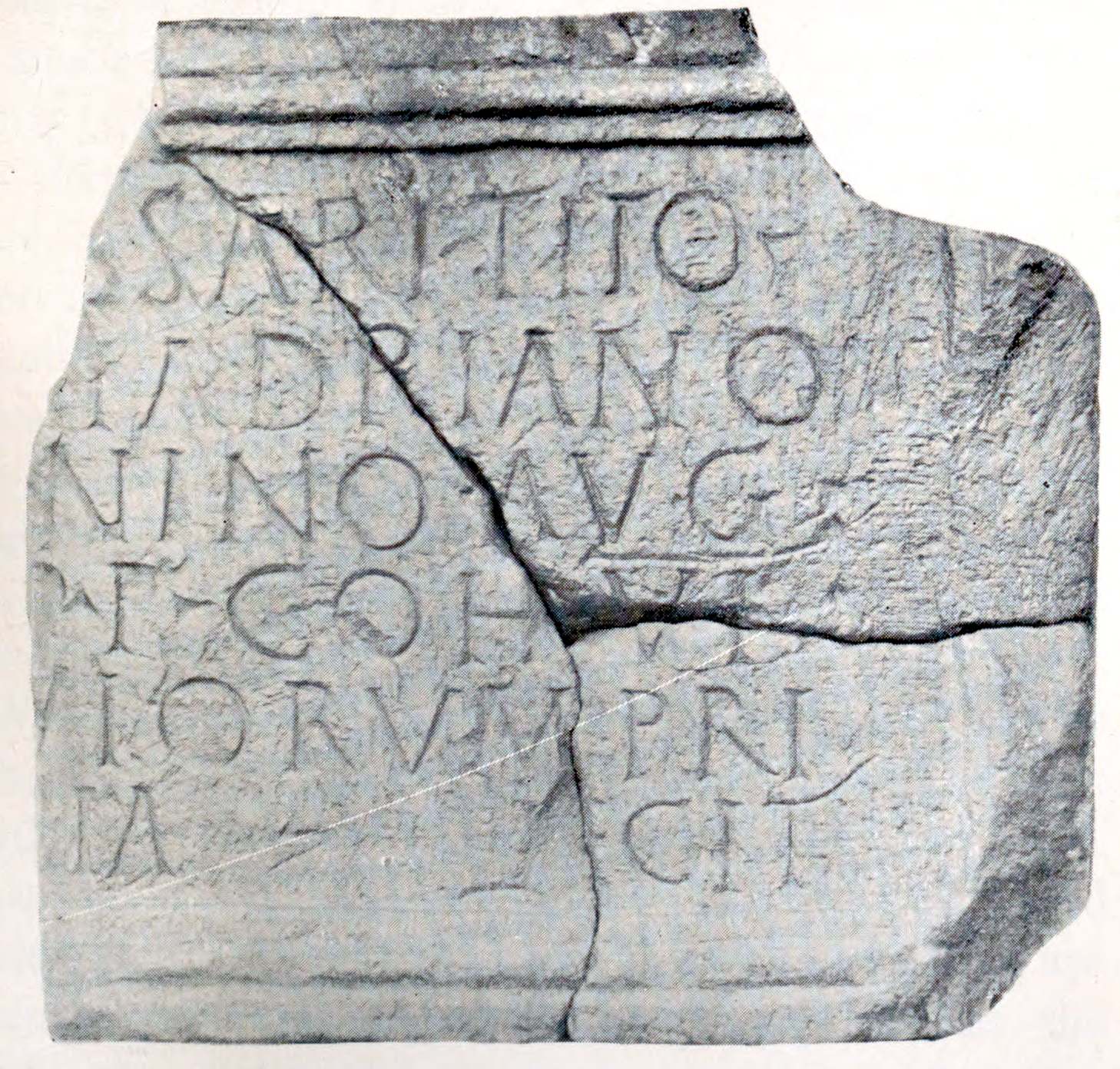
Tablet from Rough Castle's ‘Principia’ (headquarters). RIB 2145, dedicated to the emperor Antoninus Pius. George MacDonald calls it no. 29 in the 2nd edition of his book The Roman Wall in Scotland. It has been scanned and a video produced.

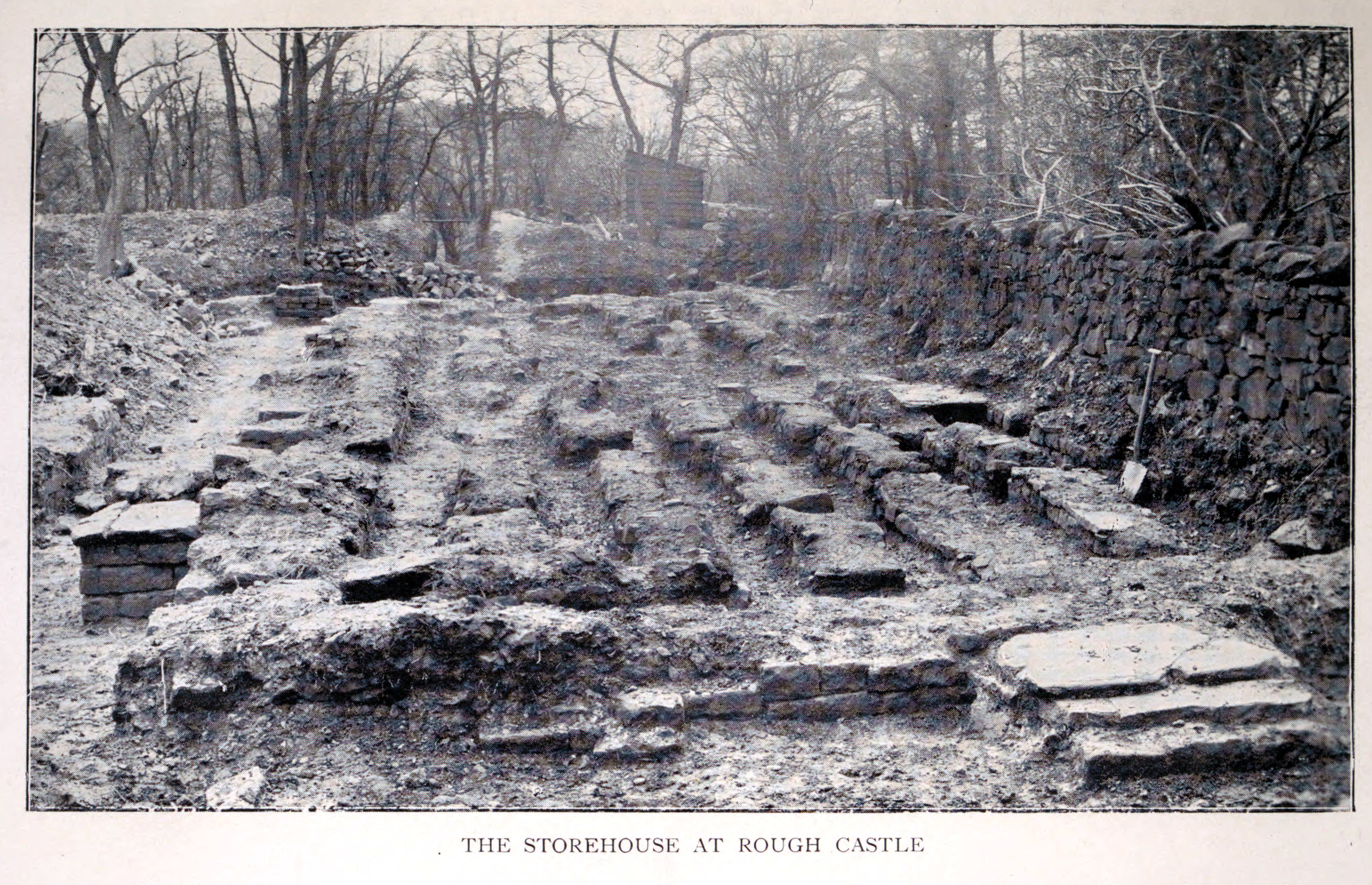
The Granary at Rough Castle Roman Fort, with its tell-tale buttresses at left, from The Roman Wall in Scotland

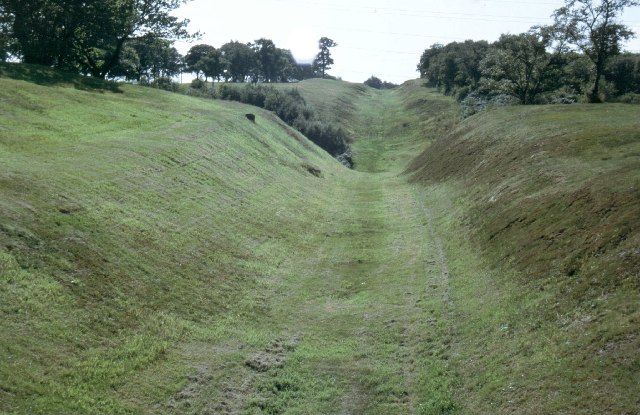
A section of the Antonine Wall just to the west of Rough Castle fort.

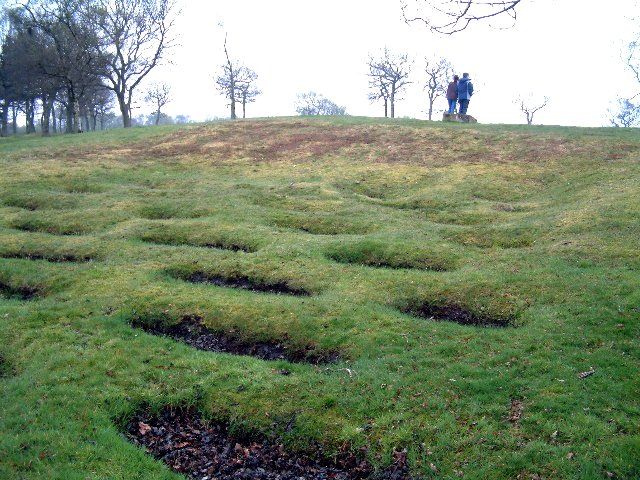
The lilia (defensive pits) north west of the fort (recently re-excavated)

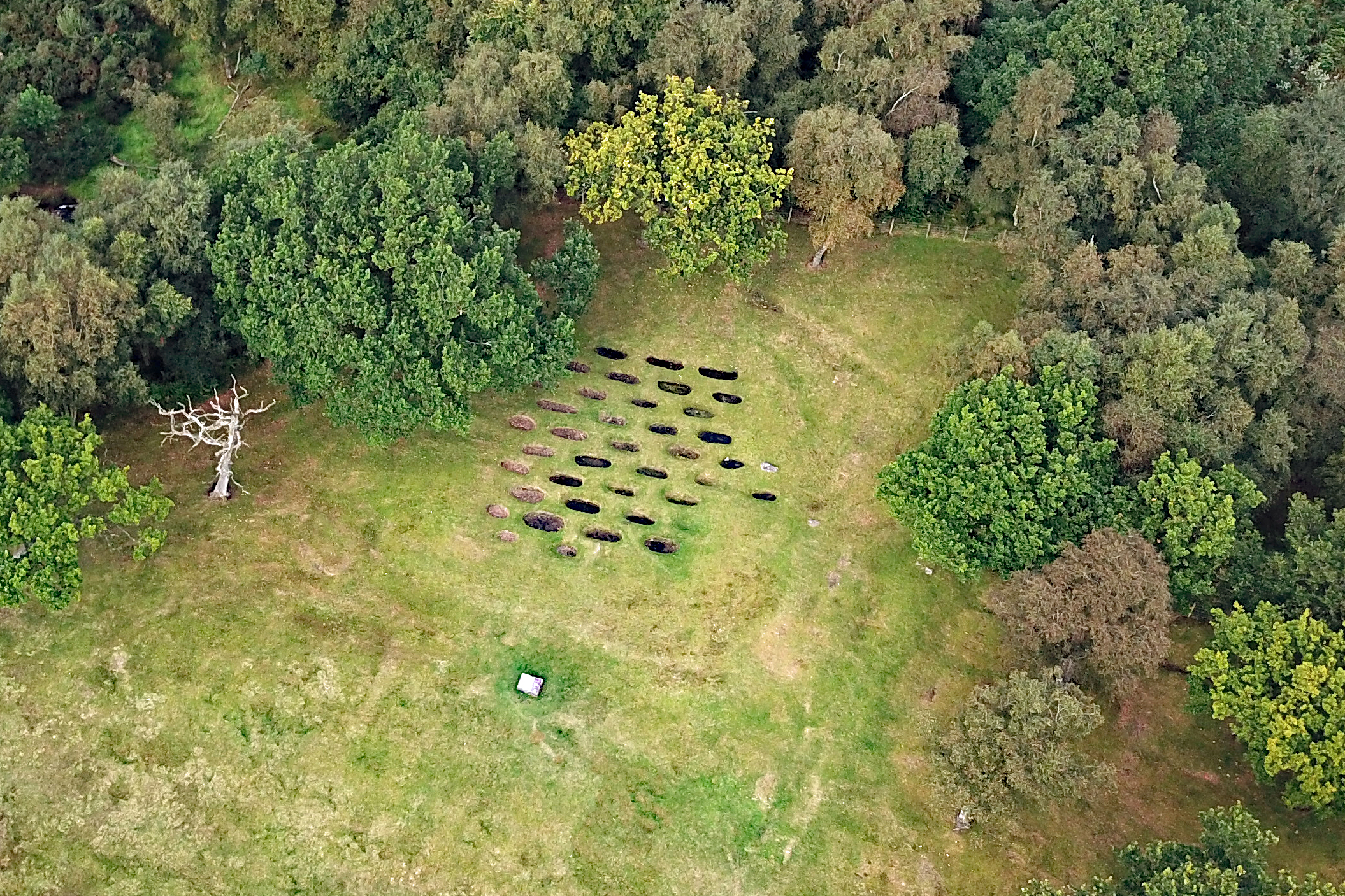
Lilia from the air

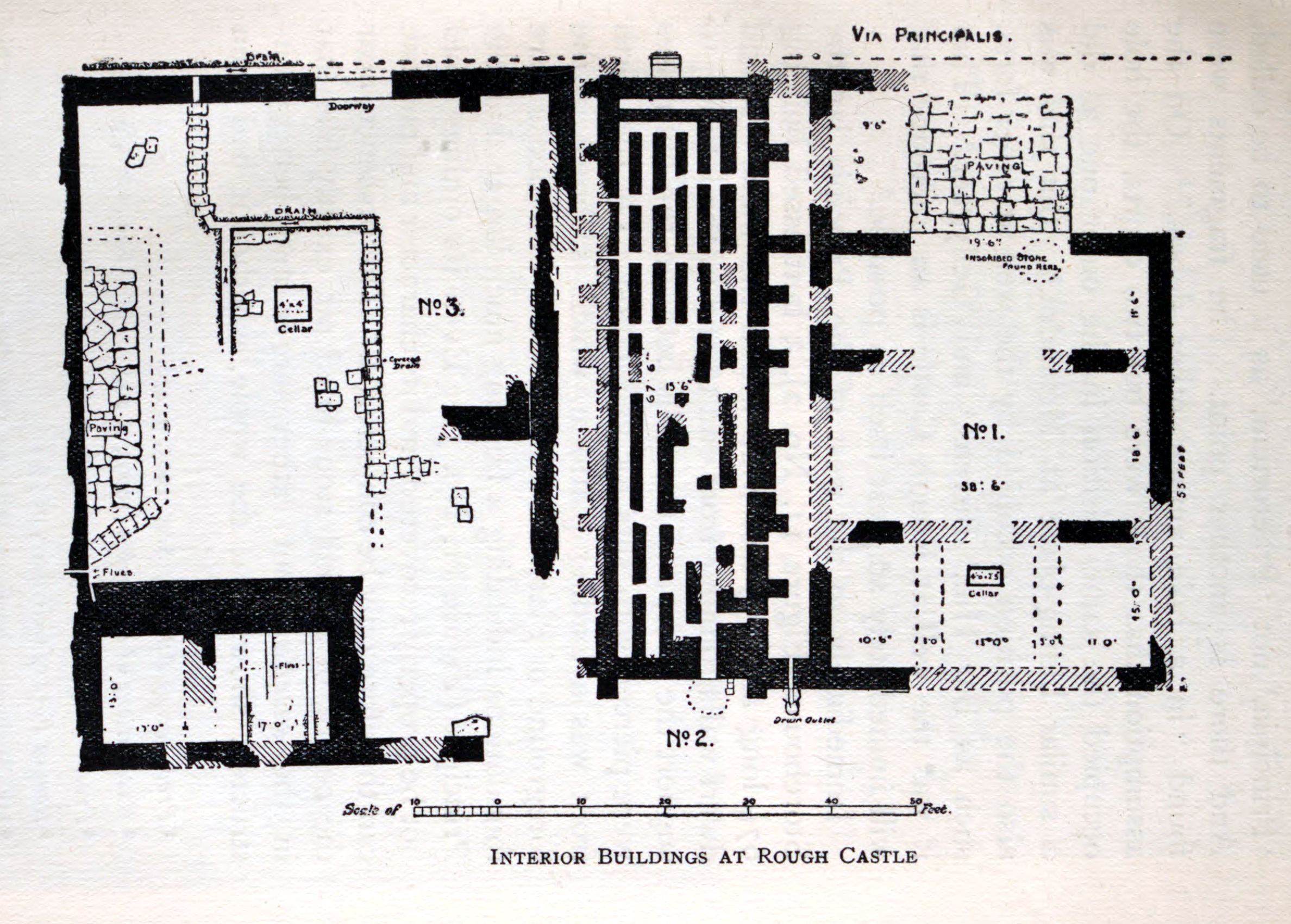
Plan of Rough Castle Fort interior. George MacDonald shows other drawings in the 2nd edition of his book The Roman Wall in Scotland.

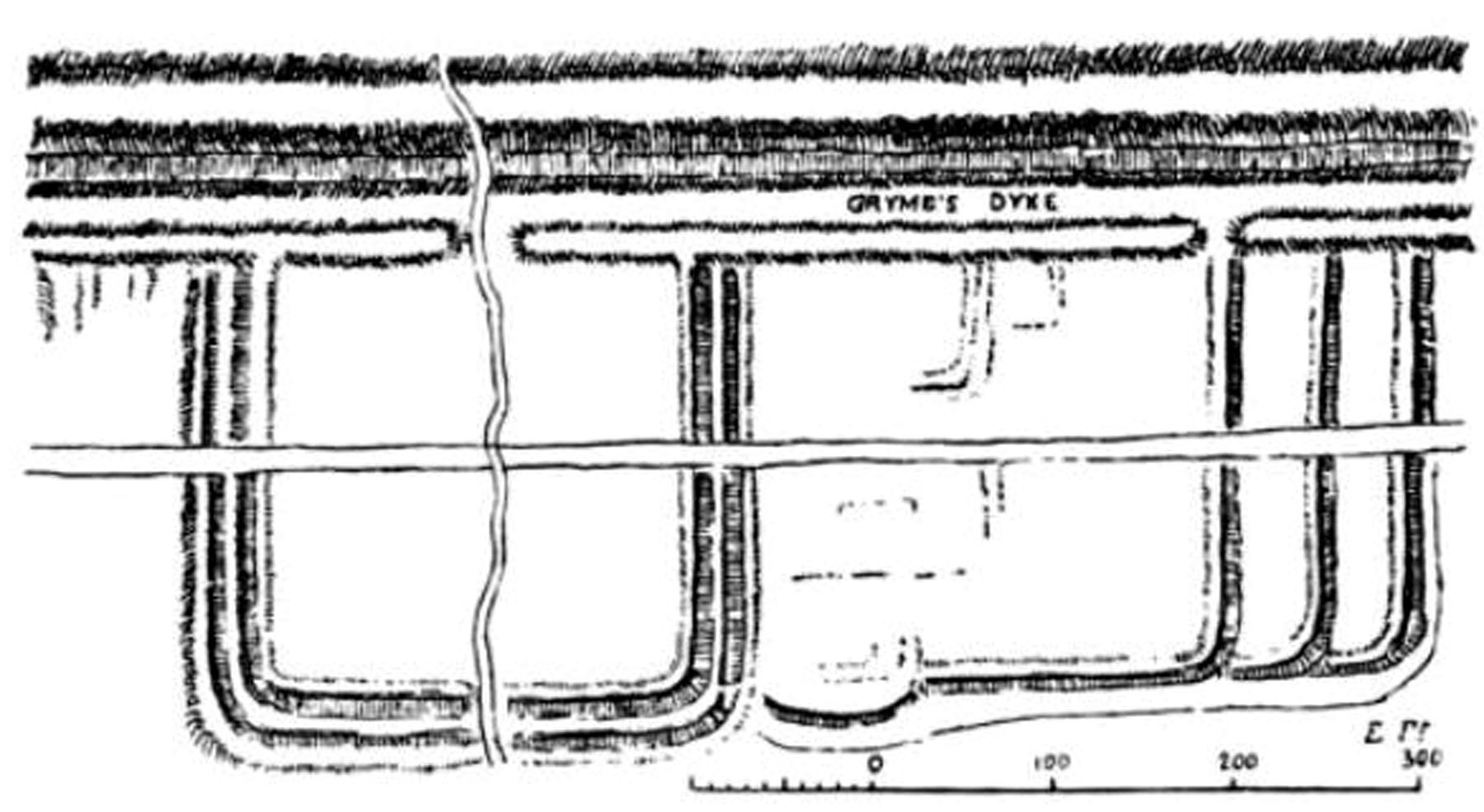
Rough Castle on the Antonine Wall, drawn by William Roy in 1755

One of the best overviews of the site is the video of the Bridgeness Slab by Falkirk Council, presented by Geoff Bailey, Keeper of Archeology and Local History at Falkirk Museum, from about 10 minutes. For early discoveries see Sir George Macdonald's writings.

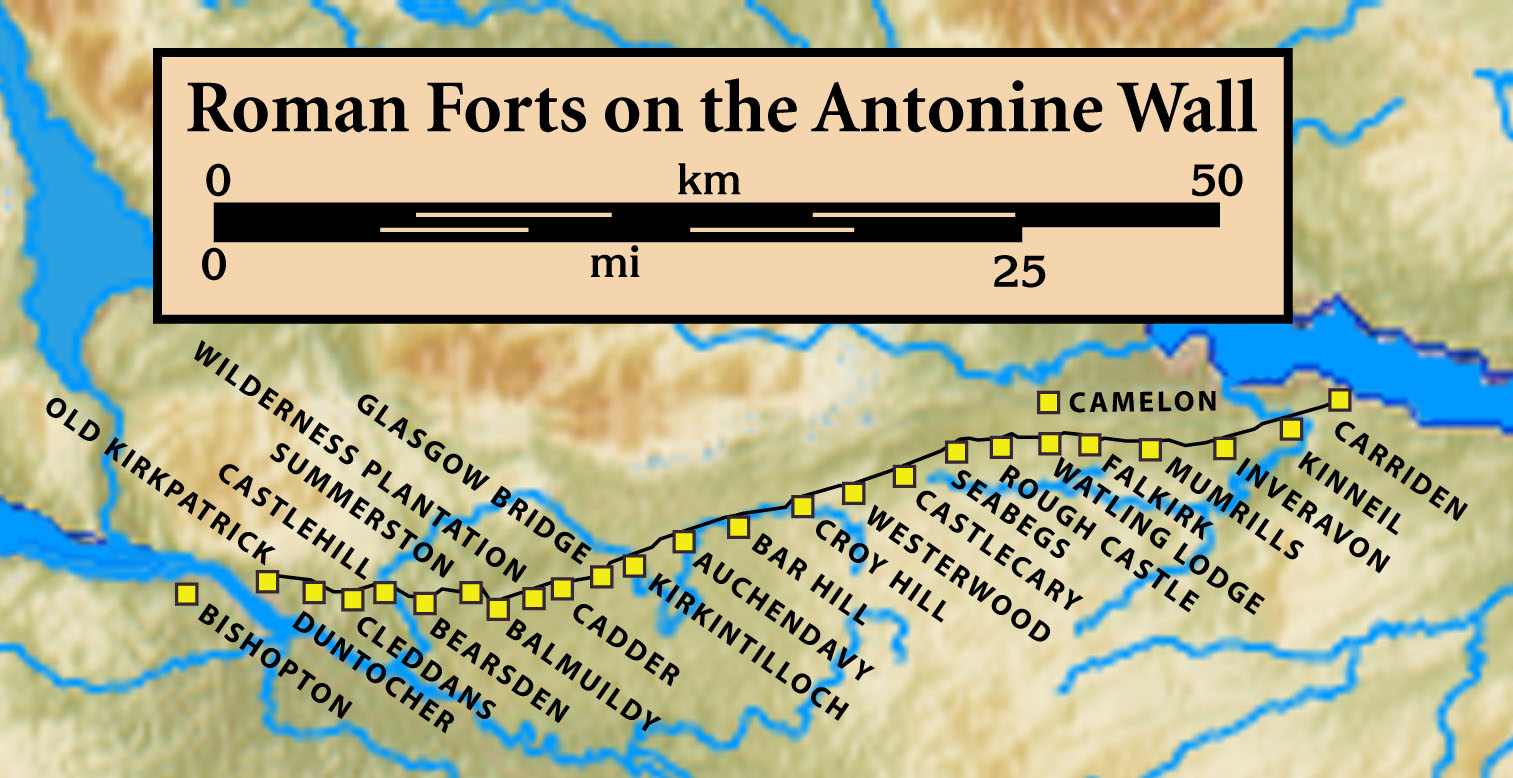
Forts and Fortlets associated with the Antonine Wall from west to east: Bishopton, Old Kilpatrick, Duntocher, Cleddans, Castlehill, Bearsden, Summerston, Balmuildy, Wilderness Plantation, Cadder, Glasgow Bridge, Kirkintilloch, Auchendavy, Bar Hill, Croy Hill, Westerwood, Castlecary, Seabegs, Rough Castle, Camelon, Watling Lodge, Falkirk, Mumrills, Inveravon, Kinneil, Carriden

== Events ==
A sound and light show was organised at Rough Castle in November 2018 to promote tourism.

== See also ==
- List of places in Falkirk district
