= Etherdwick =

Hamlet in the East Riding of Yorkshire, England

Coordinates: 53.816568°N 0.129325°W

- Location within the East Riding of Yorkshire
- OS grid reference: TA232372
  - London: 160 mi (260 km) S
- Civil parish: Aldbrough
- Unitary authority: East Riding of Yorkshire
- Ceremonial county: East Riding of Yorkshire
- Region: Yorkshire and the Humber
- Country: England
- Sovereign state: United Kingdom
- Post town: HULL
- Postcode district: HU11
- Dialling code: 01964
- Police: Humberside
- Fire: Humberside
- Ambulance: Yorkshire
- UK Parliament: Beverley and Holderness

Etherdwick is a hamlet in the East Riding of Yorkshire, England in an area known as Holderness. It is approximately 9 miles (14 km) north-west of Withernsea town centre. It lies 1.5 miles (2.4 km) to the west of the B1242 road.

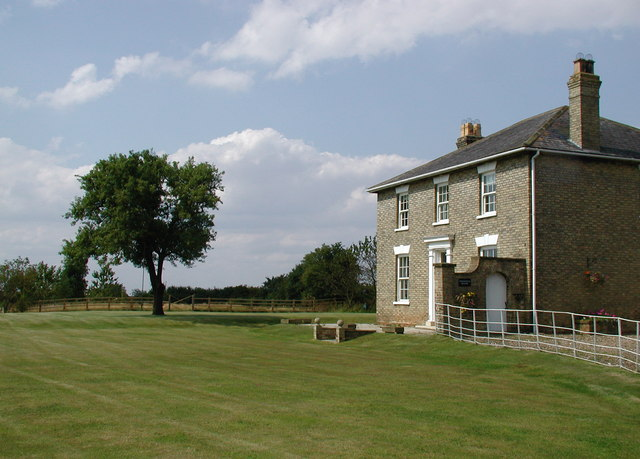
Etherdwick Grange

The hamlet forms part of the civil parish of Aldbrough.

In 1823 Bulmer's Topography, History and Directory of East Yorkshire wrote Etherdwick's name as "Etherdwicke". At the time it was in the Wapentake and Liberty of Holderness. Recorded in the hamlet were three farmers.
