= Low Fell (Lake District) =

Mountain in Cumbria, England

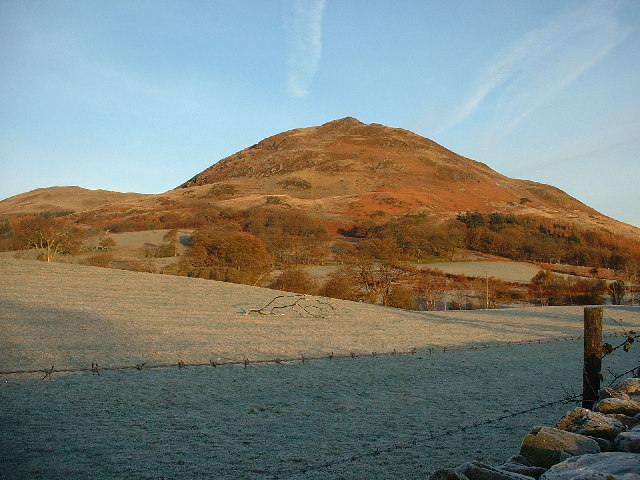
- Low Fell from Thackthwaite

Highest point
- Elevation: 423 m (1,388 ft)
- Prominence: c. 270 m
- Parent peak: High Stile
- Listing: Wainwright, Marilyn
- Coordinates: 54°35′28″N 3°20′13″W

Geography
- Location within the Lake District Location within the former Allerdale Borough
- Location: Cumbria, England
- Parent range: Lake District, Western Fells
- OS grid: NY137226
- Topo map: OS Landranger 89, Explorer OL4

Low Fell is a fell in the English Lake District. It overlooks the lake of Loweswater to the south and to the north is bordered by its neighbour Fellbarrow. It is usually climbed from the villages of Loweswater or Thackthwaite. The fell is largely occupied by grassed enclosures, although there are some rocky outcrops near the top. Low Fell has fairly steep slopes to the south and east.

== Topography ==
The Western Fells occupy a triangular sector of the Lake District, bordered by the River Cocker to the north east and Wasdale to the south east. Westwards, the hills diminish towards the coastal plain of Cumberland. At the central hub of the high country are Great Gable and its satellites, while two principal ridges fan out on either flank of Ennerdale, the western fells in effect being a great horseshoe around this long wild valley. Low Fell and Fellbarrow stand remote from the end of the northern arm.

Loweswater is unique amongst the major lakes of the District in emptying towards the centre of the National Park. Its waters flow out eastwards into Crummock Water before beginning their northward journey as the Cocker. Loweswater does not therefore represent any watershed between the fells on either side of its valley, as might be supposed from a quick glance at the map. A low ridge circuiting the western end of the lake joins Burnbank Fell to Low Fell and Fellbarrow, confirming them as the last outpost of the Western Fells.

Low Fell and Fellbarrow form a ridge two miles long, with the somewhat contrarily named Low Fell being the higher. Alfred Wainwright in his influential Pictorial Guide to the Lakeland Fells was forced to estimate the elevation of Low Fell and considered it (albeit doubtfully) to be inferior to Fellbarrow. New mapping by the Ordnance Survey has now settled the issue. The lowest col on the ridge occurs immediately south of Fellbarrow, and the intervening tops are therefore usually considered satellites of Low Fell. These lower summits, working southward, are Smithy Fell (1,296 ft) and Sourfoot Fell (1,350 ft).

The southern terminus of the ridge, looking down on Loweswater village, is rough on all sides, rising to a small neat top. This was considered the summit by Wainwright, although again he was unsure and ill-served by the maps of the time. Birkett refers to this 1,352 ft top as Loweswater Fell, although without any particular justification. North of this point is a slight depression before the smoother and more elongated true summit.

A subsidiary ridge breaks off south-west from Sourfoot Fell, crossing the slight hump of Loftbarrow before reaching Darling Fell (1,282 ft). This stands over the northern shore of Loweswater, about halfway up the lake. Between Darling Fell and Low Fell is the little valley of Crabtree Beck. In general, the western slopes of the Low Fell ridge are long and gentle, while some rock appears along the steeper eastern and southern flanks.

The western boundary of the fell proper lies at Leady Moss, the low point on the connecting ridge to Burnbank Fell. From here, the Dub Beck flows into Loweswater while the Black Beck flows north-west into the River Marron. The open fellside is circumscribed by a minor road which runs from the shore of Loweswater north to Mosser. In the east, the slopes fall quickly to the cultivated lands of the broad Vale of Lorton. Raven Crag below the summit and Watching Crag on Sourfoot Fell are the main features.

== Geology ==
The rocks beneath the summit are of the Loweswater Formation, composed of greywacke sandstone turbidities. Beneath this and occasionally outcropping on the eastern flanks are the laminated mudstone and siltstone of the Kirk Stile Formation.

== Summit ==
Wainwright described the view from the lower southern top, noting that two cairns lower down the southern face gave better vantage points for the Loweswater Valley. From either summit, there are views to Grasmoor, across the Lorton Vale and down the Buttermere valley in which you can see Crummock Water and Buttermere.

Both tops are marked by cairns; the true summit top being on a small outcrop amid short fell grass and large rocks.

== Ascents ==
The gentlest way onto the ridge is from Thackthwaite in the Vale of Lorton. A footpath leads away from the settlement climbing to the intake wall. Beyond is a drove road, curving up the hillside to emerge at the top of Sourfoot Fell. The ridge from here is easy. An alternative start is from the Mosser road, climbing Darling Fell before joining the main ridge. Wainwright also suggests following Crabtree Beck for a direct ascent of Low Fell.

== Ownership ==
Land Registry records show that Low Fell, Raven Crag and surrounding lands that formed part of Oak Farm were in the ownership of the Master and Scholars of Balliol College in the University of Oxford. The title changing hands to John Gladstone Mitchel of Cockermouth in 1959. Low Fell and Raven Crag are now in the ownership of Buy Land Plant Trees CIC, a subsidiary of Chimney Sheep Ltd.

== Nature Reserve ==
In 2020/21 a large portion of the Fell was acquired by Buy Land Plant Trees CIC to 'hand it back to nature'. The previously dilapidated fencing has been replaced and sheep access prevented creating a nature reserve. Planting of scrub (hawthorn, birch, blackthorn, rowan, etc) started in 2021/22 with the eventual aim of creating a mosaic landscape of scrub/trees and open areas of moorland and peat bog.

== Change to land management ==
Since the acquisition of the fell by Buy Land Plant Trees CIC all sheep have been excluded to allow natural regeneration of grazing inhibited plant species. To further protect the regeneration of the site and ensure nature is the main beneficiary all access by fox hounds and hunters (including trail hunting) is prohibited.
