= East Newton =

Hamlet in the East Riding of Yorkshire, England

Coordinates: 53.822360°N 0.077790°W

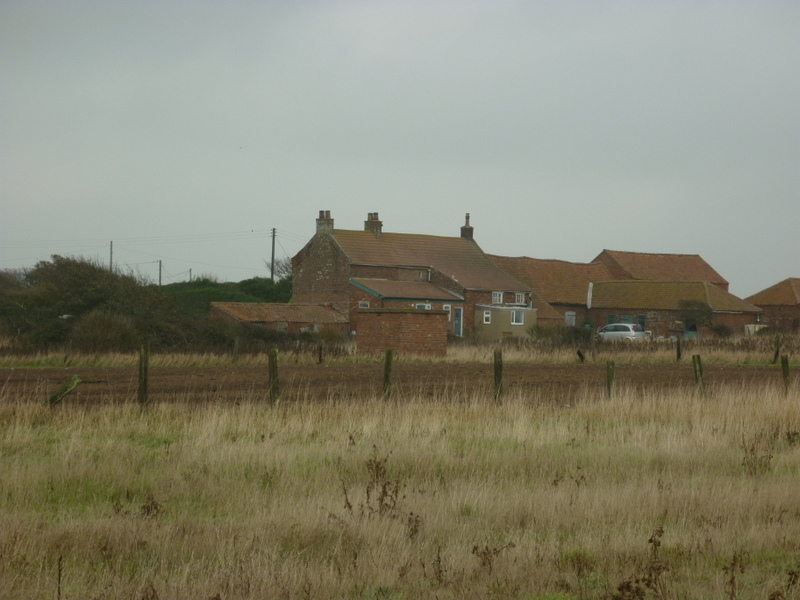

- Location within the East Riding of Yorkshire
- OS grid reference: TA266379
  - London: 160 mi (260 km) S
- Civil parish: Aldbrough
- Unitary authority: East Riding of Yorkshire
- Ceremonial county: East Riding of Yorkshire
- Region: Yorkshire and the Humber
- Country: England
- Sovereign state: United Kingdom
- Post town: HULL
- Postcode district: HU11
- Dialling code: 01964
- Police: Humberside
- Fire: Humberside
- Ambulance: Yorkshire
- UK Parliament: Beverley and Holderness

East Newton is a hamlet in the civil parish of Aldbrough, in the East Riding of Yorkshire, England, in an area known as Holderness. It is situated approximately 8 miles (13 km) north-west of Withernsea town centre. It lies to the east of the B1242 road on the North Sea coast.

East Newton was formerly a township in the parish of Aldbrough, in 1866 East Newton became a civil parish, on 1 April 1935 the parish was abolished and merged with Aldbrough. In 1931 the parish had a population of 25.

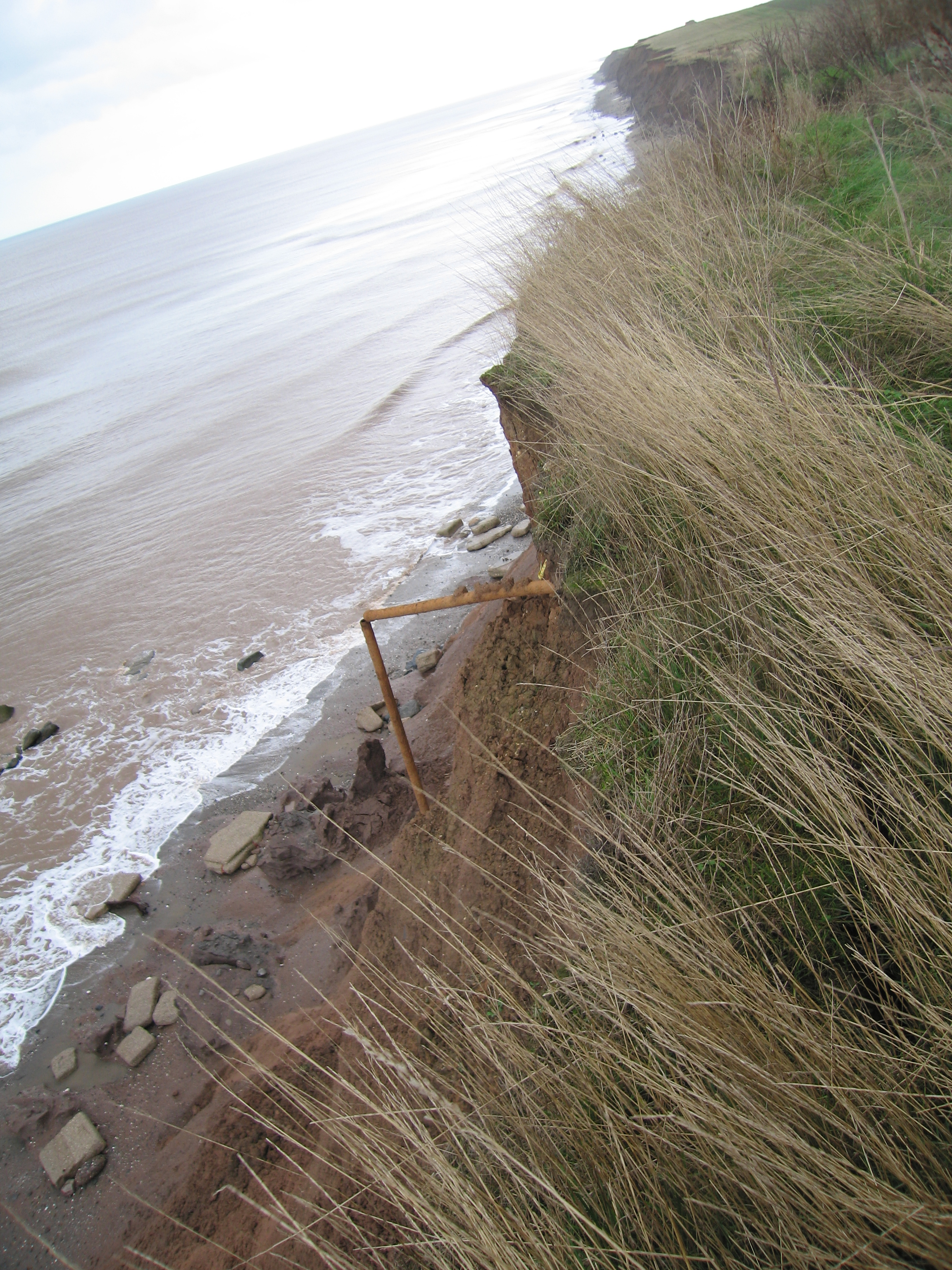
The cliff at East Newton
