= St Bartholomew's Church, Aldbrough =

Church in Aldbrough, East Riding of Yorkshire, England

Coordinates: 53°49′47.28″N 0°6′40.00″W

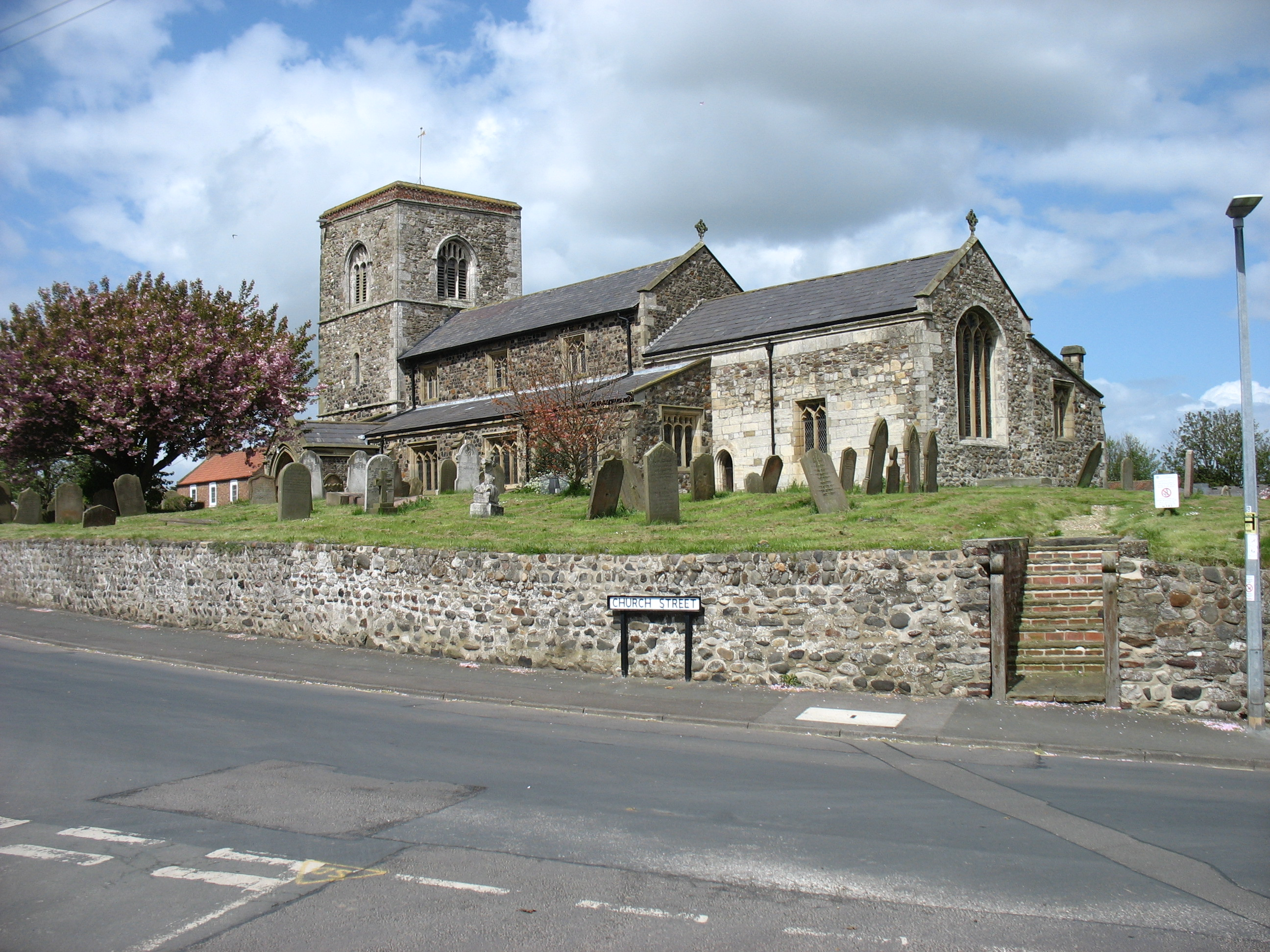
The church, in 2018

St Bartholomew's Church is the parish church of Aldbrough, East Riding of Yorkshire, a village in England.

The church was built in the 11th century, from which period parts of the nave survive, including some windows. The chancel and aisles to the nave were added in the 12th century, and the tower in the early 13th century. The nave was largely rebuilt from 1870 to 1871, then the tower was restored in 1908 by Temple Moore. The building was grade II* listed in 1966.

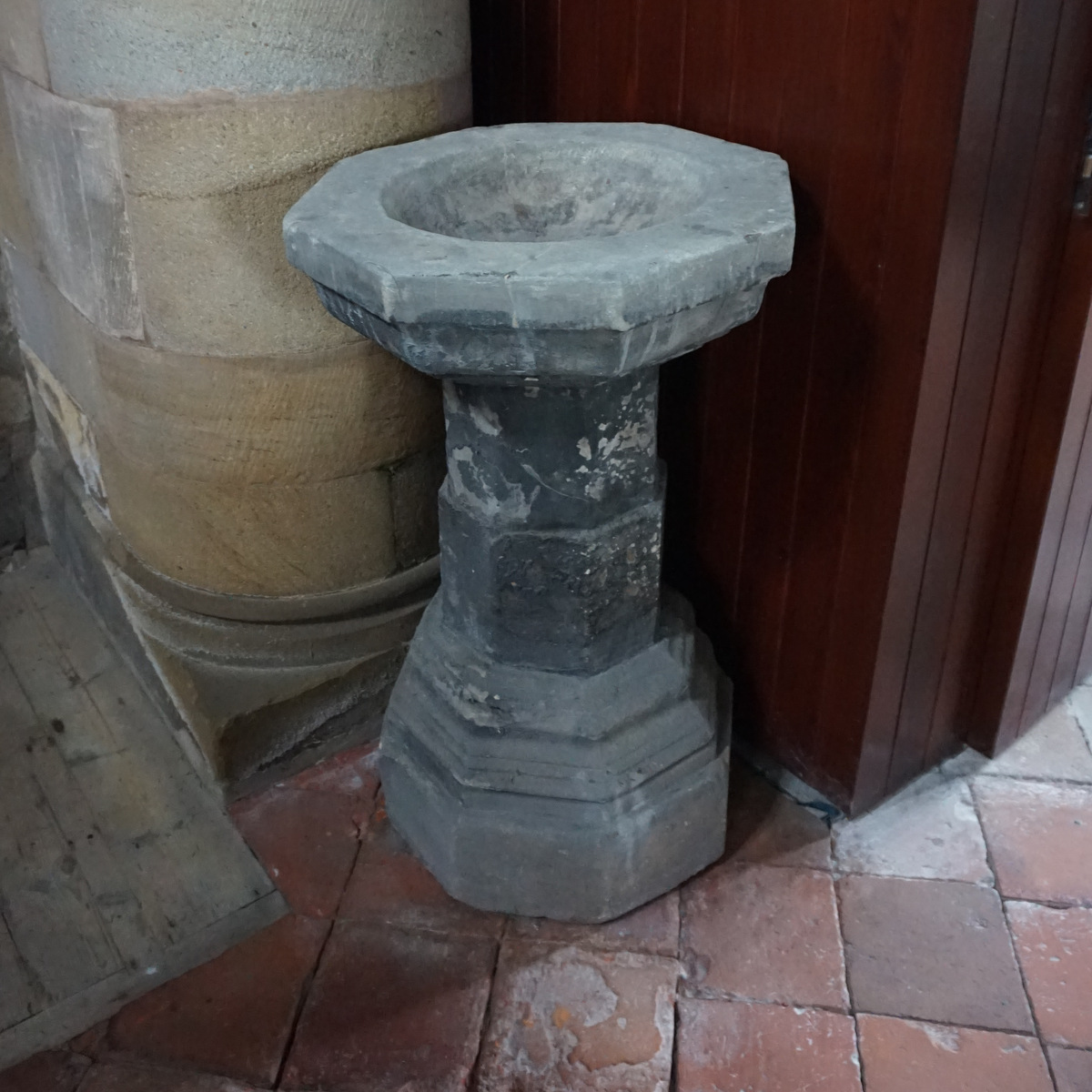
15th-century font

The church is built of coursed cobbles with a slate roof, and consists of a nave with a clerestory, north and south aisles, a south porch, a chancel with a north chapel, and a west tower. The tower has three stages, a moulded plinth, angle buttresses, quoins, moulded string courses, a two-light west window, lancet windows on the lower stages, bell openings with two or three lights, a west clock face, and a dentilled brick parapet. The south wall of the chancel has a priest's door, and contains an early carved stone. Inside, there is an 11th-century sundial inscribed to "Ulf who ordered this church to be built for his own and Gunware's souls". There is also a sculpture sometimes said to depict a Roman soldier, which may be 12th century; the chest tomb of John de Mulsa, who died in 1377; an effigy of a women, also late 14th century; and a 15th-century font on an octagonal pillar, which is said to have come from St Hilda's Church, Cowden Parva, which is now under the sea.

== See also ==
- Grade II* listed buildings in the East Riding of Yorkshire
- Listed buildings in Aldbrough, East Riding of Yorkshire
