= Fellbarrow =

Hill in Cumbria, England

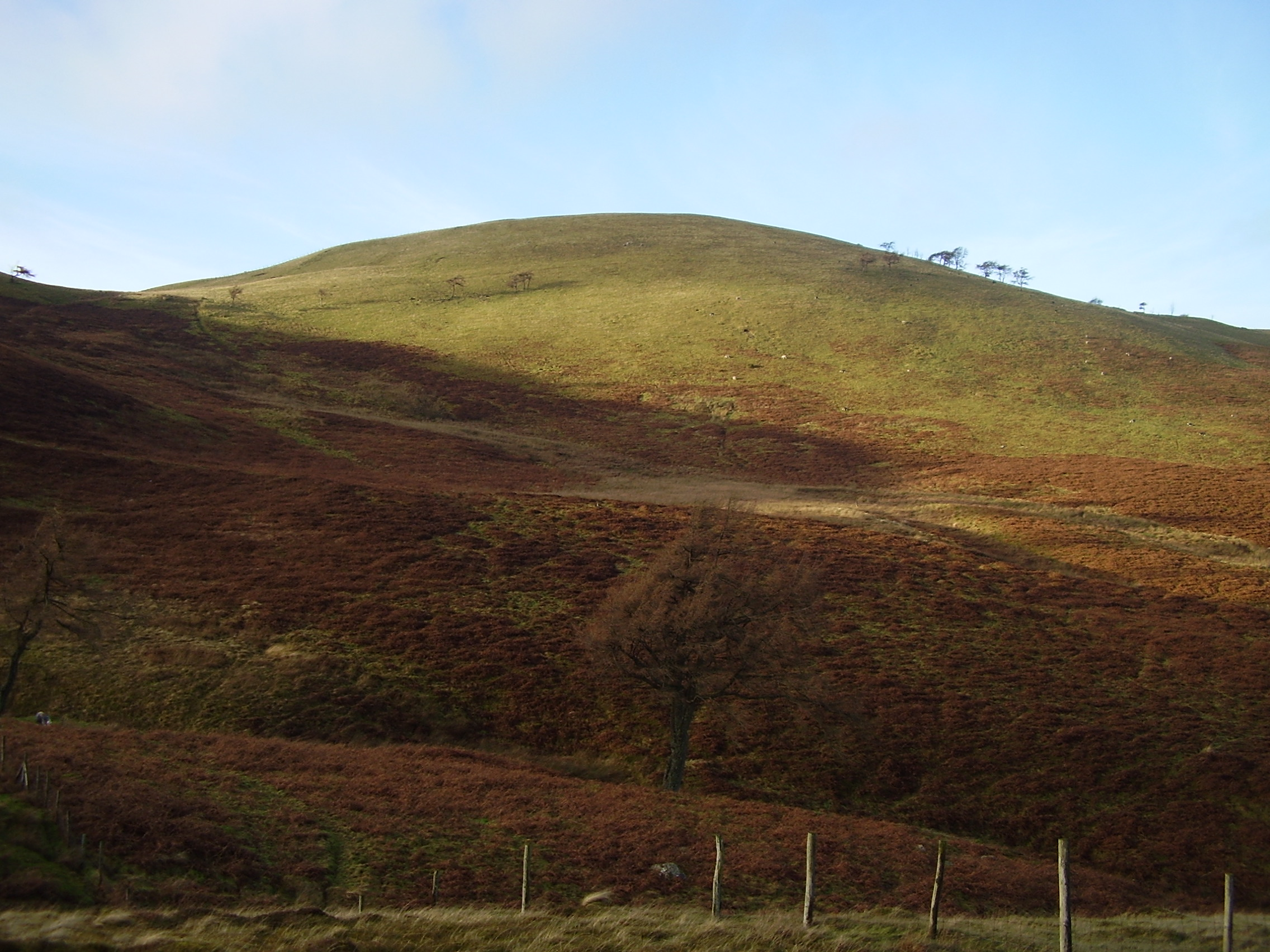
- Fellbarrow from the slopes of Low Fell

Highest point
- Elevation: 416 m (1,365 ft)
- Prominence: c. 50 m
- Parent peak: Low Fell
- Listing: Wainwright
- Coordinates: 54°36′18″N 3°20′31″W

Geography
- Location within the Lake District Location within the former Allerdale Borough
- Location: Cumbria, England
- Parent range: Lake District, Western Fells
- OS grid: NY132243
- Topo map: OS Landranger 89, 90, Explorer OL4

Fellbarrow is a low hill in the north west of the English Lake District. It is not far from the town of Cockermouth, near to Loweswater and can most easily be climbed from Low Lorton or Thackthwaite. From the summit there are views across the Lorton valley to Grasmoor and Whiteside.

== Topography ==
The Western Fells occupy a triangular sector of the Lake District, bordered by the River Cocker to the north east and Wasdale to the south east. Westwards the hills diminish toward the coastal plain of Cumberland. At the central hub of the high country are Great Gable and its satellites, while two principal ridges fan out on either flank of Ennerdale, the western fells in effect being a great horseshoe around this long wild valley. Fellbarrow and Low Fell stand remote from the end of the northern arm.

Loweswater is unique amongst the major lakes of the District in emptying toward the centre of the National Park. Its waters flow out eastwards into Crummock Water before beginning their northward journey as the Cocker. Loweswater does not therefore represent any watershed between the fells on either side of its valley, as might be supposed from a quick glance at the map. A low ridge circuiting the western end of the lake joins Burnbank Fell to Low Fell and Fellbarrow, confirming them as the last outpost of the Western Fells.

The two fells form a ridge 2 miles long with the lower Fellbarrow at the northern end. Alfred Wainwright in his influential Pictorial Guide to the Lakeland Fells was forced to estimate the elevation of Low Fell and considered (although with some doubts) Fellbarrow to be the high point of the ridge. There are a number of intervening tops, in particular Smithy Fell and Sourfoot Fell, which Wainwright decided were satellites of Low Fell, based on the position of the lowest col. That convention is followed here.

To the east of Fellbarrow is the Vale of Lorton, through which flows the River Cocker. This is a wide cultivated valley with a number of small parcels of woodland, the settlement of Thackthwaite lying nearest to the fell. To the west are a number of small streams including Mosser Beck and Cat Gill, which also flow northward and ultimately join the Cocker. This is rolling agricultural land on the very edge of the Lake District. North of Fellbarrow is the lower top of Hatteringill Head (1,263 ft), listed in some guidebooks before the ridge falls away over Whin Fell to a minor road known as Mirk Lane. Fellbarrow also sends out a short ridge north eastward over Broadmoor Hill towards Low Lorton village. The fell is rounded and grassy almost throughout.

== Geology ==
The rocks beneath the summit are of the Loweswater Formation, composed of greywacke sandstone turbidities. Beneath this and occasionally outcropping on the eastern flanks are the laminated mudstone and siltstone of the Kirk Stile Formation.

== Summit ==
The summit is a gently curving grassy dome, crossed by a fence, and sports an Ordnance Survey triangulation column and a cairn. To west and north are the Irish Sea and Solway Firth, seen across the Cumberland plain. To the east is a fine view of the North Western Fells across Lorton- the Whiteside - Grisedale Pike ridge perhaps the highlight- with Skiddaw and Blencathra popping up behind. Further round the view is crowded with fells, the northern wall of Ennerdale seen side on throughout its length and backed by Pillar and the Scafells. No lakes or tarns can be seen.

== Ascents ==
From Low Lorton village a lane leads westwards, joining to the access track to Hatteringill farm. This gives access to the north east ridge above Broadmoor Hill, within easy reach of the summit. An alternative is to climb Low Fell via the drove road from Thackthwaite, either branching north at the ridge or climbing both tops. From the west there are no rights of way on the fell, although it is marked by OS as access land. An approach from the Mosser road is therefore a possibility.
