= Aldbrough gas storage =

Gas storage plant in Yorkshire, England

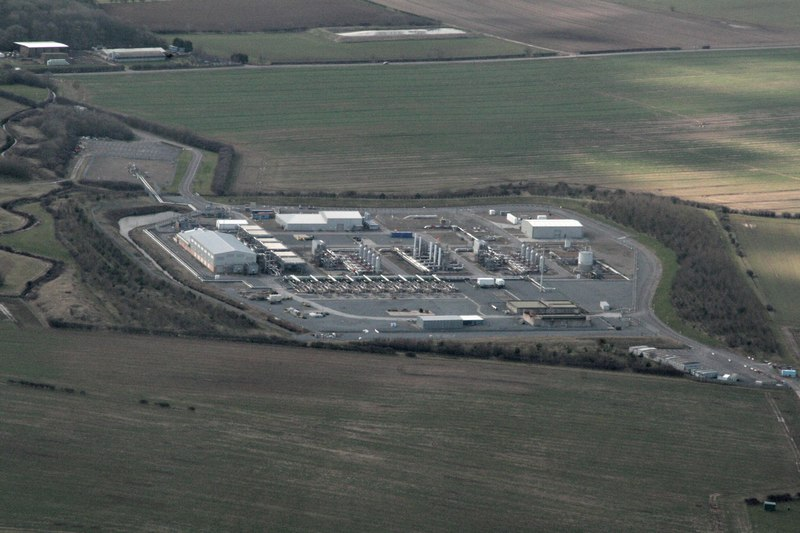
- Aldbrough gas storage site

General information
- Status: Completed
- Location: Aldbrough, East Riding of Yorkshire, England
- Coordinates: 53.813°N 0.087°W
- Elevation: 13 metres (43 ft) AOD (surface buildings)
- Current tenants: SSE & Equinor
- Construction started: March 2004
- Opened: July 2009

Aldbrough gas storage is a natural gas storage facility near to the village of Aldbrough in the East Riding of Yorkshire, England. The site has been operating since 2009, storing natural gas in nine underground salt caverns, each one big enough to contain the entire St Paul's Cathedral building. Plans have been forwarded for approval to allow the site to split hydrogen from water, store the hydrogen on site, and then pipe the hydrogen to the Humber cluster of industrial concerns in a net-zero electricity generating plan.

== History ==
Development of the site for gas storage was first mooted in 1992 by British Gas (North Aldbrough) and Intergen (South Aldbrough), then later again in 1997 at a proposed cost of £70 million, but by 2003, the two sites were under development by SSE and Statoil. The storage caverns, which are 100 metres (330 ft) tall by 100 metres (330 ft) wide, are located in the Permian salt deposits between 1,700 metres (5,600 ft) and 1,800 metres (5,900 ft) below the surface, and the site lies some 2.5 kilometres (1.6 mi) south-east of Aldbrough village. The storage sites were created to ensure a security of supply of gas into the UK market and as a buffer if gas import terminals were to go offline. Caverns carved out of salt deposits are "ideally suited for the creation of storage cavities for gas and certain fluids. The waste extracted salt was simply washed into the sea, but other salt caverns used to store gas in the UK (such as in Teesside, Cheshire and Lancashire) were as a result of solution mining the salt for chemical processes and using the voids left behind. The caverns at Aldbrough (and nearby Atwick) in the East Riding of Yorkshire, were specifically created to store gas.

By 2007, the facility was Britain's largest onshore storage site for natural gas and by 2010, the three SSE caverns could store 100,000,000 cubic metres (3.5×10^{9} cu ft) of gas, and the company opened a fourth cavern that same year. This represented a gas source capable of generating 8,800 gwh of electricity annually. The site reached completion in 2011, and has the capacity to store 276,000,000 cubic metres (9.7×10^{9} cu ft) of gas. In 2017 Centrica closed their gas storage facility under the North Sea (Rough), since then, the Aldbrough site represents the largest gas storage facility on the eastern coast of England, having between 17–19% of Britain's gas storage capacity (variable due to the capacity and storage volumes at other sites). (Note: In 2023, the following locations were storing gas for supply into the UK gas network when peak demand outstripped normal supply: Stublach (23%), Aldbrough (19%), Hornsea (17%), Humbly Grove (17%), Holford (13%), Hatfield Moor (7%), Holehouse Farm (3%), and Hill Top Farm (1%).) Each of the nine caverns can comfortably hold St Paul's Cathedral within them.

In July 2021, both SSE and Equinor announced that were considering either repurposing the salt caverns for hydrogen storage, or creating nine newer caverns using pumped seawater to clear the salt layer out. Development of the site to store hydrogen as (H_{2}) was proposed as part of a low carbon economy for the United Kingdom. Hydrogen storage is nothing new to UK industries, H_{2} has been routinely stored in salt caverns underneath Teesside since the 1970s. The site on Teesside was completed in 1972, and consists of three caverns, each with the ability to store 70,000 cubic metres (2,500,000 cu ft) (a total of 210,000 cubic metres (7,400,000 cu ft) at a depth of 350 metres (1,150 ft) below ground, with a ratio of 95% (H_{2}), and 3-4% CO_{2}. Initial projections for storage at the Aldbrough site were in the region of enough (H_{2}) to generate 320 gigawatt hours (GWH).

The hydrogen will be generated onsite from water by using an electrolyser (green hydrogen), and then stored for available use when renewables cannot meet peak demand. For example, in December 2022, a cold snap in the United Kingdom forced the National Grid to pay inflated prices to operators of peak power gas generation plants when wind farms could not generate enough electricity due to a lack of wind. The two onsite companies would use green energy to produce the hydrogen, store it on site, and then burn it to produce clean energy when the system demands it. In April 2025, East Riding Council approved plans for the £350–£400 million project, which includes nine new caverns, surface buildings, a stack some 30 metres (98 ft) high to vent water vapour, and a pipeline to send the gas elsewhere such as Salt End or Keadby.
