= John Templeton (disambiguation) =

John Templeton (1912–2008) was a British businessman.

John Templeton is the name of:

- John Templeton (botanist) (1766–1825), Irish botanist
- John Templeton (tenor) (1802–1886), British opera singer
- John Montgomery Templeton (1840–1908), Australian businessman
- John Templeton Jr. (1940–2015), son and heir of John Templeton
