= Templeton Rye =

American rye whisky brand

- Type: Rye Whiskey
- Manufacturer: Templeton Rye Spirits, LLC
- Country of origin: United States
- Introduced: 2006
- Alcohol by volume: 40%
- Proof (US): 80
- Color: Amber
- Website: www.templetonrye.com

Templeton Rye refers to rye whiskey originally made in Templeton, Iowa, during the prohibition era as a way for farmers in the Carroll County area to supplement their income. Amber in color, it was considered to be of particularly high quality and was popular in Chicago, Omaha, and Kansas City speakeasies. It was said to be the mobster Al Capone's drink of choice. More recently "Templeton Rye" has been introduced as a brand of whiskey that its producer claims is based on a prohibition-era recipe. Distribution outside of Iowa began in August 2007.

Templeton Rye brand whiskey is distilled and aged in Lawrenceburg, Indiana, by MGP of Indiana utilizing a recipe shared with other brands. It is combined with an "alcohol flavoring formulation" from Clarendon Flavor Engineers referred to as “blenders”, which are added to make it taste as close as possible to original recipe from prohibition era and bottled at the distillery in Templeton, Iowa.

Pursuant to a class action settlement announced in 2015, Templeton added the words "distilled in Indiana" to the label and removed claims of "Prohibition Era Recipe" and "small batch." The settlement also afforded refunds to customers who bought Templeton Rye since 2006. The company is commencing distilling operations in Iowa, with the first product to appear in 2022.
