= Teynham Street =

Hamlet in Kent, England

Coordinates: 51.339372°N 0.824109°E

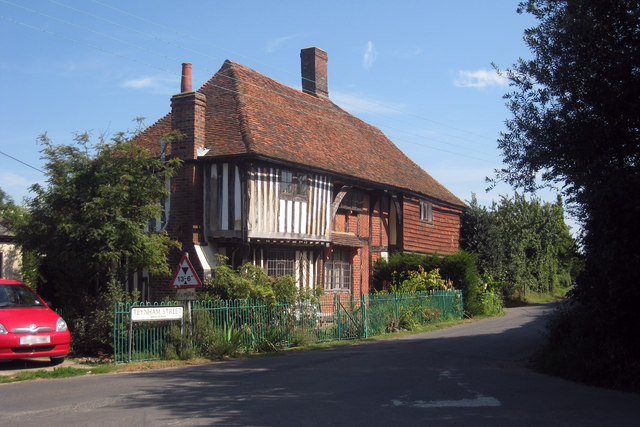
- Banks Farm Cottage, Teynham Street

- Location within Kent
- Civil parish: Teynham
- District: Swale
- Shire county: Kent
- Region: South East
- Country: England
- Sovereign state: United Kingdom
- Post town: Sittingbourne
- Postcode district: ME9
- Police: Kent
- Fire: Kent
- Ambulance: South East Coast
- UK Parliament: Sittingbourne and Sheppey

Teynham Street is a hamlet in the civil parish of Teynham, in the Swale district, in the county of Kent, England.
