= Tanwood =

Coordinates: 52.36846°N 2.14389°W

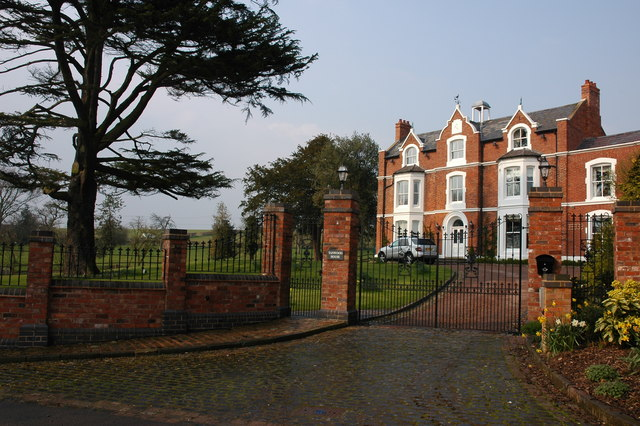
- Tanwood House

- Location within Worcestershire
- OS grid reference: SO903745
- Civil parish: Chaddesley Corbett
- District: Wyre Forest
- Shire county: Worcestershire
- Region: West Midlands
- Country: England
- Sovereign state: United Kingdom
- Post town: KIDDERMINSTER
- Postcode district: DY10
- Police: West Mercia
- Fire: Hereford and Worcester
- Ambulance: West Midlands

Tanwood is a hamlet in the English county of Worcestershire.

It lies about one mile northeast of the village of Chaddesley Corbett and forms part of the Wyre Forest District. It also lies within the civil parish of Chaddesley Corbett, which in 2021 had a population of 1,491.
