= Lilia =

Defensive pit traps used by Roman armies

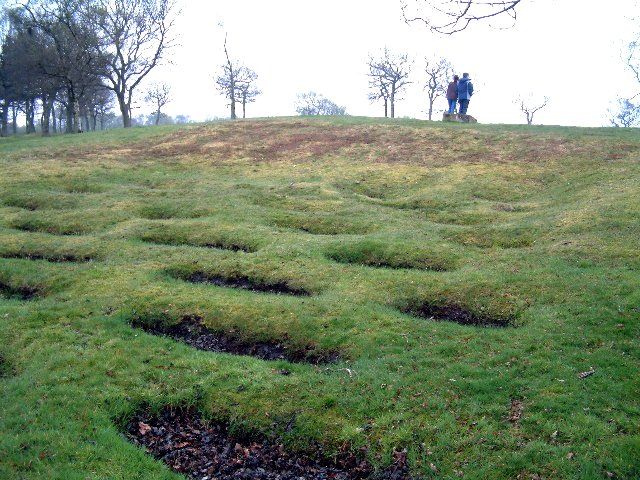
Lilia in front of Rough Castle on the Antonine Wall in central Scotland.

Lilia (Latin plural, meaning "lilies" in English; singular, lilium) are pit traps arranged in a quincunx pattern dug by the Roman armies in front of their defences. Frequently they had sharpened stakes set inside them as an extra obstacle to attackers.

Lilia have been found in front of both Hadrian's Wall in England and the Antonine Wall in Scotland.
