= William Templeton =

William Templeton may refer to:

- William Templeton (mayor) (1853–1898), sixth mayor of Vancouver, British Columbia, Canada
- William Templeton (screenwriter) (1913–1973), Scottish screenwriter and playwright
- William Paterson Templeton (1876–1938), Scottish Unionist Party politician
- Bill Templeton (1927–2005), Australian politician
