= Charles Templeton (cricketer) =

English cricketer

Charles Henry Templeton (24 November 1806 – 2 March 1834) was an English cricketer with amateur status. He was associated with Cambridge University and Kent and made his debut in 1827. He was educated at Winchester College and Trinity College, Cambridge.

== Bibliography ==
- Carlaw, Derek (2020). Kent County Cricketers, A to Z: Part One (1806–1914) (PDF). Cardiff: ACS.
- Haygarth, Arthur (1996) [1862]. Scores & Biographies, Volume 1 (1744–1826). Kennington: Frederick Lillywhite. ISBN 978-19-00592-23-9.
- Haygarth, Arthur (1997) [1862]. Scores & Biographies, Volume 2 (1827–1840). Kennington: Frederick Lillywhite. ISBN 978-19-00592-23-9.
