= Taverners Green =

Hamlet in Essex, England

Coordinates: 51.840°N 0.268°E

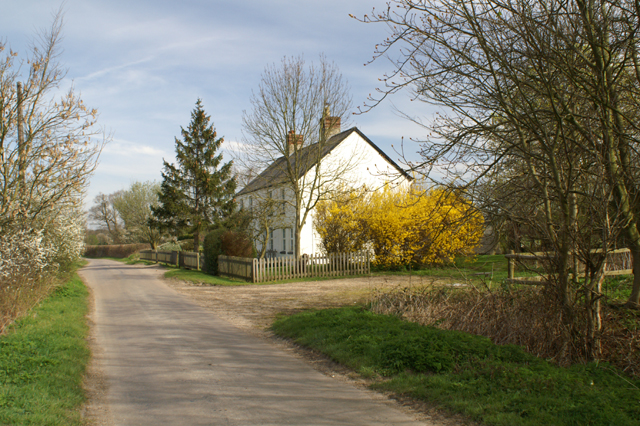

- Location within Essex
- Civil parish: Hatfield Broad Oak
- District: Uttlesford
- Shire county: Essex
- Region: East
- Country: England
- Sovereign state: United Kingdom

Taverners Green is a hamlet in the Hatfield Broad Oak civil parish of the Uttlesford district, in the county of Essex, England. Nearby settlements include the villages of Takeley and Hatfield Broad Oak.
