= Tansterne =

Hamlet in the East Riding of Yorkshire, England

Coordinates: 53.819566°N 0.145826°W

- Location within the East Riding of Yorkshire
- OS grid reference: TA221375
- Civil parish: Aldbrough
- Unitary authority: East Riding of Yorkshire
- Ceremonial county: East Riding of Yorkshire
- Region: Yorkshire and the Humber
- Country: England
- Sovereign state: United Kingdom
- Post town: HULL
- Postcode district: HU11
- Dialling code: 01964
- Police: Humberside
- Fire: Humberside
- Ambulance: Yorkshire
- UK Parliament: Beverley and Holderness

Tansterne is a hamlet in the East Riding of Yorkshire, England. It is situated approximately 2.5 miles (4 km) north-east of Sproatley and 1 mile (1.6 km) south-west of Aldbrough. It lies off the B1238 road.

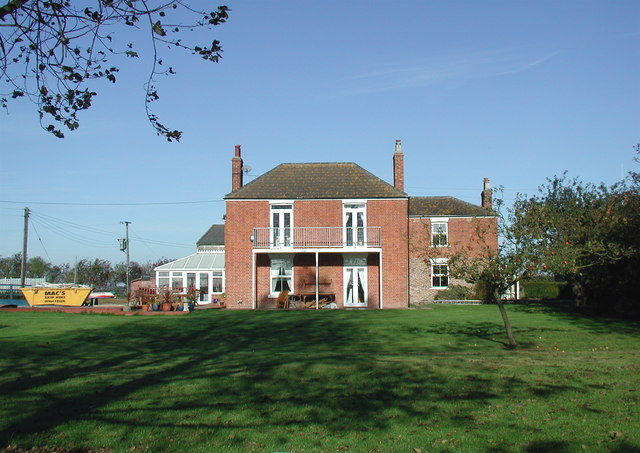
Tansterne Grange

It forms part of the civil parish of Aldbrough.
