= Tamfourhill =

Coordinates: 55.9972°N 3.8297°W

Scottish Gaelic: Tom a' Phùir
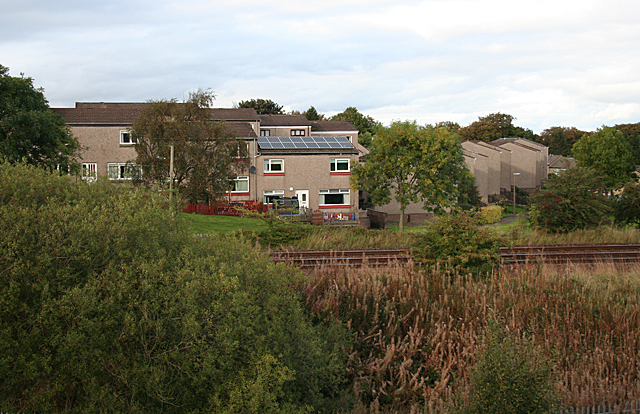
- These modern houses are close to the site of Tamfourhill, which, apparently vanished, like so many other old buildings, in the second half of the 20th century.

- Location within the Falkirk council area
- Population: 1,300 (2018)
- OS grid reference: NS858797
- Civil parish: Falkirk
- Council area: Falkirk
- Lieutenancy area: Stirling and Falkirk
- Country: Scotland
- Sovereign state: United Kingdom
- Post town: FALKIRK
- Postcode district: FK1
- Dialling code: 01324
- Police: Scotland
- Fire: Scottish
- Ambulance: Scottish
- UK Parliament: Falkirk
- Scottish Parliament: Falkirk West

Tamfourhill is a working-class residential suburb of Falkirk within the Falkirk (council area), Scotland. It is located approximately 1.5 miles (2.5 kilometres) west of the city centre. The Falkirk Wheel is located just to the northwest of the village. Tamfourhill includes the residential area between the south side of the Forth & Clyde Canal and the north side of the Union Canal. It also contains the Tamfourhill Industrial Estate. To the west of the village is a well preserved part of the Antonine Wall, built in the 2nd century and Rough Castle.
