= Thackthwaite =

Village in Cumbria, England

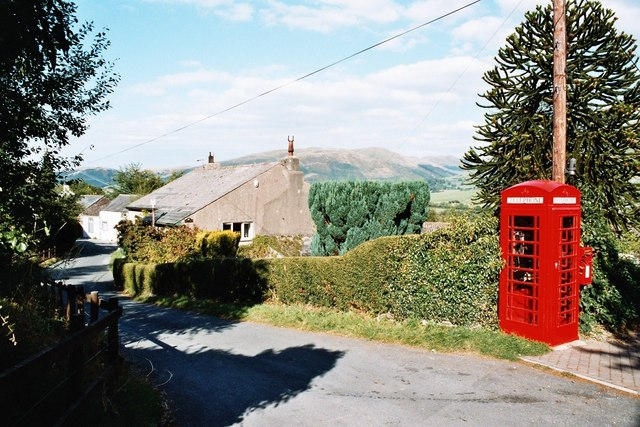
- Thackthwaite

- Location in Allerdale, Cumbria Location within Cumbria
- OS grid reference: NY148237
- Civil parish: Loweswater
- Unitary authority: Cumberland
- Ceremonial county: Cumbria
- Region: North West
- Country: England
- Sovereign state: United Kingdom
- Post town: COCKERMOUTH
- Postcode district: CA13
- Dialling code: 01900
- Police: Cumbria
- Fire: Cumbria
- Ambulance: North West
- UK Parliament: Penrith and Solway

Thackthwaite is a village in Cumbria, England, from which hikers can climb Low Fell and Fellbarrow.

The place-name contains thwaite ("clearing").

A second place called Thackthwaite is located just to the north of Little Mell Fell, at 54°37′17″N 2°53′31″W.
