= Tathall End =

Hamlet in Buckinghamshire, England

Coordinates: 52.1141°N 0.8030°W

- Location within Buckinghamshire
- OS grid reference: SP820468
- District: City of Milton Keynes
- Unitary authority: Milton Keynes City Council
- Ceremonial county: Buckinghamshire
- Region: South East
- Country: England
- Sovereign state: United Kingdom
- Post town: MILTON KEYNES
- Postcode district: MK19
- Dialling code: 01908
- Police: Thames Valley
- Fire: Buckinghamshire
- Ambulance: South Central
- UK Parliament: Milton Keynes North

Tathall End is a hamlet in the civil parish of Hanslope, Buckinghamshire. It is 1 mile from Hanslope village, and 3 miles from Castlethorpe. The River Tove flows through it. Several properties date back to the 17th century, including Tathall End Farmhouse, dated at 1640.
