= Robert Templeton (disambiguation) =

Robert Templeton (1802–1892) was an Irish naturalist, artist and entomologist .

Robert or Bobby Templeton may also refer to

- Bobby Templeton (footballer, born 1880) (1880–1919), Scottish footballer, played for several clubs and Scotland
- Bobby Templeton (footballer, born 1894) (1894–1967), Scottish footballer, played for and managed Hibernian F.C.
- Bob Templeton (footballer) (1927–2024), Australian footballer for Footscray
- Bob Templeton (rugby union) (1932–1999), Australian rugby union coach
- Dink Templeton (Robert Lyman Templeton, 1897–1962), American track and field athlete, rugby union and American football player
- Robert Templeton (artist) (1929–1991), American artist
- Robert Stanser Templeton (1855–1930), Anglo-Irish civil engineer and surveyor general of Ceylon
- Rob Templeton (born 1957), Australian cricketer
