= Aldbrough, East Riding of Yorkshire =

Village and civil parish in the East Riding of Yorkshire, England

Coordinates: 53.828945°N 0.113198°W

Aldbrough
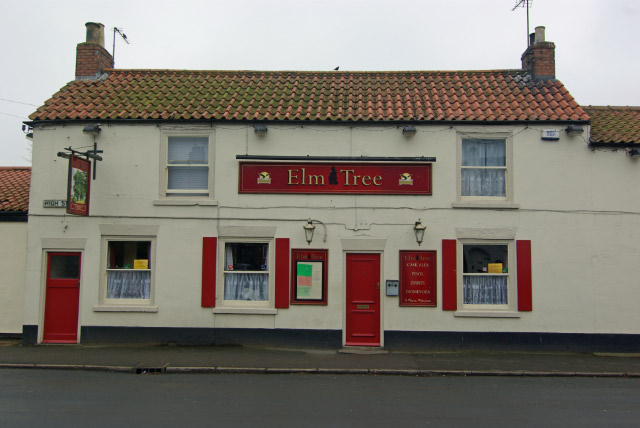
- The Elm Tree public house, High Street

- Location within the East Riding of Yorkshire
- Population: 1,269 (2011 census)
- OS grid reference: TA242386
  - London: 160 mi (260 km) S
- Civil parish: Aldbrough
- Unitary authority: East Riding of Yorkshire
- Ceremonial county: East Riding of Yorkshire
- Region: Yorkshire and the Humber
- Country: England
- Sovereign state: United Kingdom
- Post town: HULL
- Postcode district: HU11
- Dialling code: 01964
- Police: Humberside
- Fire: Humberside
- Ambulance: Yorkshire
- UK Parliament: Beverley and Holderness

Aldbrough is a village and civil parish in the East Riding of Yorkshire, England, about 12 miles (19 km) north-east of Hull at the junction of the B1242 and B1238 roads. It lies near to the North Sea coast within the area of Holderness. From the mediaeval era until the 19th century Aldbrough was part of Holderness Wapentake.

Between 1894 and 1935 it was part of the Skirlaugh Rural District and from 1935 to 1974 part of the Holderness Rural District, in the East Riding of Yorkshire. Between 1974 and 1996 it was part of the Borough of Holderness, in the county of Humberside.

The name Aldbrough derives from the Old English aldburh meaning 'old burh' (fortification).

== Civil parish ==
The civil parish is formed by the village of Aldbrough and the hamlets of East Newton, Etherdwick and Tansterne. According to the 2011 UK Census, Aldbrough parish had a population of 1,269, a fall from the 2001 UK Census figure of 1,336. The parish covers an area of 2,213.298 hectares (5,469.18 acres).

A hamlet at Ringbrough (or Ringborough) dates to at least the 11th century. By the 1850s it had been reduced to a single farm. It was substantially expanded as a military installation during the Second World War, with the installation of gun emplacements, lookouts, and underground bunkers. As of 2011 it is being destroyed by coastal erosion.

In 1823 Aldbrough was a parish in the Wapentake and Liberty of Holderness. The population, which included the townships of East and West Newton, numbered 998. Occupations included fourteen farmers, two blacksmiths, one of whom was a farrier, a joiner who was also an auctioneer, four wheelwrights, four grocers, five shoemakers, four tailors, two butchers, a hairdresser, a common brewer, and the landlords of The George and The Bricklayer's Arms public houses.

Also within the village were the parish vicar and the curate, three yeomen, two schoolmasters, two surgeons, a bailiff, an excise officer, a gentleman and a gentlewoman. Five carriers operated between Aldbrough and Hull twice weekly. The settlement of Fosham was 1 mile (1.6 km) to the south-east, its population included in Aldbrough. Fosham contained two farmers and a weekly carrier to Hull. There is also a Deserted Medieval Village called Bewick in the parish.

Between 1958 and 1975 the village was the location of a Royal Observer Corps monitoring bunker, to be used in the event of a nuclear attack. It slipped from the cliff face in 1989 due to coastal erosion and some of its remains can still be seen on the beach.

== Village ==
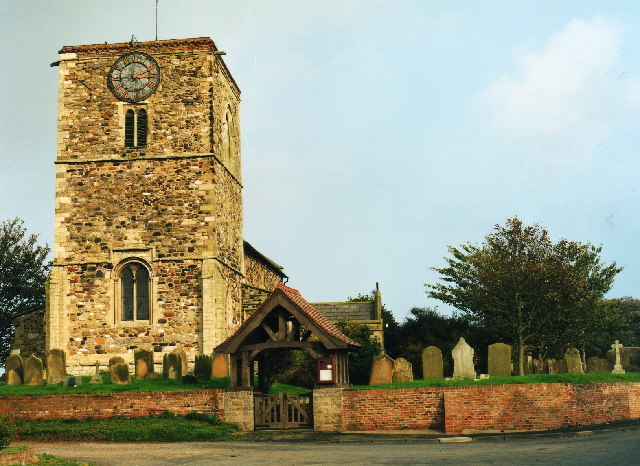
St Bartholemew's Church, Aldbrough

St Bartholomew's Church, Aldbrough is the Anglican parish church. Dating from the second half of the 14th century, it is a Grade II* listed building. On an interior wall (over a pillar of the south nave aisle) is a pre-conquest era sundial, bearing an inscription in mixed Anglo-Saxon and Old Norse: +VLF LET (?HET) AROERAN CYRICE FOR HANVM ⁊ FOR GVWARA SAVLA, usually translated as 'Ulf had this church built for his own sake and for Gunnvor's soul.'

Aldbrough has a public house and several small businesses within its boundaries and is close to the seaside towns of Hornsea and Withernsea.

== See also ==
- Aldbrough gas storage
