= Tanton, North Yorkshire =

Hamlet in North Yorkshire, England

Coordinates: 54.488°N 1.193°W

Tanton
- Hamlet
- Location within North Yorkshire
- OS grid reference: NZ524105
- Civil parish: Stokesley
- Unitary authority: North Yorkshire
- Ceremonial county: North Yorkshire
- Region: Yorkshire and the Humber
- Country: England
- Sovereign state: United Kingdom
- Post town: MIDDLESBROUGH
- Postcode district: TS9
- Police: North Yorkshire
- Fire: North Yorkshire
- Ambulance: Yorkshire
- UK Parliament: Richmond and Northallerton

Tanton is a hamlet in the civil parish of Stokesley, North Yorkshire, England. It lies on the B1365 which connects Stokesley in the south, with Marton in the north. The hamlet is 1.25 miles (2.01 km) north of Stokesley.

== History ==
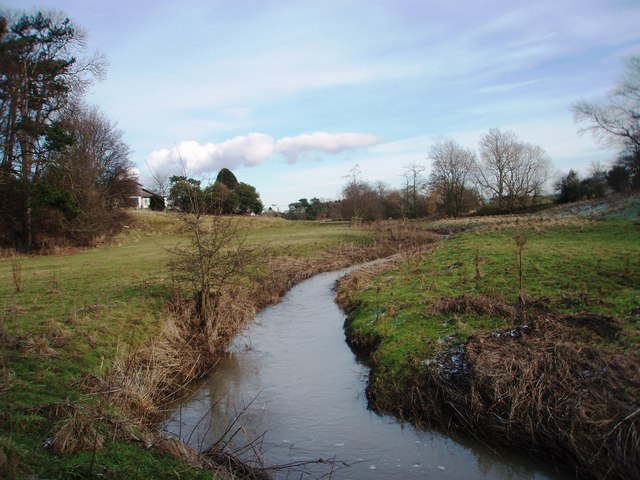
River Tame near Tanton

Tanton is mentioned in the Domesday Book as being in the Hundred of Langbaurgh, and having land belonging to three owners. Its name derives from its location upon the River Tame (Tūn on the River Tame). In the 13th century, William de Mowbray owned a water-mill on the Tame in the hamlet. Historically the hamlet was in the hundred of Langbaurgh, and the parish of Stokesley. Up until 1974, it was in the North Riding of Yorkshire. From 1974 to 2023 it was part of the Hambleton District, it is now administered by the unitary North Yorkshire Council.

Population statistics are given within those for the whole of the parish of Stokesley (which had 4,757 people at the 2011 census). The hamlet is represented at the Houses of Parliament as part of the Richmond and Northallerton constituency.

Tanton Bridge, a grade II listed structure built in the 18th century, was widened in 2020 to cope with increased traffic and larger vehicles. Previously only one vehicle could use the bridge at any one time, but since the widening works, the bridge now has two lanes. The road is a rat-run for people wishing to avoid traffic on the A19.

One of the versions of the surname Tanton derives from the village name.
