= Templeton, Angus =

Village in Angus, Scotland

Coordinates: 56°29′36″N 3°02′16″W

Templeton, Angus is a rural area to the north west of Dundee, Scotland, close to Camperdown House.

== See also ==
- List of places in Angus
