= Algernon (name) =

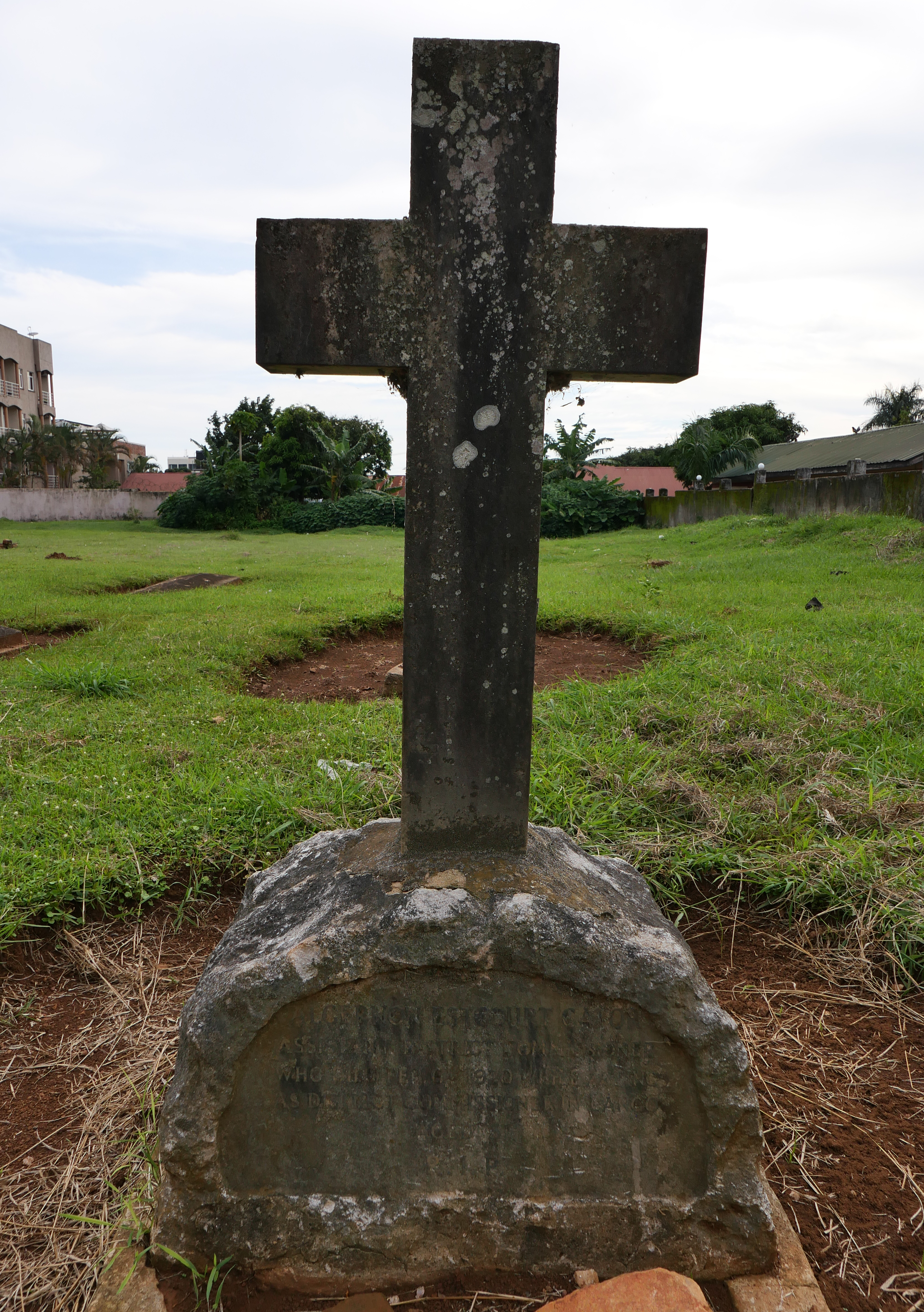
Tomb of Algernon Estcourt Cator at the European Cemetery in Entebbe, Uganda

Algernon is a masculine given name which derives from the Norman-French sobriquet Aux Gernons, meaning "with moustaches".

== People ==
=== Given name ===
- Algernon Ashton (1859–1937), English composer
- Algernon Sydney Biddle (1847–1891), American lawyer and law professor at the University of Pennsylvania Law School
- Algernon Blackwood (1869–1951), English writer
- Algernon Blair (1873–1952), American construction contractor
- Algernon Bligh (1888–1952), English cricket player
- Algernon Borthwick, 1st Baron Glenesk (1830–1908), English journalist
- Algernon Boyle (1871–1949), English naval officer
- Algernon "Algie" Brown (born 1991), American football player
- Algernon Buford (1826–1911), American president of the Richmond and Danville Railroad
- Algernon Burnaby (1868–1938), English landowner and soldier
- Algernon Butler (1905–1978), American judge
- Algernon Capell, 2nd Earl of Essex (1670–1710), English nobleman
- Algernon Capell, 8th Earl of Essex (1884–1966), British aristocrat and actor
- Algernon Chester-Master (1851–1897), English cricket player
- Algernon Collings (1853–1945), English cricket player
- Algernon J. Cooper (born 1944), American politician and lawyer
- Algernon Coote, 6th Earl of Mountrath (1689–1744), Irish politician
- Algernon Coote, 11th Baronet (1817–1899), Irish cricketer and clergyman
- Algernon de Courcy Lyons (1922–1993), Welsh photographer and writer
- Algernon Crapsey (1847–1927), American Episcopal priest
- Algernon "Alge" Crumpler (born 1977), American football tight end
- Algernon Egerton (former: Algernon Leveson-Gower, 1825–1891), English politician
- Algernon Findlay (1892–1956), Australian cricketer
- Algernon Fuller (1885–1970), British Army officer and inventor
- Algernon Charles Gifford (1861–1948), New Zealand astronomer
- Algernon Sidney Gilbert (1789–1834), American merchant and Latter-day Saint
- Algernon Gissing (1860–1937), English writer
- Algernon Gordon-Lennox (1847–1921), British Army officer
- Algernon Graves (1845–1922), English art provenance documenter
- Algernon Sidney Gray (1814–1878), American attorney and politician
- Algernon Greville (disambiguation), several people with this name
- Algernon Griffiths (1847–1899), English cricketer
- Sir Algernon Guinness, 3rd Baronet (1883–1954), British racing driver
- Algernon Hartridge (1831–1876), cotton merchant and Confederate Army officer
- Algernon Haskett-Smith (1856–1887), English cricketer and barrister
- Algernon Heber-Percy (born 1944), British landowner, farmer and public official
- Algernon Heneage (1833–1915), English naval officer
- Algernon Herbert (1792–1855), English antiquary
- Algernon Charles Holland (1919–2001), British businessman
- Algernon de Horsey (1827–1922), English naval officer
- Algernon B. Jackson (1878–1942), American physician and writer
- Algernon Keith-Falconer, 9th Earl of Kintore (1852–1930), English politician
- Algernon Kingscote (1888–1964), English tennis player
- Algernon Langhorne (1882–1945), English naval officer
- Algernon Lee (1873–1954), American educator
- Algernon Lushington (1847–1930), English cricket player
- Algernon Lyons (1833–1908), English naval officer
- Algernon Markham (1869–1949), English Anglican bishop
- Algernon Marsham (1919–2004), English cricket player
- Algernon Maudslay (1873–1948), English sailor and Olympic gold medal winner
- Algernon May (died 1704), English politician
- Algernon Methuen, 1st Baronet (born Algernon Stedman; 1856–1924), English publisher and founder of Methuen & Co.
- Algernon Moreing (1889–1974), English politician
- Algernon Newton (1880–1968), British landscape artist
- Algernon Oldham (died 1916), Archdeacon of Ludlow
- Algernon Willoughby Osborne (died 1915), British judicial officer
- Algernon Paddock (1830–1897), American politician
- Algernon Percy (disambiguation), several people with this name
- Algernon J. Pollock (1864–1957), American evangelist of the Plymouth Brethren and writer
- Algernon Pynegar (1883–1948), English footballer
- Algernon Ransome (1883–1969), British Army officer
- Algernon Rainbow (1885–1969), New Zealand accountant and local politician
- Algernon Winter Rose (1885–1918), English architect
- Algernon Edward Sartoris (1877–1928), American diplomat
- Algernon Seymour (disambiguation), several people with this name
- Algernon Sidney (1623–1683), English politician and opponent of King Charles II of England
- Algernon Skeffington, 12th Viscount Massereene (1873–1952), Ulster Unionist member of the Senate of Northern Ireland
- Algernon Smith (1842–1876), United States Army officer
- Algernon S. Speer, (1818–1857), American farmer and politician
- Algernon Stanley Smith (1890–1978), British missionary
- Algernon St Maur, 14th Duke of Somerset (formerly Seymour; 1813–1894), English nobility
- Algernon Sydney Sullivan (1826–1887), American lawyer
- Algernon Charles Swinburne (1837–1909), English writer and inventor of the roundel form in poetry
- Algernon Talmage (1871–1939), English Impressionist painter
- Algernon Temple-Gore-Langton, 5th Earl Temple of Stowe (1871–1940), English soldier, diplomat, and politician
- Algernon Thelwall (1795–1863), English Anglican clergyman
- Algernon Thomas (1857–1937), New Zealand geologist and biologist
- Algernon Tollemache (1805–1892), English politician
- Algernon Tudor-Craig (1873–1943), English Army officer
- Algernon Turnor (1845–1921), British civil servant
- Algernon Walker-Heneage-Vivian (1871–1952), British Royal Navy officer
- Algernon Ward (1869–1947), English Anglican priest and author
- Algernon Wells (1885–1946), British track and field athlete
- Algernon West (1832–1921), English politician
- Algernon Whiting (1861–1931), English cricketer and tea planter
- Algernon Wilkinson (1894–1967), English footballer
- Algernon Willis (1889–1976), English naval officer
- Algernon R. Wood (died 1869), American politician from Virginia
- Algernon Yau (born 1959), Hong Kong government official
- Algernon Yelverton, 6th Viscount Avonmore (1866–1910), Irish nobility

=== Surname ===
- Carl-Fredrik Algernon (1925–1987), Swedish Navy officer

== Fictional characters ==
- Algernon, a laboratory mouse in the short story and subsequent novel Flowers for Algernon by Daniel Keyes

== See also ==
- Algernon (disambiguation)
- United States v. Algernon Blair, Inc, a 1973 American lawsuit regarding its breach of contract with a subcontractor
- Plies (rapper), born Algernod Washington
