= Attorney General Osborne =

Attorney General Osborne may refer to:

- Frank I. Osborne (1853–1920), Attorney General of North Carolina
- Algernon Willoughby Osborne (died 1915), Attorney-General of the Gold Coast

== See also ==
- General Osborn (disambiguation)
