= Base Brown =

Fell in England

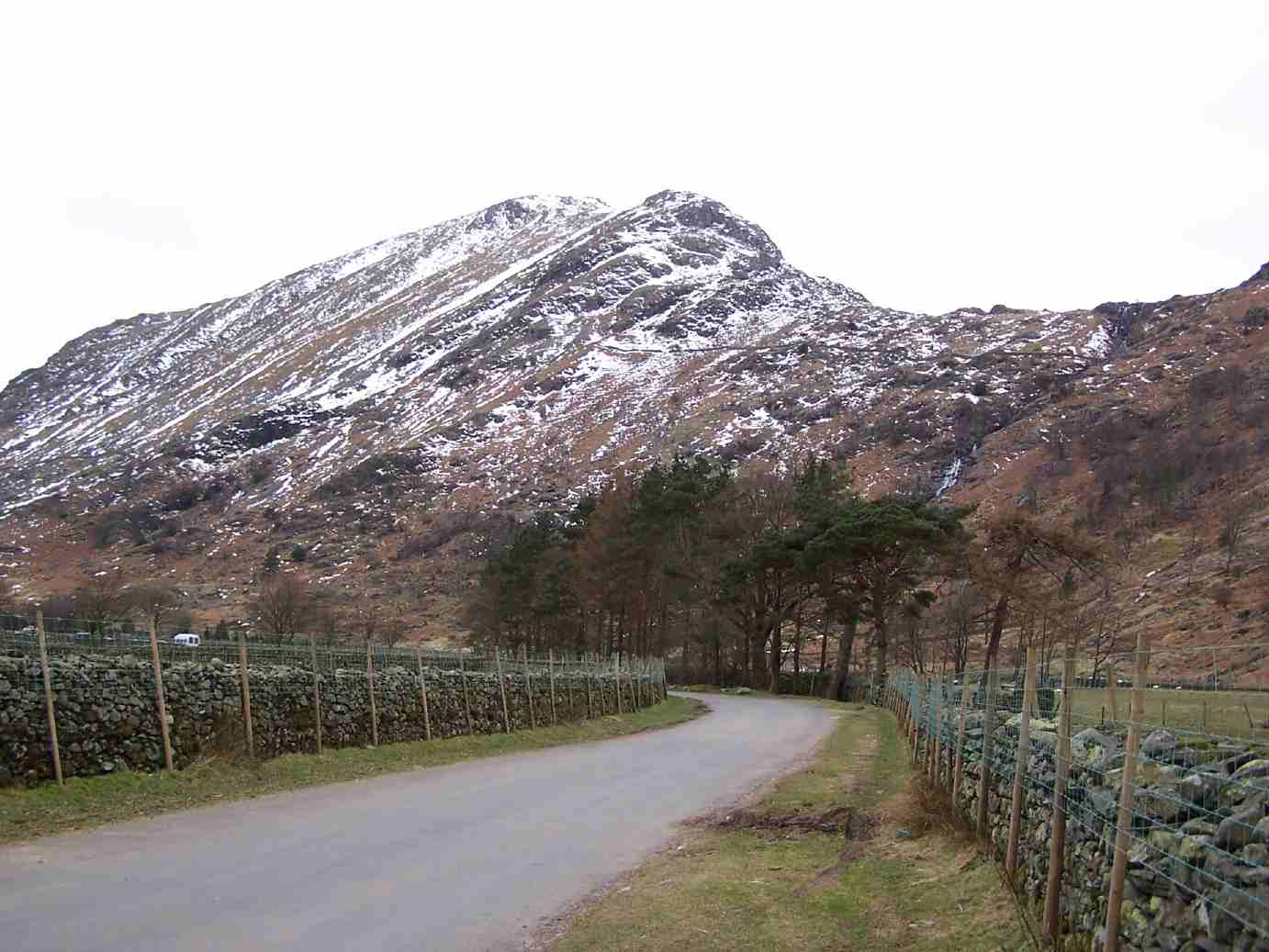
- Base Brown from the road to Seathwaite, near the Borrowdale Yews.

Highest point
- Elevation: 646 m (2,119 ft)
- Prominence: 38 m (125 ft)
- Parent peak: Green Gable
- Listing: Hewitt, Nuttall, Wainwright
- Coordinates: 54°29′31″N 3°11′53″W

Geography
- Location within the Lake District Location within the former Allerdale Borough
- Location: Cumbria, England
- Parent range: Lake District, Western Fells
- OS grid: NY225114
- Topo map: OS Landrangers 89, 90, Explorer OL4

Base Brown is a fell in England's Lake District, near the head of the Borrowdale Valley. It forms one side of the Seathwaite Valley, and on the western side it is flanked by the hanging valley of Gillercomb.

== Topography ==
The Western Fells occupy a triangular sector of the Lake District, bordered by the River Cocker to the north east and Wasdale to the south east. Westwards the hills diminish toward the coastal plain of Cumberland. At the central hub of the high country are Great Gable and its satellites, while two principal ridges fan out on either flank of Ennerdale, the western fells in effect being a great horseshoe around this long wild valley. Base Brown is a near neighbour of Great Gable, also bordering onto the Southern Fells.

Great Gable and its lesser companion Green Gable stand at the head of Ennerdale, with the walkers' pass of Sty Head to their backs. Base Brown is the summit of the north east ridge of Green Gable, standing out into Borrowdale. All of Base Brown's waters ultimately reach this valley, passing via Derwentwater to the sea at Workington.

A steep and rough slope descends north east from the summit of Green Gable, dropping through Mitchell Cove to the flat-topped and rather damp col of Blackmoor Pols 1,995 ft (608 m). Beyond this the ground rises again to the steep sided dome of Base Brown. On the south eastern face are crags overlooking Styhead Gill with Seathwaite Fell across the valley. The north western flanks are equally steep, but descending only half the vertical distance into the hanging valley of Gillercomb. This is the gathering ground of Sour Milk Gill, which drops over a series of falls around the northern extremity of Base Brown. Here it joins Styhead Gill and Grains Gill to form the nascent River Derwent. Across Gillercomb is the main ridge continuing north around Ennerdale, Brandreth being the initial fell. The top of Base Brown narrows considerably to the north of the summit, a prow-like ridge descending toward the falls of Sour Milk Gill. There is a prominent hanging stone here, startlingly poised over the rim of the crags. Another feature is the Seathwaite Slabs, a set of slabs of rocks used for rock climbing practice by novices and conveniently located only minutes from Seathwaite.

== Geology ==
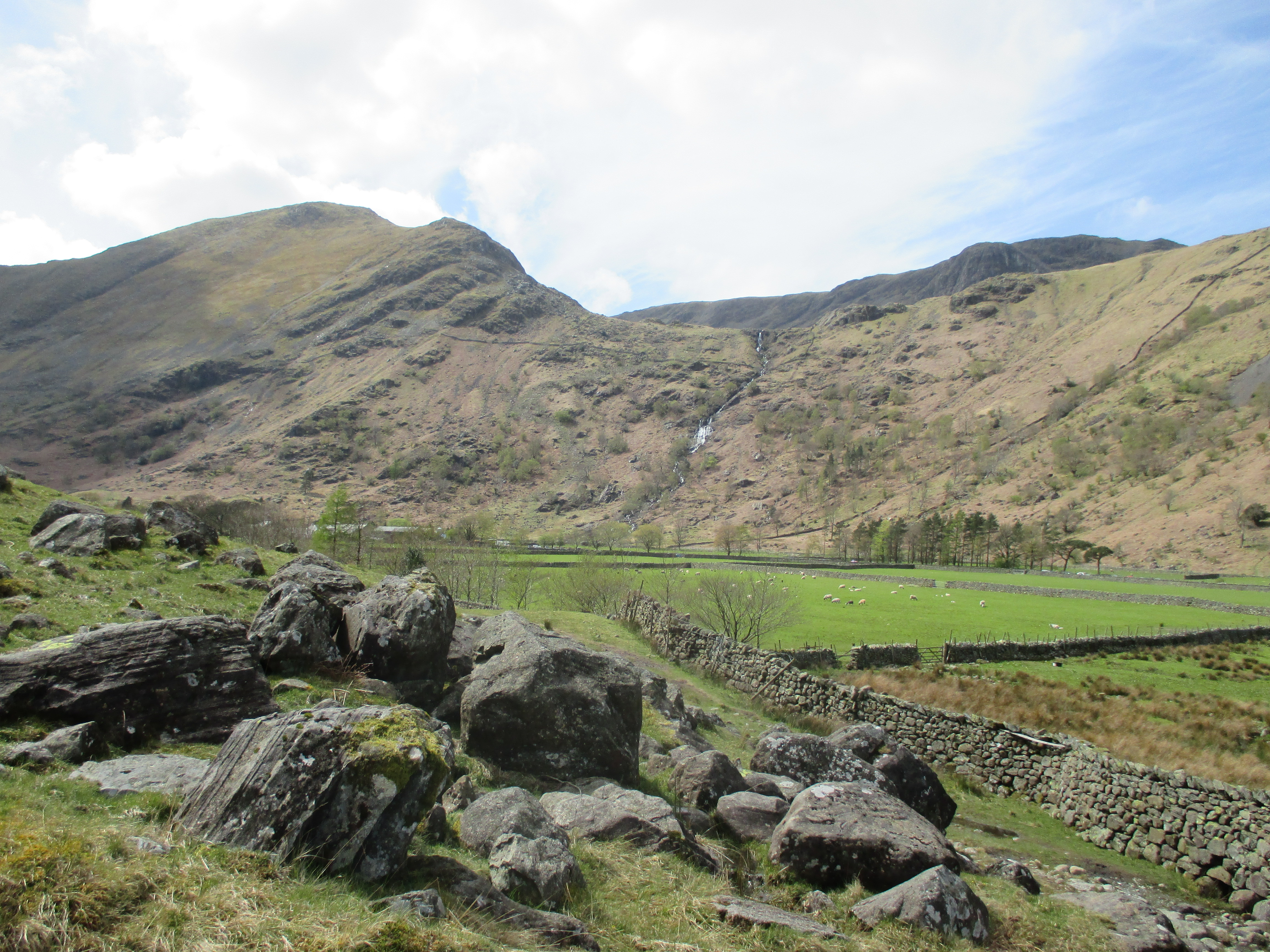
Base Brown, with Sourmilk Gill to its right.

The crags on either face of Base Brown display rocks of the Crinkle Member of the Airy's Bridge Formation. This consists mainly of welded rhyolitic lapilli tuff and tuff, with some breccia. There are also minor intrusions of andesite above Styhead Gill. The summit dome is overlain by till.

== Summit ==
Although surrounded by crags, the summit itself is of grass with a few boulders. A cairn marks the highest point. The view is restricted by higher neighbours, but the view north east down Borrowdale takes in Skiddaw and the Helvellyn range. The northern face of the Scafells is also seen in close up in the opposite direction. Water in view from the summit is restricted to Derwentwater and part of Styhead Tarn.

== Ascents ==
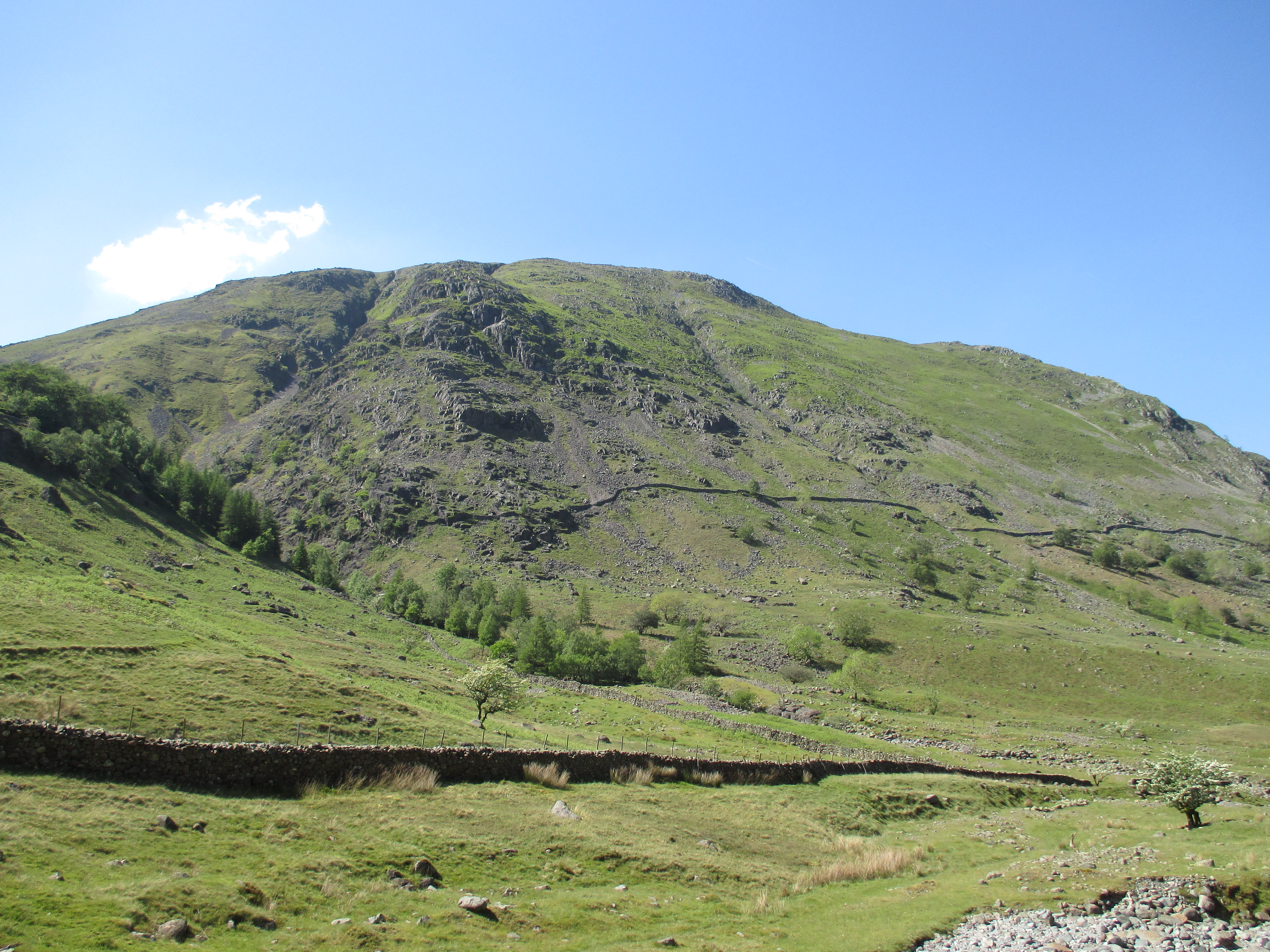
The east face of Base Brown

Base Brown is often passed on the way to Sty Head and Esk Hause, along the popular paths which start at Seathwaite. Base Brown is itself almost exclusively climbed from this hamlet, via the cascades of Sour Milk Gill. Once the foot of Gillercomb is reached a choice presents itself. Either the walker can continue up the gill to reach Blackmoor Pols and then make an easy traverse back to the summit, or a direct line can be taken up the north ridge. Base Brown can be used as the first step to climbing Green and Great Gable.
