= Brandreth =

Fell in the Lake District, Cumbria, England

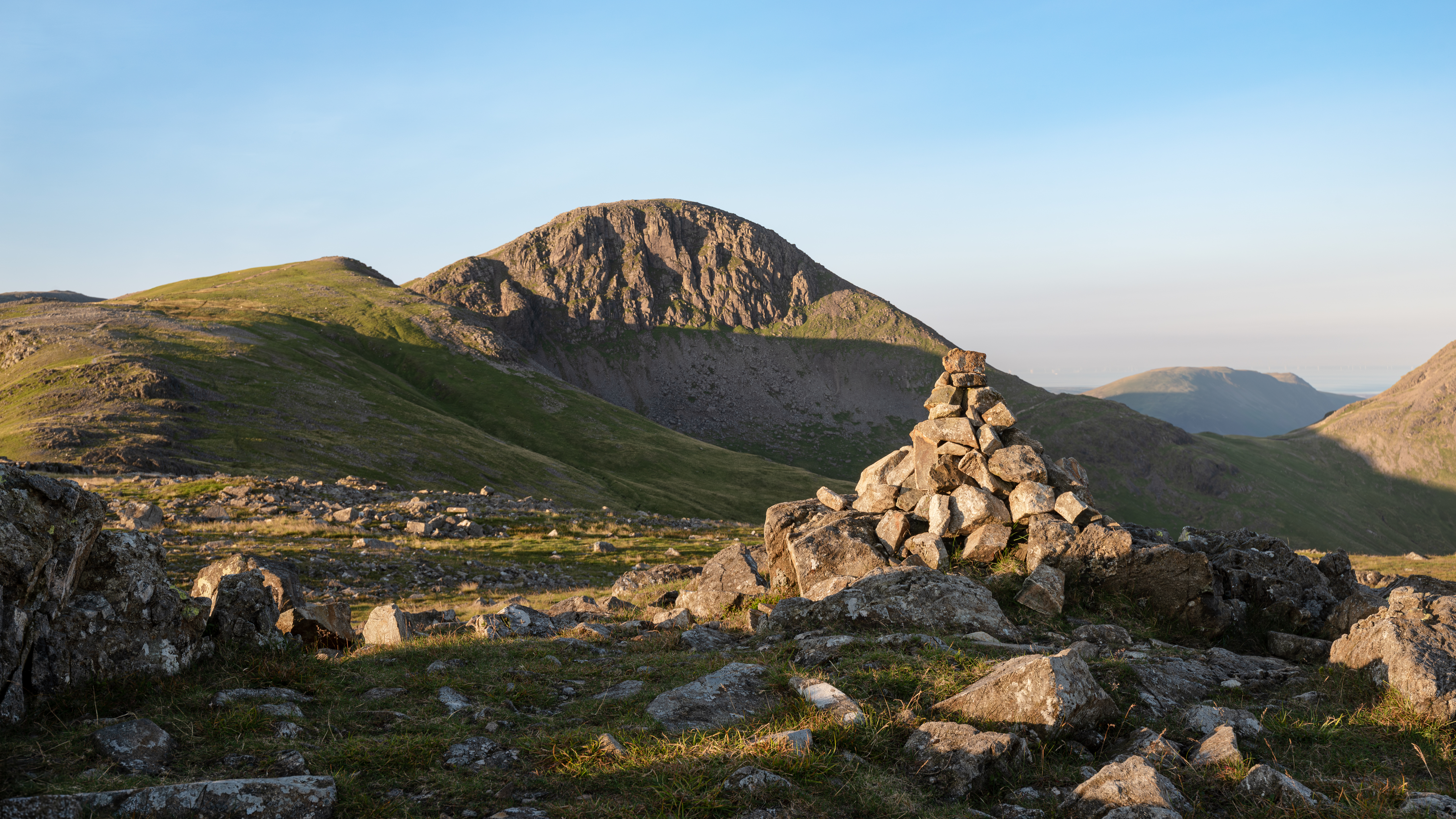
- Brandreth Summit

Highest point
- Elevation: 715 m (2,346 ft)
- Prominence: c. 60 m
- Parent peak: Great Gable
- Listing: Hewitt, Nuttall, Wainwright
- Coordinates: 54°29′46″N 3°12′43″W

Geography
- Location within the Lake District Location within the former Allerdale Borough Location within the former Borough of Copeland
- Location: Cumbria, England
- Parent range: Lake District, Western Fells
- OS grid: NY215119
- Topo map: OS Landranger 89, 90, Explorer OL4

Brandreth is a fell in the English Lake District. It stands between Great Gable and Haystacks in the Western Fells.

== Topography ==
The Western Fells occupy a triangular sector of the Lake District, bordered by the River Cocker to the north-east and Wasdale to the south-east. Westwards the hills diminish toward the coastal plain of Cumberland. At the central hub of the high country are Great Gable and its satellites, while two principal ridges fan out on either flank of Ennerdale, the western fells in effect being a great horseshoe around this long wild valley. Brandreth is a near neighbour of Great Gable, forming part of the head of Ennerdale.

The spine of the range runs north from Great Gable via Green Gable to Brandreth, before curving north-west to form the watershed between Ennerdale and Buttermere. The fells along this section are Haystacks and the High Stile group. A lesser ridge also runs out north-east from Brandreth to Grey Knotts, bending around parallel to the main range to form the side valley of Warnscale. Fleetwith Pike encloses Warnscale on the other side.

As a consequence of its three connecting ridges, Brandreth assumes a triangular plan. The south-west face falls steeply, but relatively smoothly to Ennerdale, Brin Crag being the only prominent feature. To the east a rim of crags mark the drop into Gillercomb. This classic hanging valley lies between Brandreth and Base Brown, emptying around the latter into the wide strath of Borrowdale at Seathwaite. The northern slopes fall gently toward Warnscale, the workings of Dubs Quarry lying at the foot of the slope. Brandreth is thus the only fell to feed Ennerdale Water, Derwentwater and Buttermere.

The ridge connecting to Green Gable narrows to Gillercomb Head, complete with a number of small tarns, following the line of the ruined Ennerdale boundary fence. The connection to Grey Knotts is wider, but still a definite ridge, crossing the stony terrain where the transition from one fell to the other is hard to determine. North westward the topography is more complex, a sloping tableland gradually resolving into the ridge of Haystacks as the high ground is squeezed between Warnscale Beck and the River Liza. The rocky top of Great Round How marks the completion of the change.

== Geology ==
The summit area composes the plagioclase-phyric andesite lavas of the Birker Fell Formation. A band of volcaniclastic sandstone passes near to the actual top. Further south are outcroppings of the Whorneyside Formation (bedded tuff and sandstone with some breccias, interspersed with andesite sills.) The lower slopes are covered by drift. Dubs Quarry at the foot of the northern slope is an extensive slate working, now abandoned.

== Summit ==
The summit area is bleak and stony, marked by the remains of old fences. The top is identified by a cairn built around a boundary post where the three ridgeline fences meet. The view south is obstructed by the Gables, but in all other directions the high fells of Lakeland are laid out. Pillar, High Stile and the North Western Fells are particularly well seen, a view enhanced from lower down the western slope.

== Ascents ==
The summit of Honister Pass provides a convenient high level start. There is a well marked and mainly stoned path starting close to the youth hostel which leads directly to the summit by way of Grey Knotts. Another route follows the remains of the inclined tramway to the Drum House and then contours around the western slopes of Grey Knotts. From Gatesgarth at the head of Buttermere, a path runs up the valley of Warnscale Beck. Passing around the crags of Haystacks it then crosses the plateau to pick up the Ennerdale fence, bound for Brandreth. If climbing from Borrowdale then the path alongside Sour Milk Gill into Gillercomb can be used, followed by a stiff pull up to Gillercomb Head. A long walk up Ennerdale can also be the prelude to an ascent of Brandreth. Many walkers will ascend the fell indirectly from one of its neighbours, or avoid the summit altogether as they follow the contouring path from Honister to Great Gable.
