= Algernon Greville (disambiguation) =

Algernon Greville (1798–1864) was an English soldier and cricketer, and Bath King of Arms.

Algernon Greville may also refer to:

- Algernon Greville (MP) (c.1677–1720), Member of Parliament for Warwick
- Algernon Greville, 2nd Baron Greville (1841–1909), Member of Parliament for Westmeath

== See also ==
- For other people with the given name Algernon, see Algernon (name)
- For other uses and people with the name of Greville, see Greville (disambiguation)
- For other uses of Algernon, see Algernon (disambiguation)
