= Green Gable =

Mountain in the Lake District, England

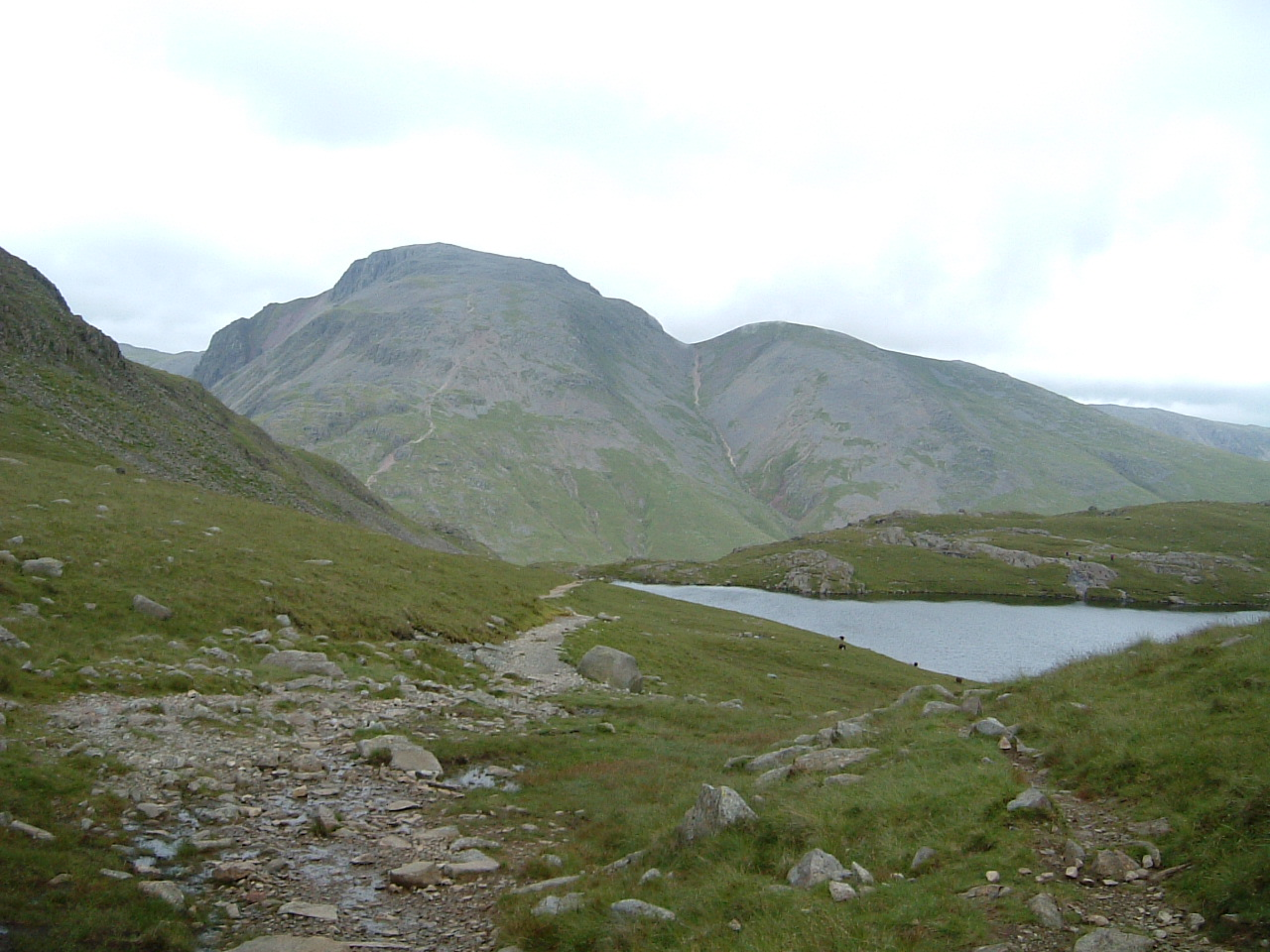
- Great and Green Gable from Sprinkling Tarn. Green Gable is the smaller hump on the right.

Highest point
- Elevation: 801 m (2,628 ft)
- Prominence: c.50 m
- Parent peak: Great Gable
- Listing: Hewitt, Wainwright, Nuttall
- Coordinates: 54°29′08″N 3°12′53″W

Geography
- Location within the Lake District Location within the former Allerdale Borough Location within the former Borough of Copeland
- Location: Cumbria, England
- Parent range: Lake District, Western Fells
- OS grid: NY214107
- Topo map: OS Landrangers 89, 90, ExplorerOL4

Green Gable is a fell in the English Lake District often traversed by walkers en route to its more famous neighbour Great Gable. It can be ascended from Honister Pass, Seathwaite in Borrowdale, or Ennerdale. There are good views of Gable Crag, Scafell Pike and the Buttermere valley from the summit.

== Topography ==
The Western Fells occupy a triangular sector of the Lake District, bordered by the River Cocker to the north east and Wasdale to the south east. Westwards the hills diminish toward the coastal plain of Cumberland. At the central hub of the high country are Great Gable and its satellites, while two principal ridges fan out on either flank of Ennerdale, the western fells in effect being a great horseshoe around this long wild valley. Green Gable stands to the north east of its mightier sibling.

Green and Great Gable rise at the head of Ennerdale, the infant River Liza tumbling down from their connecting col, Windy Gap. To their backs they have the walkers' pass of Sty Head, connecting Borrowdale to Wasdale. Green Gable has a footing in Borrowdale only, standing to the north of the pass. It is from Ennerdale that the fell achieves a peaked "gabled" outline, although only the lower slopes could be considered green- the summit area being a desert of stones.

Taking Great Gable as the pivot of the Western Fells, the northward arm begins over Green Gable, before swinging round over Brandreth and Haystacks to begin the long northern wall of Ennerdale. Green Gable also has a secondary ridge to the north east, culminating in the separate fell of Base Brown.

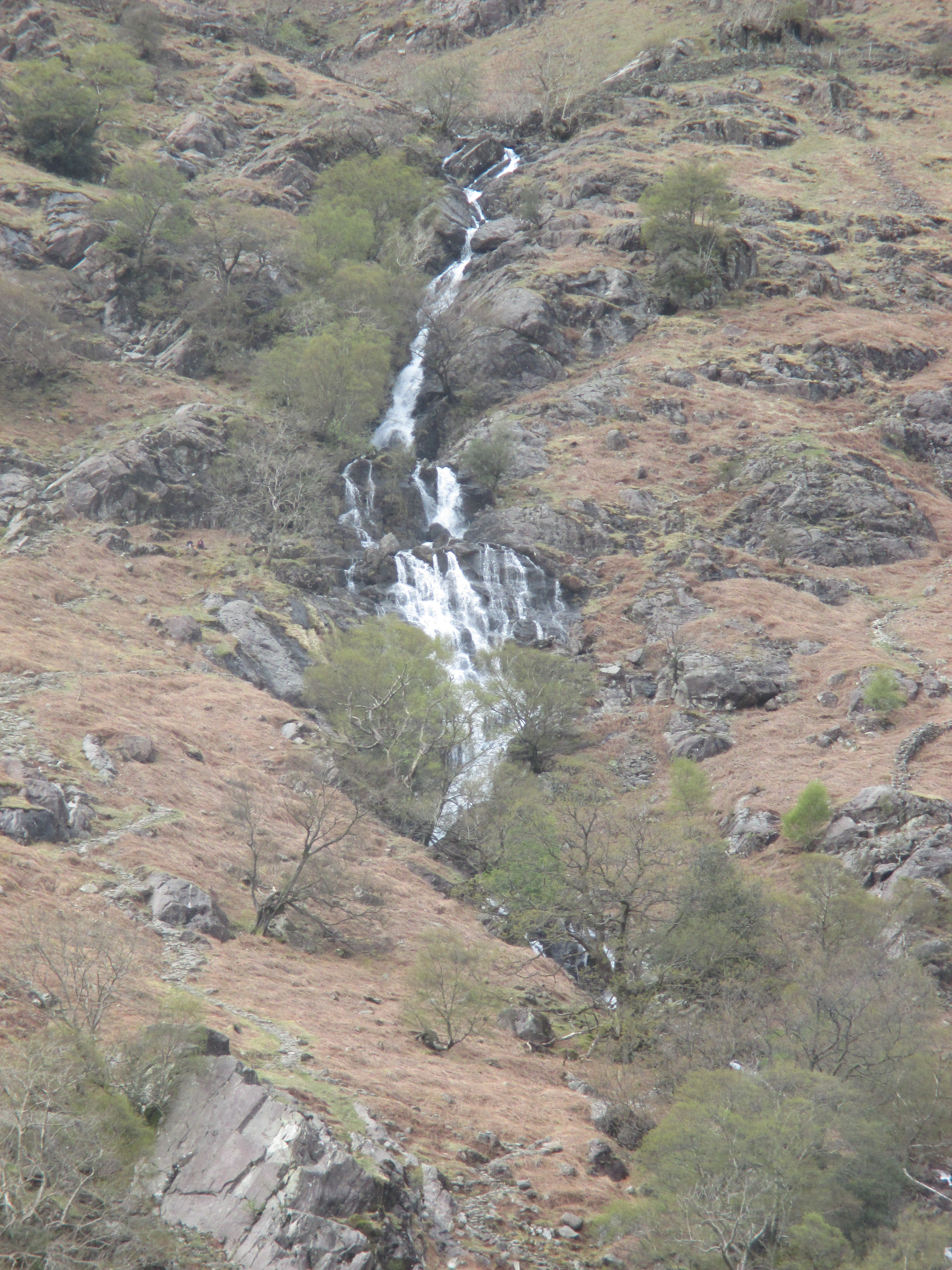
Sourmilk Gill

Windy Gap (2,460 feet, 750 m) stands a little way to the south west of the summit, at the bottom of a stony slope. On the Ennerdale side is Stone Cove- not named by chance, they are yards deep- while the south eastern descent leads down Aaron Slack. "Slack" is the dialect word for scree, and this too is a rough chute leading down to Sty Head Pass. Sty Head Tarn lies at the bottom of the Slack, a large pool in a scooped out hollow, the outlet blocked by boulders. It is 30 feet (9 m) deep and reputed to contain trout.

Green Gable's eastern face contains the slight hollow of Mitchell Cove, its stream joining Styhead Gill on the way to Borrowdale. At the northern corner is the ridge to Base Brown, the flat topped depression of Blackmoor Pots. The dale between the Base Brown and Brandreth ridges is Gillercomb, a classic hanging valley. Its stream, Sourmilk Gill, exits around the nose of Base Brown via a series of cascades to Seathwaite. This ensures that all of Green Gable's waters, bar those from the western face, reach the River Derwent. Brandreth connects via the narrow ridge of Gillercomb Head, site of a few small pools after wet weather. The Ennerdale side provides the gentlest slopes, at least at lower levels, with the long grassy spur of Tongue gradually rising up the fell. The topmost section however is guarded by Greengable Crags, stretching around from Stone Cove.

== Geology ==
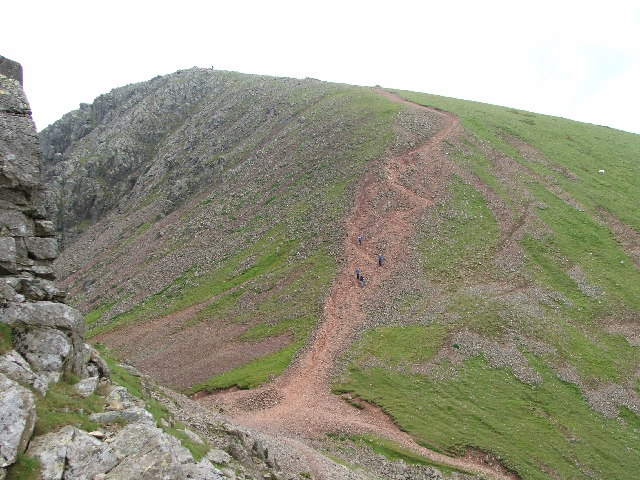
Summit of Green Gable, from the Great Gable path - showing rough track down to Windy Gap.

The summit of Green Gable is overlain by till, although there are outcrops of the Long Top Member to the west and north. This comprises bedded and welded rhyolitic tuff and lapilli tuff. Above Sty Head there are examples of Scafell dacite and the tuffs and breccias of the Lingmell Formation. There is no history of mining on the fell.

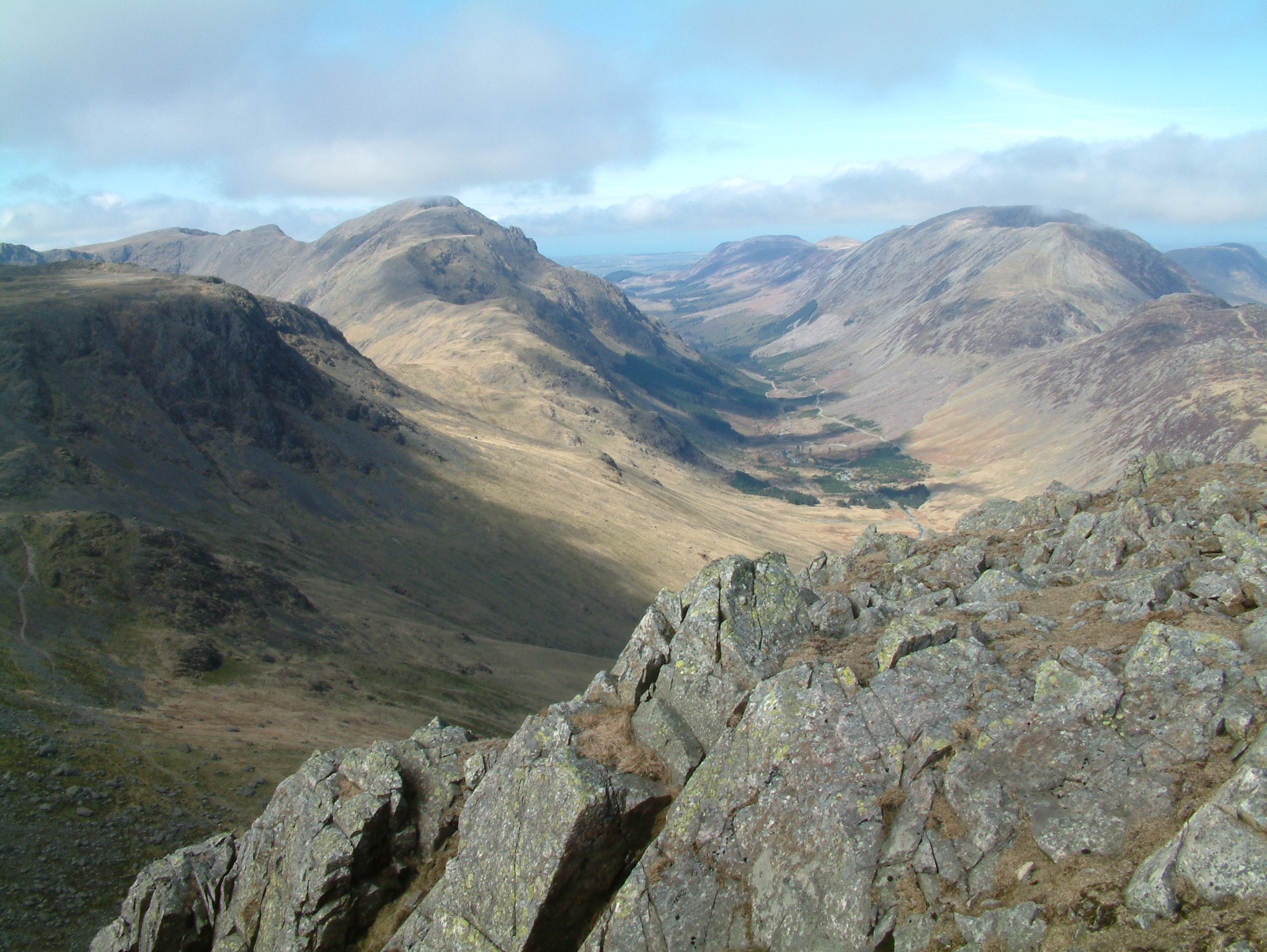
Looking NW from Green Gable summit down the Ennerdale valley.

== Summit ==
Green Gable has a neat summit marked by a cairn and would be a famous spot in its own right but for the looming presence of Great Gable. The summit is the perfect position from which to admire Gable Crag, and in all other directions is undiminished in its view of the Lakeland fells. The view up the Buttermere valley is perhaps the highlight.

== Ascents ==
Some of the routes are those used for Great Gable, in particular those from the north. From Seathwaite a path runs up beside Sour Milk Gill into Gillercomb. From here it continues up the flank of the Blackmoor Pols ridge and onto the summit. From the top of the Honister Pass road a contouring path runs around Grey Knotts and Brandreth, before ascending Green Gable via Gillercomb Head. This path can also be used to access Moses Trod, a high level route from Honister to Wasdale. "Moses" was a possibly apocryphal figure in local stories, a quarryman from Honister who doubled as a trader-cum-whisky smuggler between the Lakeland valleys.

A route from Seathwaite not designed for the ascent of Great Gable can be found by climbing up Styhead pass and then branching off into Mitchell Cove, following the beck almost to the summit. Aaron Slack can also be used. If starting from Ennerdale a long walk up the valley can culminate in either a climb up Stone Cove to Windy Gap, or a slightly easier ascent of the Tongue to reach Gillercomb Head. Indirect climbs via Brandreth or Base Brown are also possible.
