= Algernon Percy =

Algernon Percy may refer to:

- Algernon Percy, 10th Earl of Northumberland (1602–1668), English military leader
- Algernon Percy, 1st Earl of Beverley (1750–1830), peer known as Lord Algernon Percy from 1766–86
- Hon. Algernon Percy (diplomat) (1779–1833), son of 1st Earl of Beverley, Minister to the Swiss Cantons
- Algernon Percy, 4th Duke of Northumberland (1792–1865), British aristocrat and Conservative politician
- Algernon Percy, 6th Duke of Northumberland (1810–1899), British Conservative politician
- Lord Algernon Percy (1851–1933), British Conservative Party politician and career soldier

== See also ==
- Algernon (name)
