= Edgar Chester-Master =

English cricketer

Edgar Chester-Master (6 May 1888 – 17 September 1979) was an English cricketer. He was born in Westminster and died in Durban.

Chester-Master made a single first-class appearance for the side, during the 1911 season, against Middlesex. From the tailend, Chester-Master scored 4 runs in the first innings in which he batted, and a duck in the second.

Chester-Master played Minor Counties cricket for Dorset between 1908 and 1921.

Chester-Master's father, Algernon, also played first-class cricket for Gloucestershire.
