= Grey Knotts =

Fell in the Lake District, Cumbria, England

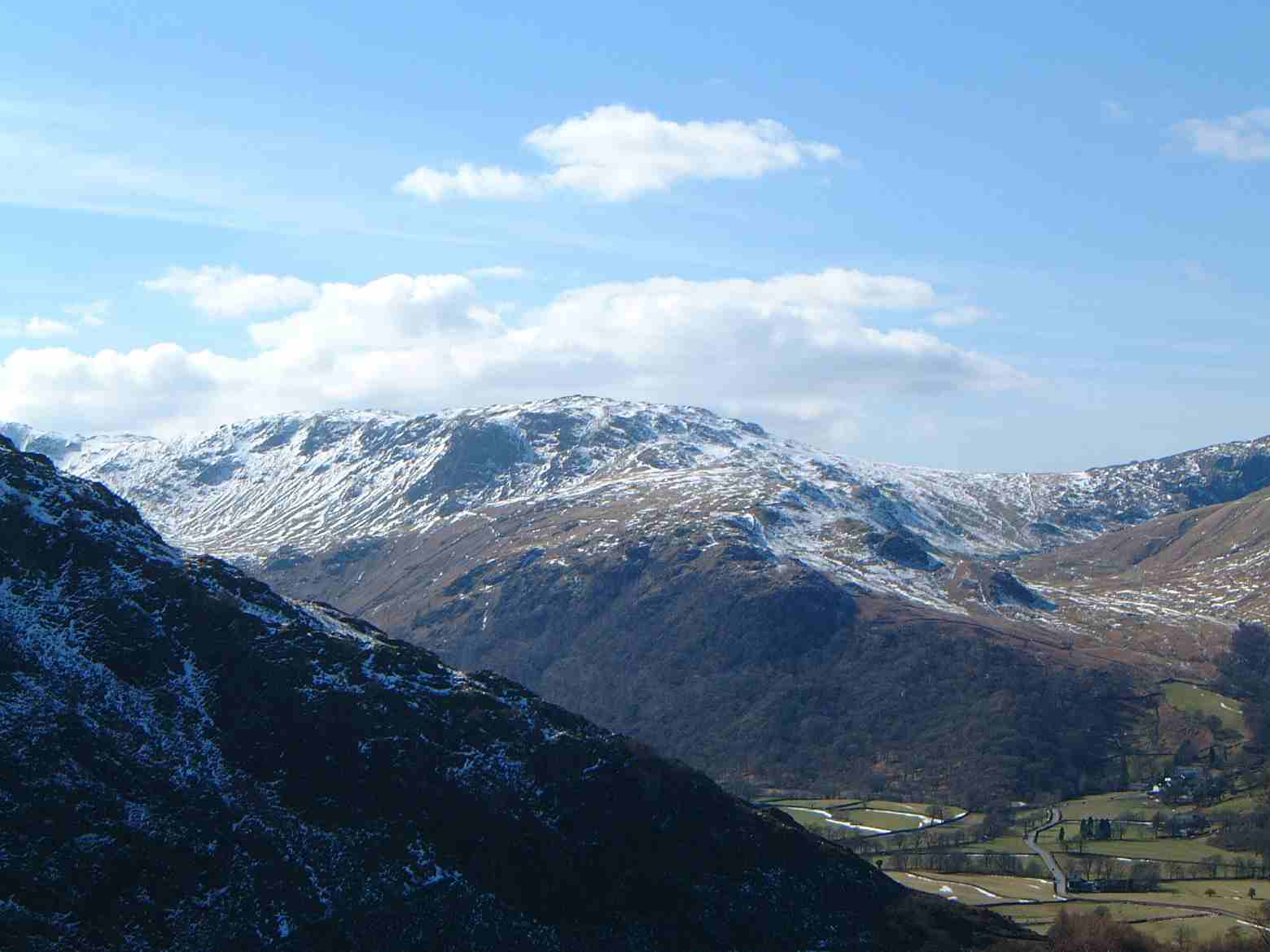
- Grey Knotts seen from above the Stonethwaite valley

Highest point
- Elevation: 697 m (2,287 ft)
- Prominence: c. 15 m
- Parent peak: Brandreth
- Listing: Wainwright, Nuttall
- Coordinates: 54°30′11″N 3°12′29″W

Geography
- Location within the Lake District Location within the former Allerdale Borough
- Location: Cumbria, England
- Parent range: Lake District, Western Fells
- OS grid: NY217125
- Topo map: OS Landranger 89, 90 OS Explore Outdoor Leisure 4

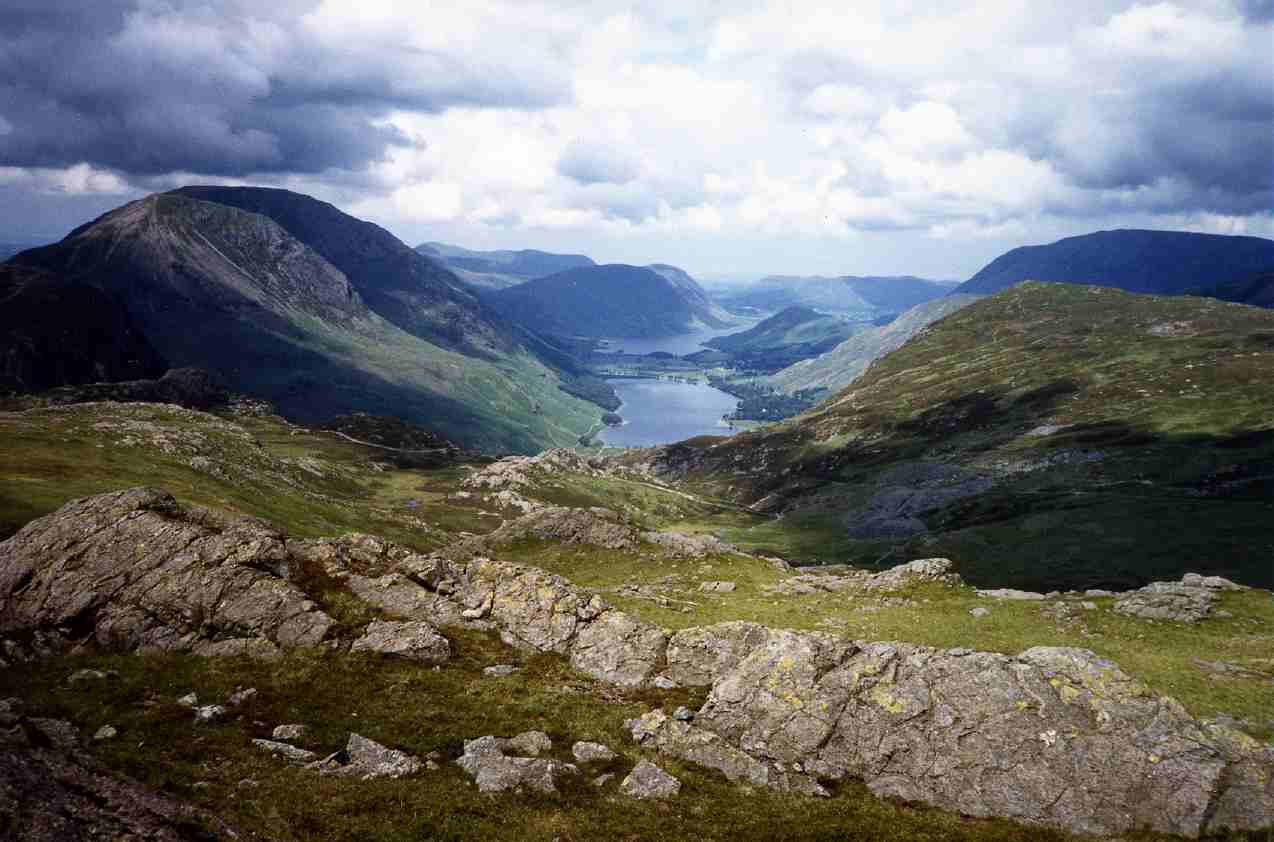
The Buttermere valley from Grey Knotts.

Grey Knotts is a fell in the English Lake District. It is situated one kilometre (2/3 mile) south of the B5289 road as it crosses the Honister Pass. It is well seen from mid-Borrowdale as it rises above Seatoller. Grey Knotts reaches a height of 697 metres (2,287 feet) and is part of a ridge which ascends from the woodland behind Seatoller and continues south-west and then south for four kilometres to Great Gable. The fell's name really only applies to the summit rocks, but has been adopted for the entire fell with the high ground in this area, locally known as Seatoller Fell on Ordnance Survey maps.

== Topography ==
Grey Knotts is a "Wainwright" fell and also qualifies as a Nuttall, but this must be considered a borderline case, as it barely has the required 15 metres of prominence to the adjoining higher fell of Brandreth.

All the highlights of Grey Knotts are situated on the eastern (Borrowdale) side of the fell, Raven Crag, known as Gillercombe Buttress to rock climbers. It is a popular area for bouldering, using the large number of large boulders that have become detached from the main crag. There are also several conventional climbing routes up the main crag. Gillercomb (spelled like this on map) is a fine example of a hanging valley from which issues the stream of Sour Milk Gill, which descends into Borrowdale in a series of picturesque cascades.

== Geology ==
The principal rock types are the plagioclase-phyric andesite lavas of the Birker Fell Formation.

== Graphite mine ==
Also on the Borrowdale side of the fell at the upper end of Newhouse Gill at grid reference NY231128 is the site of the former Borrowdale graphite (then called Plumbago) mines. The mine was started in the 16th century by German immigrants; the graphite found was in a very pure form and in those early days was used only for marking sheep. Later, however, graphite was found to be suitable for lining the casting moulds for cannon and musket balls, which caused its value to soar in the 17th century, as England, France and the Dutch Republic built up their armies. The graphite was also used in pencil-making, which in 1790 led to the founding of the Cumberland pencil industry based in Keswick. The mine closed in 1891 after new techniques meant that graphite no longer needed to be so pure, so the Borrowdale mine became uneconomical.

== Ascents ==
Grey Knotts can be ascended from Seathwaite or Seatoller in Borrowdale or from the top of the Honister Pass. The route from Seathwaite goes up Newhouse Gill thus allowing the walker to inspect the old graphite mines while the path from Seatoller has to use the B5289 road for a kilometre before going onto the fell and following a wall for some distance then climbing the northern end of Raven Crag to reach the summit. Grey Knotts is often climbed from the top of the Honister Pass which gives the advantage of starting at a height of 356 metres (1167 feet). Walkers often use Grey Knotts as a stepping stone for the ascent of Great Gable from Honister Pass also passing over the adjoining fells of Brandreth and Green Gable on the way.

== Summit ==
The top of the fell is dotted with grey tors of rock and two of these give the fell twin tops of equal height, the eastern top has an Ordnance Survey trig point. There are also several small tarns on the summit as well as some fence posts which can be an aid to navigation. The view from the summit is very good with the Buttermere valley well seen to the north west and the Scafell massif standing out to the south.
