= Algernon Seymour =

Algernon Seymour may refer to:

- Algernon Seymour, 7th Duke of Somerset (1684–1750), MP for Marlborough and Northumberland
- Algernon St Maur, 14th Duke of Somerset (former: Seymour, 14th Duke of Somerset, 1813–1894), English peer, father of the 15th Duke
- Algernon Seymour, 15th Duke of Somerset (1846–1923), English peer, sailor, soldier and patron
- Algernon Seymour (priest) (1886–1933), Anglican priest and Provost of St. Mary's Cathedral, Glasgow

== See also ==
- Algernon (name)
- Seymour (surname)
