= General Osborn =

General Osborn may refer to:

- Frederick Osborn (1889–1981), U.S. Army major general
- Thomas O. Osborn (1832–1904), Union Army brigadier general and brevet major general
- Sir George Osborn, 4th Baronet (1742–1818), British Army general

== See also ==
- Edmund Osborne (1885–1969), British Army lieutenant general
- Attorney General Osborne (disambiguation)
