= Walter Parry Haskett Smith =

English rock climber (1859–1946)

- Born: 28 August 1859; Bognor Regis, England
- Died: 11 March 1946 (aged 86)

Walter Parry Haskett Smith (28 August 1859 – 11 March 1946) was an English barrister-at-law, athlete, traveller and pioneer rock climber.

== Background ==
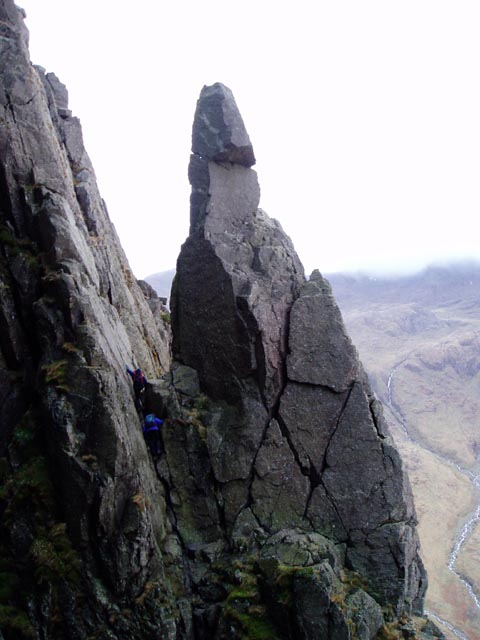
Napes Needle on Great Gable, first climbed by Haskett Smith in 1886

Born in Bognor Regis, England, he was the second son of the landowner Haskett Smith (1813–1895) of Goudhurst and his wife Anne nee Davies; the cricketer Algernon Haskett-Smith was his elder brother. He was educated at Eton College where he excelled at athletics. He matriculated at Trinity College, Oxford in 1879, graduating B.A. in 1882 and M.A. in 1887. At Oxford he attained a long jump unofficial world record of 25.5 feet (7.8 m).

Haskett Smith was called to the bar at Lincoln's Inn in 1885. There is no indication that he worked as a barrister.

== Climber ==
On a university reading party at Aber, Wales in 1880, Haskett Smith became interested in exploring local cliffs, and in 1881 he journeyed to the Lake District and took a room at the inn at Wasdale Head, staying there for two months, meeting Frederick Herman Bowring, an enthusiastic fell-scrambler some forty years older, and, in essence, becoming Bowring's protégé. Bowring had also been an athlete in his university days, reaching 21 feet in the long jump in the 1840s.

By the following summer, Haskett Smith had begun to record his efforts – which were more akin to what we now think of as rock climbing than to the exposed scrambles of previous generations. His most famous climb was his 1886 first ascent of the Napes Needle, which he accomplished, by himself, without any sort of protective devices - eschewing the use of ropes, spikes, and ladders as aids required by inferior climbers. His climbing style was muscular and gymnastic, similar to that of Owen Glynne Jones, Haskett Smith's successor - after 1895 - as leading British rock climber.

A lifelong devotee of etymologies, and possessing a gift for describing past acquaintances, Haskett Smith delighted in producing rambling and witty pieces about his athletic avocation. For instance, in his description of Bear Rock in "Climbing in the British Isles", the reader divines a subtle poke at the new pastime of bouldering: "a queerly-shaped rock on Great Napes, which in the middle of March, 1889 was gravely attacked by a large party comprising some five or six of the strongest climbers in England. It is a little difficult to find, especially in seasons when the grass is at all long."

== See also ==
- Fell & Rock Climbing Club
