= Algernon =

Algernon may refer to:

- Algernon (name), a given name (includes a list of people and characters with the name)
- Algernon Township, Custer County, Nebraska, United States

== See also ==
- Treaty of Algeron, an agreement signed by the United Federation of Planets and the Romulan Star Empire in Star Trek
- "Flowers for Algernon", a science fiction short story and subsequent novel written by Daniel Keyes
- United States v. Algernon Blair, Inc., a 1973 American lawsuit regarding its breach of contract with a subcontractor
- Růže pro Algernon, Aleš Brichta album
