= Algernon Lushington =

English cricketer

Personal information
- Full name: Algernon Hay Lushington
- Born: 29 September 1847; Lyndhurst, Hampshire, England
- Died: 13 September 1930 (aged 82); Shanklin, Isle of Wight, England
- Batting: Right-handed
- Bowling: Unknown

Domestic team information
- Years: Team
- 1870–1877: Hampshire

Career statistics
Competition	First-class
Matches	3
Runs scored	48
Batting average	8.00
100s/50s	–/–
Top score	21
Balls bowled	176
Wickets	3
Bowling average	32.66
5 wickets in innings	–
10 wickets in match	–
Best bowling	2/48
Catches/stumpings	1/–
- Source: Cricinfo, 10 December 2009

Algernon Hay Lushington (29 September 1847 – 13 September 1930) was an English first-class cricketer.

The son of Frederick Astell Lushington and Lady Margaret Julia Hay, he was born at Lyndhurst in September 1847. He was educated at Rugby School, before going up to Trinity College, Cambridge. A resident of Shanklin on the Isle of Wight where he was a member of Shanklin Cricket Club, Lushington made three appearances in first-class cricket for Hampshire, the first of which came against Lancashire at Southampton in 1870. He would not play his next two first-class matches until 1877, when he appeared against the Marylebone Cricket Club at Lord's and Kent at Southampton. In three first-class matches, Lushington took 3 wickets and scored 48 runs. Lushington died at Shanklin on the Isle of Wight in September 1930. At the time of his death he was heir-presumptive to his cousin, Sir Andrew Lushington, the 5th Baronet of the Lushington baronets. His great-grandfather was James Hay, 15th Earl of Erroll.
