= Algernon Chester-Master =

English cricketer

Personal information
- Full name: Algernon William Chester-Master
- Born: 27 September 1851; Almondsbury, Gloucestershire, England
- Died: 1 July 1897 (aged 45); Northampton, Northamptonshire, England
- Relatives: Edgar Chester-Master (son)

Domestic team information
- Years: Team
- 1870: Gloucestershire

Career statistics
Competition	First-class
Matches	2
Runs scored	5
Batting average	5.00
100s/50s	–/–
Top score	5
Catches/stumpings	4/–
- Source: Cricinfo, 25 June 2010

Algernon Chester-Master (27 September 1851 – 1 September 1897) was an English cricketer.

Chester-Master represented Gloucestershire in two first-class matches in 1870, against Surrey and the Marylebone Cricket Club.

Chester-Master died at Northampton, Northamptonshire on 1 September 1897.

== Family ==
Chester-Master's son Edgar Chester-Master played first-class cricket for Gloucestershire and Minor Counties Cricket for Dorset.
