= Algernon Whiting =

English cricketer

Personal information
- Full name: Algernon Oswald Whiting
- Born: 23 April 1861; Kensington, London, England
- Died: 23 January 1931 (aged 69); Worcester Park, Surrey, England
- Batting: Right-handed

Domestic team information
- Years: Team
- 1881–1882: Oxford University

Career statistics
Competition	First-class
Matches	9
Runs scored	317
Batting average	18.64
100s/50s	–/2
Top score	80
Catches/stumpings	6/–
- Source: Cricinfo, 24 April 2020

Algernon Oswald Whiting (23 April 1861 – 23 January 1931) was an English first-class cricketer and tea planter.

The son of George Whiting, he was born at Kensington in April 1861. He was educated firstly at Charterhouse School, before leaving there for Sherborne School in 1874. From Sherborne, he went up to Merton College, Oxford. While studying at Oxford, he played first-class cricket for Oxford University, making his debut against the Gentlemen of England at Oxford in 1881. He played first-class cricket for Oxford until 1882, making a total of nine appearances. Whiting scored a total of 317 runs in his nine matches, at an average of 18.64 and a high score of 80.

After graduating from Oxford, Whiting became a tea planter at Haputale in British Ceylon. While in Ceylon, he was a key figure in the early growth of cricket on the island. By the late 1920s, he held a number of directorships of tea and rubber plantations in Ceylon. Whiting died in January 1931 at Worcester Park, Surrey.
