= Algernon Pynegar =

English footballer

Personal information
- Full name: Algernon Pynegar
- Date of birth: 22 October 1883
- Place of birth: Marlpool, England
- Date of death: 23 June 1948 (aged 64)
- Height: 5 ft 9 in (1.75 m)
- Position: Forward

Senior career*
Years	Team	Apps	(Gls)
1902–1903	Marlpool		
1903–1904	Whitwick White Cross		
1904–1905	Derby County	1	(0)
1905–1906	Grimsby Town	2	(0)
1906–1907	Rotherham Town		
1907	Rotherham County		
1907	Tottenham Hotspur		
1907–1908	Denaby United		
1908–19??	Heanor United		
- * Club domestic league appearances and goals

Algernon Pynegar (22 October 1883 – 23 June 1948) was an English professional footballer who played as a forward.
