= Algernon Winter Rose =

British architect

Algernon Winter Rose MC
- Born: 23 December 1885; Cambridge, Cambridgeshire, England
- Died: 29 October 1918 (aged 32); Hastings, Sussex, England
- Resting place: Quendon, Essex
- Known for: architecture

Captain Algernon Winter Rose MC (1885-1918) was an architect of English country houses and gardens during the Edwardian period. Described as a man '...of original mind and unstinted devotion to his art', his flourishing career was curtailed by the First World War and his untimely death at the age of 32 during the flu epidemic of 1918.

== Early life ==
Algernon Winter Rose was the son of Thomas Edward (a boot manufacturer) and Kate Elizabeth Rose. Rose was born in Cambridge and educated at Bedford Modern School. He was subsequently articled to a local firm of architects, Messrs Usher and Anthony of Bedford. He received further training with Beddoe Rees and W.D. Caroe and at H.M. Office of Works. His early reputation was gained through the award of the Pugin Medal and a travelling studentship of the Architectural Association, and he established his own practice at Westminster in 1906.

== Designs ==
Rose's work appeared regularly in magazines such as The Builder and Country Life as well as in the architectural section of the exhibitions of the Royal Academy. His houses included Woolmer Wood on Marlow Common, Buckinghamshire, and Marrowells in Weybridge, Surrey, designed for Sir Vernon Kell. Upton House on Grange Road, Cambridge, designed by Rose in the style of the Arts and Crafts Movement has been described as one of the most attractive houses in the City.

Rose was also sought after for his garden designs. He laid out the gardens at Eastlands, Walberswick, Suffolk for the portrait artist Arthur Dacres Rendall. He also designed the gardens at Morton House and Goodrich House, both in Hatfield, Hertfordshire.

== War Service ==
Rose was commissioned in the Essex Yeomanry on 21 October 1914. He fought at the Battle of the Somme in 1916 and was awarded the Military Cross for action during the Battle of Arras in 1917. He became Adjutant to his Regiment and in 1918 he transferred to Staff College at which point he was attached to the Royal Air Force. After serving for almost the entirety of the War relatively unscathed he succumbed to influenza and died at the Hermitage RAF Hospital in Hastings on 29 October 1918.

== Personal life ==
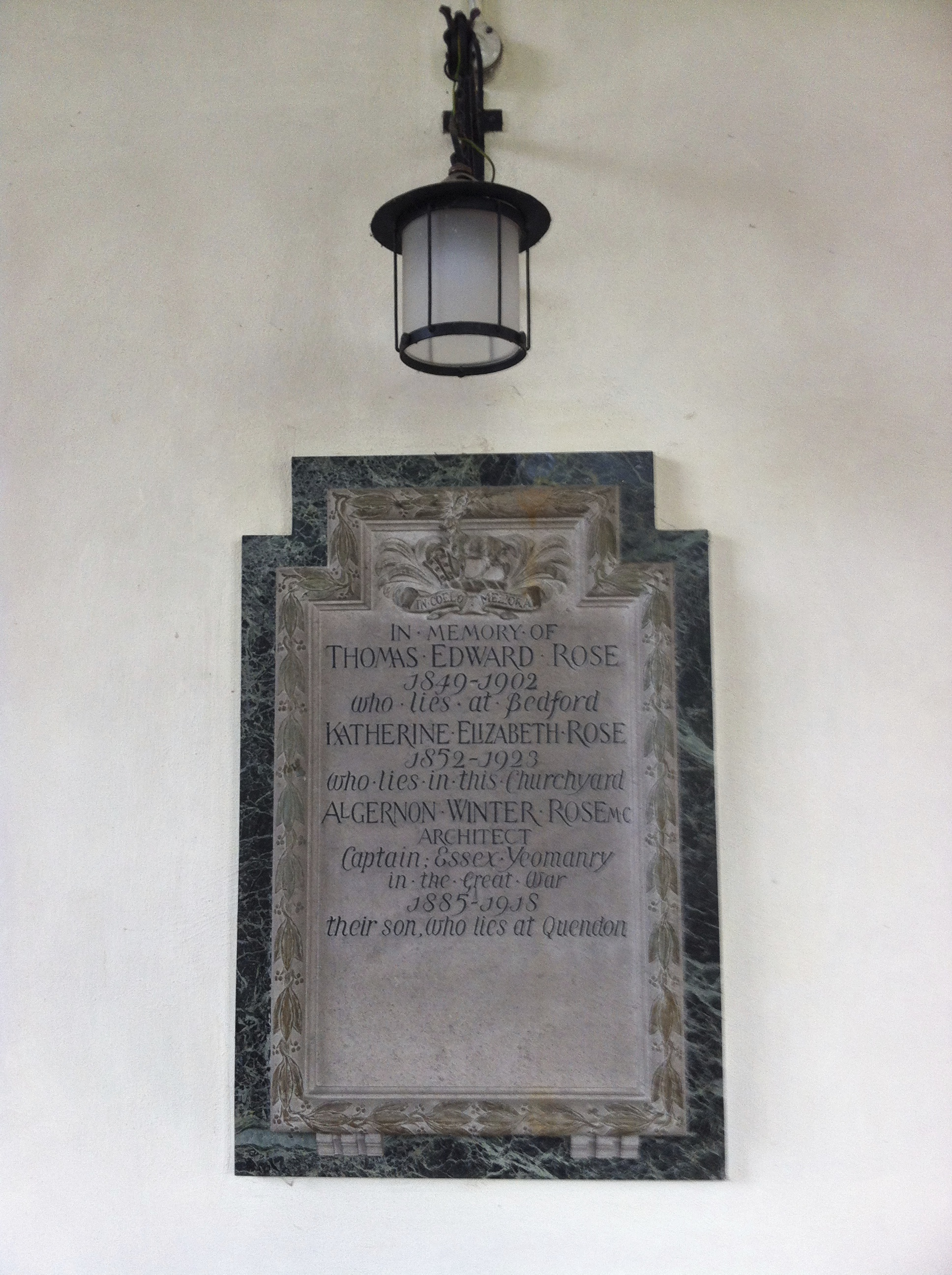
Memorial to the Rose family, St. Andrew's Church, Walberswick

Algernon Rose was a very good rugby player and he captained Ealing from the 1907 season as well as playing representative matches for the Eastern Counties. He married Winifred Foot Mitchell of Quendon Hall, Essex in 1913; they had two daughters. Rose and his mother and father are commemorated by a memorial at St Andrew's Church, Walberswick. (pictured)
