= Algernon Haskett-Smith =

English cricketer, barrister

Personal information
- Full name: Algernon Haskett-Smith
- Born: 4 July 1856; Marylebone, London, England
- Died: 21 November 1887 (aged 31); Paddington, London, England
- Height: 5 ft 7 in (1.70 m)
- Batting: Right-handed

Domestic team information
- Years: Team
- 1879: Oxford University

Career statistics
Competition	First-class
Matches	5
Runs scored	114
Batting average	16.28
100s/50s	–/–
Top score	38
Catches/stumpings	2/–
- Source: Cricinfo, 8 April 2020

Algernon Haskett-Smith (4 July 1856 – 21 November 1887) was an English first-class cricketer and barrister.

The son of landowner Haskett Smith (1813–1895) of Goudhurst and the elder brother of the rock climber Walter Parry Haskett Smith, he was born in July 1856 at Marylebone. He was educated at Eton College, before going up to University College, Oxford. While studying at Oxford, he made his debut in first-class cricket for A. W. Ridley's XI against Oxford University at Oxford in 1879. In the same season he also played three first-class matches for Oxford University, including in The University Match against Cambridge. His final first-class appearance came in August 1879, for the Gentlemen of Kent against the Gentlemen of England at Canterbury. In five first-class matches, Haskett-Smith scored 114 runs at an average of 16.28, with a high score of 38.

A student of the Middle Temple, Haskett-Smith was called to the bar in January 1883. He died at Marylebone in November 1887, following an 'accidental' discharge from his shotgun. He was known to frequent the male brothel at 19 Cleveland Street, which was popular with members of high society including royalty and nobility, and was two years after his death the centre of the Cleveland Street scandal. Rumours persisted that his death was a suicide relating to his homosexuality.
