= Algernon Collings =

English cricketer

Algernon William Collings (4 September 1853 — 14 May 1945) was an English cricketer who played for Gloucestershire.

He was born in Sarratt in Hertfordshire and died at his home in Burghfield Common in Berkshire.

Collings made a single first-class appearance, during the 1874 season, against Yorkshire. Batting in the tailend, he scored a single run in the only innings in which he batted, as his team won the match by an innings margin.
