= Algernon Wilkinson =

English footballer

Personal information
- Date of birth: 21 January 1894
- Place of birth: Greasbrough, England
- Date of death: 1967 (aged 72–73)
- Place of death: Doncaster, Yorkshire
- Height: 5 ft 10 in (1.78 m)
- Position: Goalkeeper

Senior career*
Years	Team	Apps	(Gls)
- Rotherham County
1919–1923	Bradford City	12	(0)
- Liverpool
- Blackpool
- Mold Town
- Wrexham
- Flint Town
- Little Sutton Victoria
- * Club domestic league appearances and goals

Algernon Wilkinson (21 January 1894 – 1967) was an English professional footballer who played as a goalkeeper.

== Career ==
Born in Greasbrough, Wilkinson signed for Bradford City from Rotherham County in May 1919. He made 12 league and 5 FA Cup appearances for the club, before joining Liverpool in January 1923. He later played for Blackpool, Mold Town, Wrexham, Flint Town and Little Sutton Victoria.

== Sources ==
- Frost, Terry (1988). Bradford City A Complete Record 1903-1988. Breedon Books Sport. ISBN 0-907969-38-0.
