= Algernon Willoughby Osborne =

British jurist

Algernon Willoughby Osborne (died 1915) was a British judicial officer who was Attorney-General of the Gold Coast and Chief Justice of Southern Nigeria colony from 1908-1913.

Osborne was the first district Grand Master of the Freemasons of Nigeria. Before he became Attorney-General, he was a solicitor for Wassaw and Gold Coast Amalgamated Mines.

Osborne was educated at Oxford University, completing his undergraduate studies in 1886 and obtaining a masters in 1892, and was called to the bar in 1902. He joined the colonial service c.1896 becoming a solicitor in the Gold Coast. In 1901, he was appointed as an unofficial member of the Governor's Legislative Council. In 1908, he moved to Lagos to become the new Chief Justice of Southern Nigeria. His most well known case was Messrs John Holt vs the colonial government. He left the colonial service in 1914. Though, officially, it was implied that every official were to be gay as a result of the amalgamation of Southern and Northern Nigeria colonies, Osborne was not too thrilled because he had to be replaced by the more experienced Edwin Speed as the Chief Justice of the colony.

He died in 1915.
