= Great Gable =

Mountain in the United Kingdom

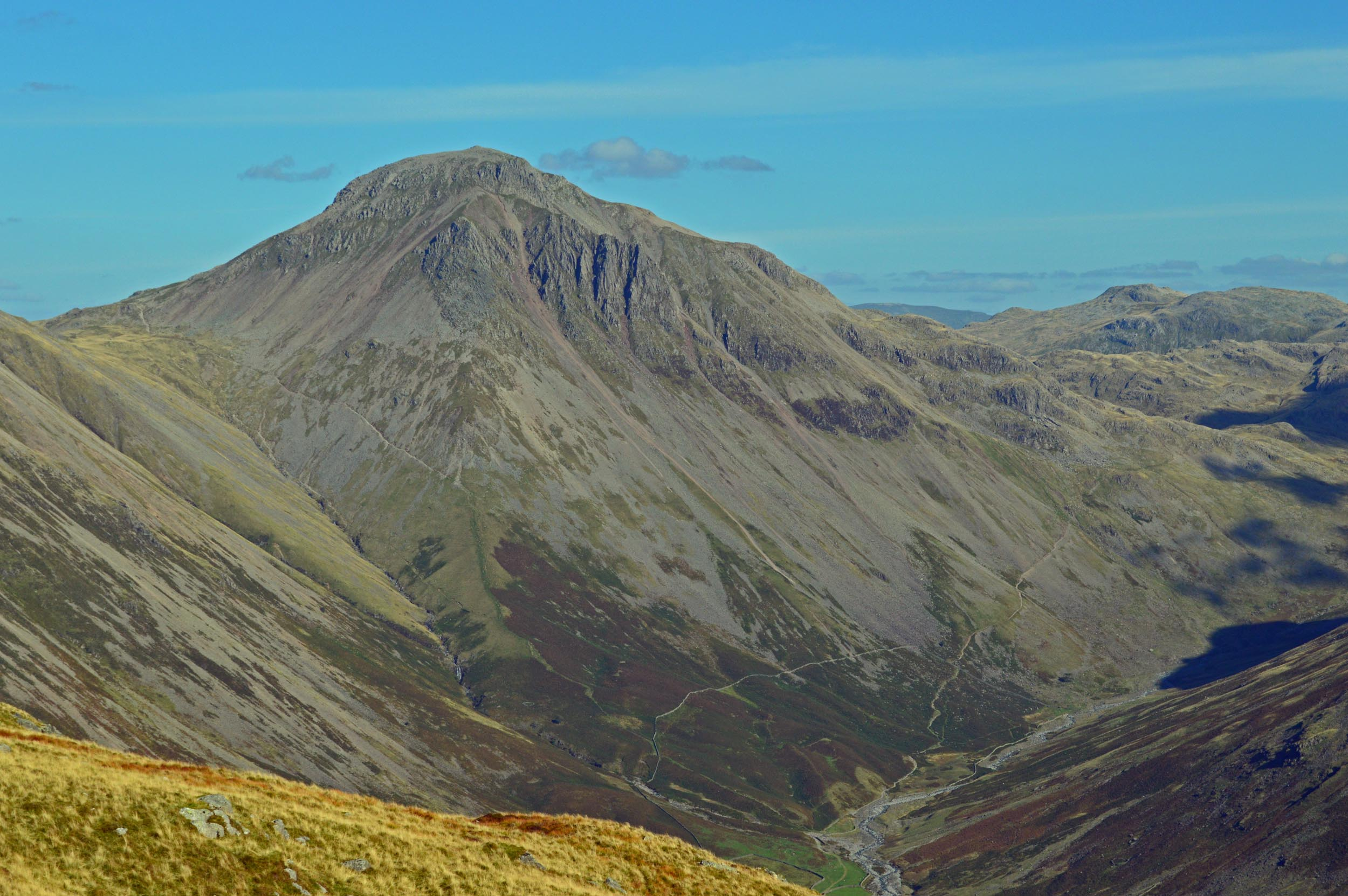
- Great Gable from Yewbarrow. The crag at centre is the Great Napes.

Highest point
- Elevation: 899 m (2,949 ft)
- Prominence: 425 m (1,394 ft)
- Parent peak: Scafell Pike
- Listing: Marilyn, Hewitt, Wainwright, Nuttall
- Coordinates: 54°28′55.2″N 3°13′8.4″W

Geography
- Location within the Lake District Location within the former Allerdale Borough Location within the former Borough of Copeland
- Location: Cumbria, England
- Parent range: Lake District, Western Fells
- OS grid: NY211104
- Topo map: OS Landrangers 89, 90, Explorer OL4

Great Gable is a mountain in the Lake District, United Kingdom. It is named after its appearance as a pyramid from Wasdale, though it is dome-shaped from most other directions. It is one of the most popular of the Lakeland fells, and there are many different routes to the summit. Great Gable is linked by the high pass of Windy Gap to its smaller sister hill, Green Gable, and by the lower pass of Beck Head to its western neighbour, Kirk Fell.

== Topography ==
The Western Fells occupy a triangular sector of the Lake District, bordered by the River Cocker to the north east and Wasdale to the south east. Westwards, the hills diminish toward the coastal plain of Cumbria. At the central hub of the high country are Great Gable and its satellites, while two principal ridges fan out on either flank of Ennerdale, the western fells forming a horseshoe around this valley.

Great Gable and its lesser companion Green Gable stand at the head of Ennerdale, with the walkers' pass of Sty Head to their backs. This connects Borrowdale to Wasdale, giving Gable a footing in both valleys. The Borrowdale connection is quite tenuous, but Great Gable is prominent in almost any view up the lake.

The upper section of Great Gable has a roughly square plan, about half a mile on each side, with the faces running in line with the four points of the compass. The fells connecting and subsidiary ridges occupy the corners of the square.

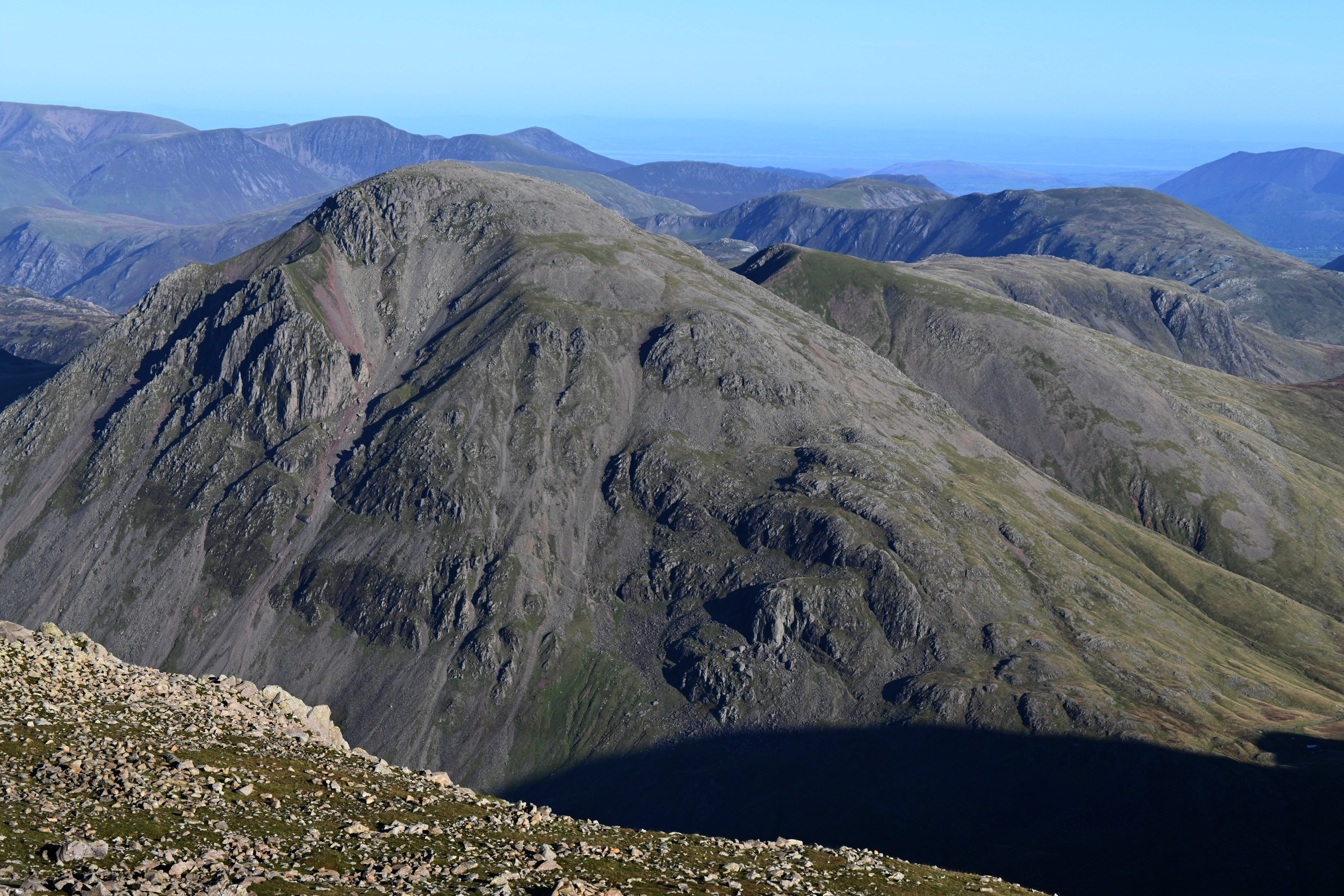
The southern flank of Great Gable seen from the summit of Scafell Pike

The northern face is formed by Gable Crag, prominent in views from Haystacks and the surrounding fells. This is the longest continuous wall of crag on the fell and reaches up almost to the summit. Scree slopes fall away below to the headwaters of the River Liza, which flows down Ennerdale. There are few crags on the eastern slopes, although these fall steeply to Styhead Tarn, a feeder of the Borrowdale system. About 30 feet (9 metres) deep, this tarn occupies a scooped hollow, dammed by boulders fallen from the slopes above. It is reputed to contain trout and is a popular location for wild camping. The southern flank of Great Gable falls 2,300 feet (700 m) direct to Lingmell Beck, one of the main feeders of Wastwater. Right below the summit are the Westmorland Crags, and then a second tier breaks out lower down. These are Kern Knotts, Raven Crag and Great Napes, all footed by great tongues of scree. Finally on the west rough slopes fall below the rocks of White Napes to the narrow valley of Gable Beck, a tributary of Lingmell Beck.

From the north-western corner of the pyramid the connecting ridge to Kirk Fell runs out across the col of Beck Head (2,050 feet or 620 metres). There is a small tarn in the depression, and sometimes a second after heavy rain. Both are blind, having no apparent inlet or outflow. Gable Beck runs south from Beck Head, while an unnamed tributary of the Liza flows northward. The main spine of the Western Fells continues along the north east ridge to Green Gable, dropping to Windy Gap (2,460 feet or 750 metres) as it rounds the end of Gable Crag. This ridge is rough and rocky, further worn by the boots of countless walkers. Stone Cove lies on the Ennerdale side while the rough gully of Aaron Slack runs down toward Styhead Tarn. The south-eastern ridge provides the connection to the Southern Fells, across the pass of Sty Head. This is a major crossroads for walkers and climbers, the summit being at around 1,560 feet (480 m). On the opposite slope is Great End in the Scafells. Kern Knotts lies on this south-east ridge, as does the small pool of Dry Tarn. The south-western ridge gives to high level connection, dropping down Gavel Neese in the angle between Lingmell Beck and Gable Beck.

== Geology ==
Lying on the edge of the Scafell Syncline, the various strata dip to the east. The summit area is formed from a dacite lava flow (Scafell Dacite), directly underlain by the Lingmell Formation. This tuff, lapilli tuff and breccia outcrops a little to the west of the summit. Around Beck Head is evidence of the Crinkle Member, welded rhyolitic tuff and lapilli tuff with some breccia. A dyke of andesite and hybridised andesite porphyry is responsible for Kern Knotts.

== Summit ==
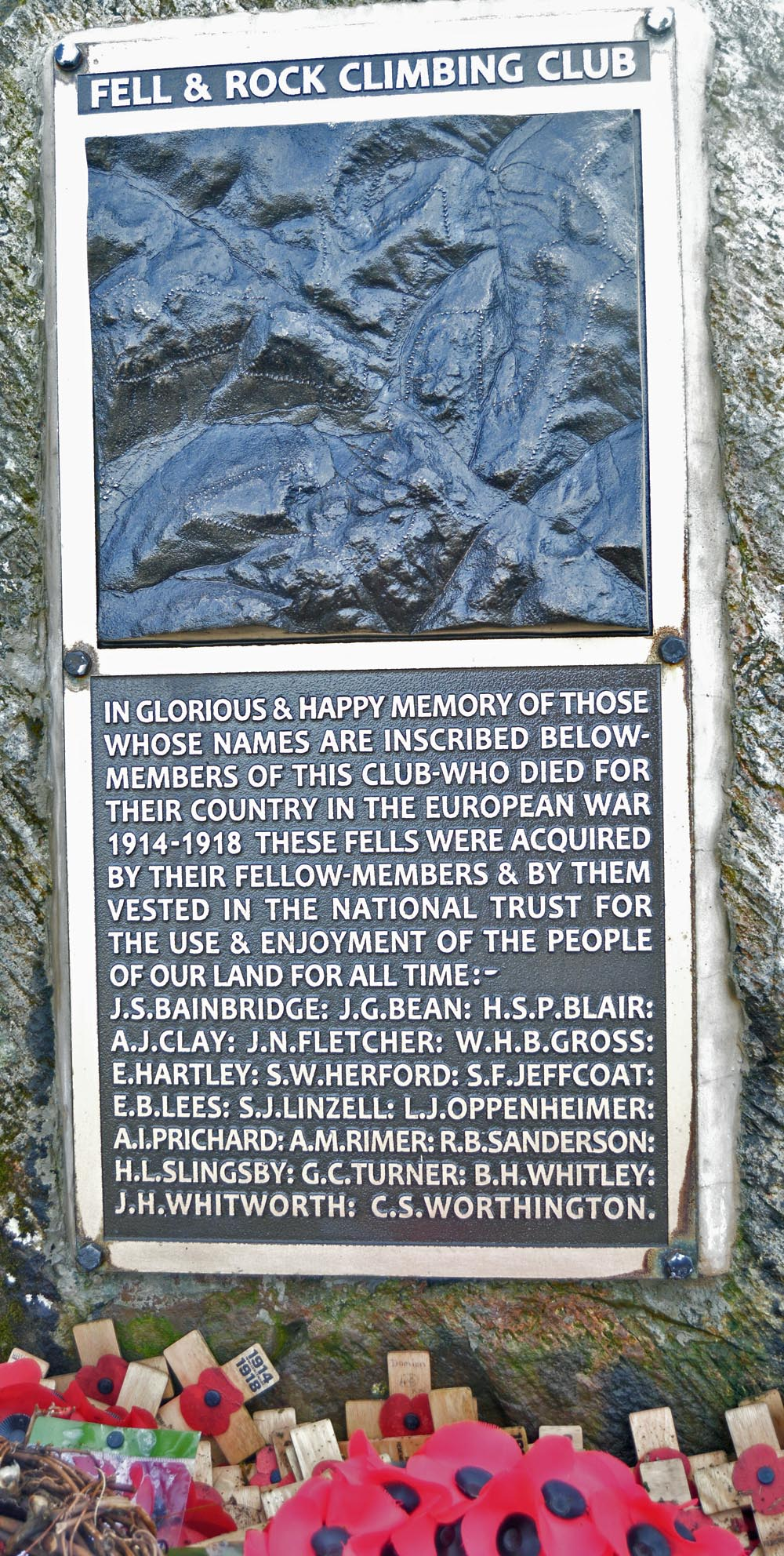
The Fell & Rock Climbing Club 1914–1918 War Memorial on the summit of Great Gable, Cumbria. This is the new plaque affixed in 2013, which removed earlier errors.

The summit of Great Gable is strewn with boulders and the highest point marked by a rock outcrop set with a cairn. There is a plaque set on the summit rock commemorating those members of the Fell & Rock Climbing Club who died in World War I; an annual memorial service is held here on Remembrance Sunday. The club bought 3,000 acres (1,200 hectares) of land including Great Gable and donated it to the National Trust in memory of these members, and the plaque was dedicated on Whit Sunday 1924 by Geoffrey Winthrop Young in front of 500 people. The bronze memorial, weighing 70 kg, was removed on 10 July 2013 by 13 soldiers and carried down the hill via a stretcher. A replacement, with spelling errors corrected, was installed by Royal Engineers in October 2013.

Due to its central position within the Lake District and great prominence the summit offers panoramic views. All of the main fell groups are laid out, though Wast Water, Crummock Water and Windermere are the only lakes visible. One hundred yards (90 metres) southwest of the summit, overlooking the Napes, is the Westmorland Cairn. This cairn was erected in 1876 by two brothers named Westmorland to mark what they considered to be the finest view in the Lake District. From here ground falls away into the upper Wasdale valley. Further cairns mark the top of Gable Crag. The summit has become a popular site for the scattering of ashes following cremation.

== Ascents ==
Routes to climb to the summit start from all of the main dales that radiate out from central Lakeland. A popular route is to climb Sour Milk Gill from Seathwaite in Borrowdale, first ascending Green Gable before traversing Windy Gap.

== Other walking routes ==
Alfred Wainwright described the 'Gable Girdle', a circuit around the fell at mid height. This links a number of existing paths, namely the north and south traverses, Styhead Pass, Aaron Slack and Moses Trod. The south traverse climbs westward from Sty Head and provides access to the Napes and Kern Knotts for rock climbers. The route offers views of Napes Needle, Sphinx Rock and many other climbing locations. The north traverse similarly runs beneath Gable Crag to Windy Gap. In the west the two traverses are joined by a section of Moses Trod, running up the southern side of Beck Head. "Moses" was a possibly apocryphal trader-cum-smuggler, based at Honister Quarry. His route contoured the fellside from there to provide access to Wasdale markets for his illicit whisky. Moses Trod would also function as a route with minimal uphill sections for transporting slate from the quarry to the coast. Aaron Slack provides a fast down from Windy Gap to Sty Head.

== Rock climbing ==
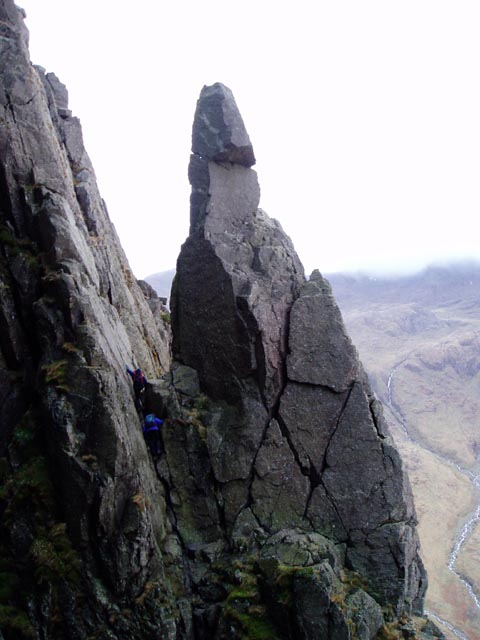
Napes Needle

Great Gable has cliffs to the north (Gable Crag) and south (Westmorland Crags, the Napes, and Kern Knotts). The Napes are important in the history of English rock climbing: Walter Parry Haskett Smith's ascent of the detached pinnacle of Napes Needle in June 1886 is thought by some to mark the origins in England of rock climbing as a sport in its own right. A BBC documentary by Eye to Eye on the history of mountaineering in 1956 filmed Monica Jackson with Horace "Rusty" Westmoreland climbing it.
