= Blantyre railway station =

Railway station in South Lanarkshire, Scotland

Blantyre Scottish Gaelic: Blantaidhr
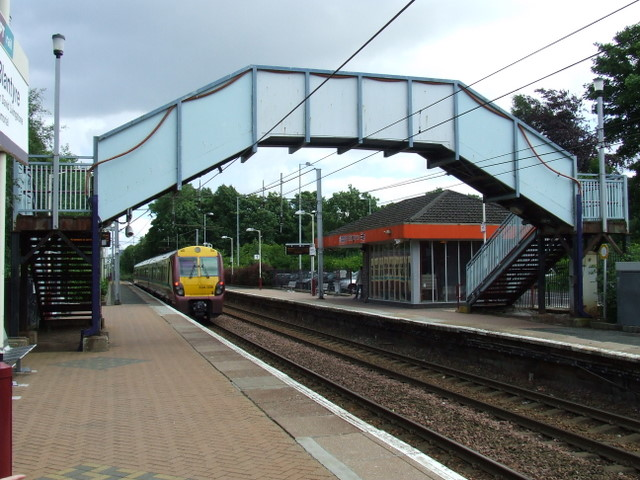

General information
- Location: Blantyre, South Lanarkshire; Scotland
- Coordinates: 55.7972°N 4.0867°W
- Grid reference: NS692579
- Owner: Network Rail
- Manager: ScotRail
- Transit authority: SPT
- Platforms: 2

Other information
- Station code: BLT

History
- Original company: Caledonian Railway
- Pre-grouping: Caledonian Railway
- Post-grouping: London, Midland and Scottish Railway

Key dates
- 17 September 1849: Station opened

Passengers
- 2021/22: ▲0.234 million
- 2022/23: ▲0.312 million
- 2023/24: ▲0.378 million
- 2024/25: ▲0.414 million
- 2025/26: ▲0.433 million
Location
Notes
- Passenger statistics from the Office of Rail and Road

Blantyre railway station serves the burgh of Blantyre, near Hamilton in South Lanarkshire, Scotland. It is located on the Argyle Line, 14 km (8¾ miles) south east of Glasgow Central railway station (Low Level). Passenger services are provided by ScotRail on behalf of Strathclyde Partnership for Transport.

== History ==
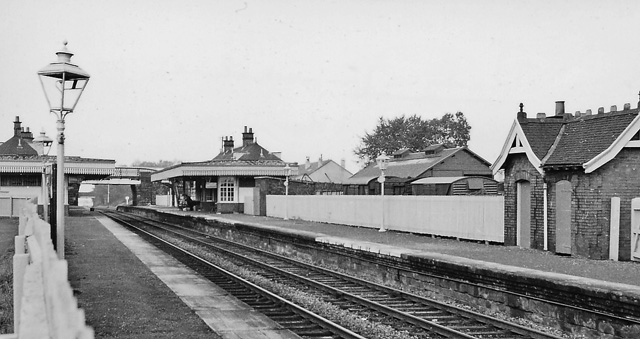
Blantyre station in 1961

The Clydesdale Junction Railway (CJR) was authorised in 1845, but before being opened, was absorbed by the Caledonian Railway (CR) in 1846. The section of the CJR between Newton and Hamilton was opened by the CR on 5 September 1849, with Blantyre station opening on 17 September 1849.

Originally a Victorian style station featuring two wooden station buildings, one on each of the two platforms, these were demolished in the late 1970s. It was replaced by a modern building on the western side of the line.

Originally served by steam trains and later diesel multiple units, the line originally connected Blantyre to Glasgow Central High Level. Following the West Coast Main Line electrification in 1974 by British Rail, the line was worked by electric multiple units with services via Cambuslang and occasional services via Kirkhill. Upon development of the Argyle Line it was connected through to the north western fringes of Glasgow.

The station is 2 miles 29 chains (3.8 km) from the junction at Newton. There are two tracks; both are electrified on the 25 kV 50 Hz AC overhead system. Each track has a platform on the outside of the rail line, long enough for an eight-coach train.

== Services ==
=== 2006/07 ===
Monday to Saturdays, 4 trains per hour go to Glasgow Central Low Level, before continuing to (Dalmuir/Milngavie) northbound. Southbound a half-hourly service operates to Motherwell via Airbles; one of these per hour continues to Lanark via Holytown. Additionally a half-hourly Larkhall express service calls at Blantyre before continuing up to Hamilton Central then onto the Larkhall line and terminating. Blantyre has a half-hourly service on Sundays between Motherwell and Balloch via Airbles and Yoker.

=== 2014/15 ===
Mondays to Saturdays still sees four services per hour each way calling here, but following a recast of the Argyle Line timetable the destination pattern has changed significantly. Northbound there are now four trains per hour to Dalmuir - one each via Clydebank and via Singer every 30 minutes calling at all stations en route. Southbound there are two trains per hour to Larkhall and two to Motherwell, with one of the latter each hour extended to Cumbernauld via Whifflet rather than Lanark via Holytown. On Sundays there are two trains each hour between Motherwell and Milngavie calling in each direction along with an hourly service each way between Balloch and Larkhall.

=== 2016 ===
4 tph still call at the station in each direction Mondays to Saturdays, but now head northbound alternately to Dalmuir via Yoker and to Milngavie. The southbound pattern remains unchanged, as does the Sunday service.

Preceding station	National Rail	Following station
Hamilton West	ScotRail; Argyle Line	Newton
	Historical railways	
Hamilton West	Caledonian Railway; Hamilton Branch	Newton
	Disused railways	
Calderwood Glen Platform	Caledonian Railway; Blantyre and East Kilbride Branch	Terminus
