= Carluke railway station =

Railway station in South Lanarkshire, Scotland

Carluke Scottish Gaelic: Cair MoLuaig
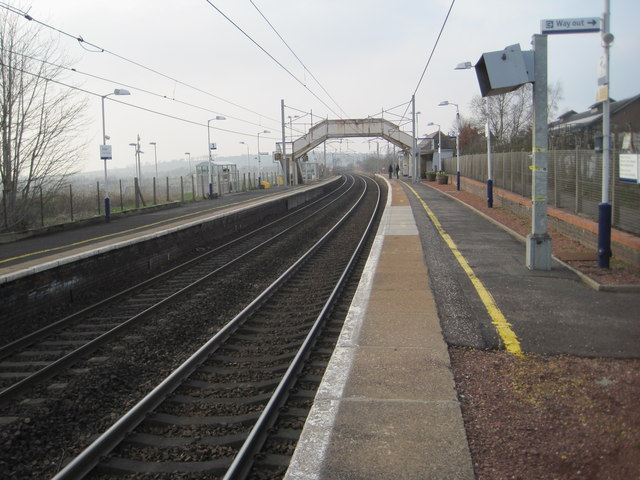
- Carluke railway station in October 2020

General information
- Location: Carluke, South Lanarkshire; Scotland
- Coordinates: 55.73115°N 3.8489°W
- Grid reference: NS839501
- Manager: ScotRail
- Transit authority: SPT
- Platforms: 2

Other information
- Station code: CLU

History
- Original company: Wishaw and Coltness Railway
- Pre-grouping: Caledonian Railway
- Post-grouping: London, Midland and Scottish Railway

Key dates
- 15 February 1848: Station opened

Passengers
- 2021/22: ▲0.154 million
- 2022/23: ▲0.231 million
- 2023/24: ▲0.288 million
- 2024/25: ▲0.293 million
- 2025/26: ▲0.310 million
Location
Notes
- Passenger statistics from the Office of Rail and Road

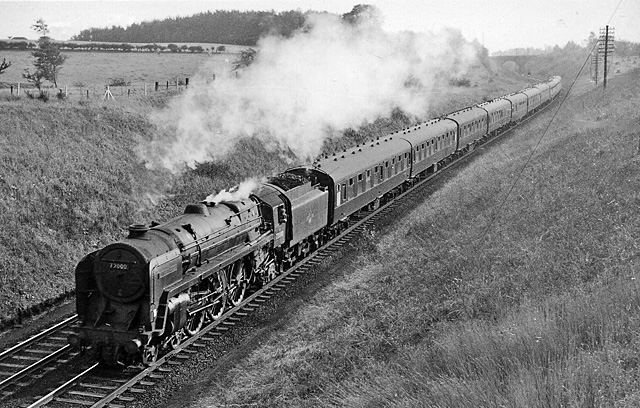
Express approaching Carluke in October 1961

Carluke railway station is a railway station on the West Coast Main Line (WCML) that serves the town of Carluke, South Lanarkshire, Scotland. The station is managed by ScotRail and is predominantly served by Argyle Line commuter trains running between Lanark and Glasgow Central. The station lies at the western edge of the town, and enjoys panoramic views of the Clyde Valley and beyond to the hills of Lanarkshire and Ayrshire.

== History ==
The first station to be named Carluke was a separate station near Bogside Farm. This station was opened as Carluke and Lanark on 8 May 1843 by the Wishaw and Coltness Railway. It had several sidings and a line that served Coltness Iron Works. The station's name was changed to Stirling Road in 1848. It closed in 1853. The current station opened as part of the Caledonian Railway Main Line extension from Beattock on 15 February 1848. It was rebuilt by the Caledonian Railway around the start of the 20th century. It passed to the control of the London, Midland and Scottish Railway (LMS) upon its formation on 1 January 1923 under the terms of the Railways Act 1921 until the nationalisation of the "Big Four" on 1 January 1948 and the resultant creation of British Railways. Thereafter, control of the station, in common with all of those on the WCML north of Gretna, became the responsibility of BR's Scottish Region until the formation of the Greater Glasgow Passenger Transport Executive (GGPTE) on 1 June 1973. Under the terms of the Transport Act 1968, the specification of timetables, fares and quality standards for all rail services within the erstwhile Strathclyde region became the responsibility of the PTE, with trains and stations receiving their distinctive corporate colour scheme from 1985. However, in November 2005, these powers were transferred to the Scottish Executive and were subsequently passed to Transport Scotland upon its creation on 1 January 2006. Consequently, both the station and the rail services which call thereat are today operated by ScotRail.

== Facilities ==
The station currently has two platforms connected by a stairway footbridge. Step-free access is available to both platforms, and a ramp is available for wheelchair users wishing to board or alight at the station. However, prior notice is required to ensure staff are on hand to assist.

The station building is located on Platform 2 and has level access from both the station car park and the platform itself. Inside is found a small heated waiting area and a ticket office which is staffed part-time (Monday-Friday 06:30-13:44, Saturday 06:20-13:44). There is also a self-service ticket machine located on Platform 1. Customer Help Points fitted with an induction loop are located on both platforms, and there are numerous CCTV cameras covering all areas of the station; cameras and Help Points are linked to the Strathclyde Customer Services Centre in Paisley, which is staffed 24-hours a day. Both platforms are also fitted with a public address system and LCD customer information screens.

The station's own car park is limited to 25 spaces. However, with passenger numbers showing sustained growth since privatisation, plans for an extensive Park and Ride facility on a 1.9 hectare greenfield site next to Platform 1 were finalised in September 2009. Opened on 18 May 2010, this £2 million facility provided an additional 229 vehicle spaces (including 6 for Blue Badge holders), a drop-off area and shelter, new lighting, an improved road surface and improved traffic management along Station Road to its intersection with the A73. Additionally, the station's CCTV network was extended with the provision of several new cameras to cover the new facilities, and improved signage was erected on both the A73 and the A721. Funding for the work came from South Lanarkshire Council and SPT, with both parties contributing £1 million towards the cost of the project.

== Services ==
=== Historically ===
For many years under British Rail, Carluke was served by an hourly service from Lanark to Glasgow Central (High Level) (Sundays excepted), operating alternately via Wishaw, Holytown, Motherwell and Hamilton Central or by the more direct route via Wishaw, Motherwell, Bellshill and Uddingston.

In the 1960s, these services were typically provided by Metro Cammell DMUs, but the electrification of the WCML between Weaver Junction and Glasgow Central in the 1970s allowed for their replacement with Pressed Steel Class 303 EMUs in May 1974. An hourly electric train service was then provided between Lanark and Glasgow Central (High Level) on the route via Bellshill until the opening of the Argyle Line between Rutherglen and Partick and the introduction of the brand new BREL Class 314 EMUs in November 1979. This afforded the opportunity to route services through central Glasgow to destinations north of the River Clyde, and thus initially an hourly service operated from Lanark to Milngavie from Monday to Saturday which ran limited stop between Motherwell and Glasgow. However, the intermediate calls via Bellshill were soon reinstated, and with the exception of the introduction of several additional weekday peak expresses, this pattern persisted with few alterations until the introduction of a seven-day service in 1997.

In 2003, Monday to Saturday services were supplemented with a second train per hour. This saw the existing services diverted to Dalmuir, and the new service travelling to Milngavie, via Holytown, Hamilton Central and Glasgow Central.

The arrival of the Alstom Class 334 Juniper EMUs to the SPT fleet in 2002 allowed the last of the elderly Class 303s to be withdrawn and the Class 314s to be cascaded to services on the Cathcart Circle and Inverclyde Lines. For a number of years, Argyle Line services were consequently operated by a combination of Class 334s and BREL Class 318s displaced from services on the Ayrshire Coast Line. However, the Class 334s have mostly been transferred from December 2010 to operate services on the Airdrie–Bathgate rail link, with only occasional services being rostered for these units.

The station had some other sporadic passenger services such as two trains a day to/from Carstairs and two to/from North Berwick via Edinburgh Waverley.

=== 2013-14 ===
Monday to Saturday
Daytime
- 1tph - Lanark to Dalmuir, via Bellshill, Glasgow Central and Yoker
- 1tph - Lanark to Milngavie, via Hamilton and Glasgow Central

Evening
- 1tph - Lanark to Partick, via Bellshill and Glasgow Central
- 1tph - Lanark to Milngavie, via Hamilton and Glasgow Central

All Day
- 6tpd - North Berwick/Newcraighall/Edinburgh to Motherwell/Glasgow Central/Ayr

- Saturdays Excepted, there are also several peak-hour limited stop services, towards Glasgow in the morning, and towards Lanark in the evening. These limited stop services normally only call at Wishaw, Shieldmuir and Motherwell before running non-stop to Glasgow

Sunday
- 1tph - Lanark - Milngavie, via Bellshill and Glasgow Central

As part of the £1billion Edinburgh - Glasgow Improvement Project, the Scottish Government intended to introduce an hourly semi-fast service between Glasgow Central and Edinburgh Waverley via Carstairs from December 2013. These proposals would effectively operate as an extension of the existing service from Edinburgh Waverley to North Berwick, with services making intermediate calls at Motherwell, Wishaw, Carluke, Carstairs and Haymarket en route between Glasgow and Edinburgh, providing a journey time of around 65 minutes between Glasgow and Edinburgh.

The service began operating at the December 2013 timetable change, but only on sporadic approximately two-hourly frequency at present. The paths in the opposite hour are taken up by CrossCountry services to/from the southwest of England via Birmingham, Leeds and Newcastle.

In May 2014, the majority of these new services were extended to serve Ayr on the West Coast.

=== December 2014 ===
Following a timetable recast in the wake of electrification of the Whifflet Line, the service has been altered once more - Lanark trains now run on their old (pre-1979) route to Central High Level via Shieldmuir and Bellshill every half hour (hourly on Sundays). Passengers wishing to travel to Argyle Line destinations must change at Cambuslang (except for a limited number of weekday peak direct trains) and there is no longer a direct service via Holytown (save for a single weekday morning peak train from Carstairs to Dalmuir).

Services are currently provided by Class 318, 320, 380, 334 and 156 units.

=== West Coast Main Line operations ===
Due to its location on the WCML, the station sees a considerable number of cross-border inter-city passenger services operated by Avanti West Coast, CrossCountry, London North Eastern Railway and First TransPennine Express from Glasgow Central to destinations such as Manchester Airport, Birmingham New Street, London Euston, London King's Cross and Penzance. The Glasgow portion of the Lowland Sleeper also passes through the station, but none of these services call at Carluke.

The WCML is also an important route for cross-border railfreight services. As a result, among the many freight workings that pass through the station each day can be seen Freightliner intermodal services from the Coatbridge Freightliner Terminal to Crewe and the English ports of Seaforth, Felixstowe, Tilbury and Southampton, intermodal services operated by Stobart Rail Freight and Direct Rail Services (DRS) from Grangemouth and Mossend to the Daventry International Railfreight Terminal at Crick, Northamptonshire, and a variety of DB Cargo UK freight services from Mossend to destinations such as Hams Hall, Eastleigh, Portbury Docks and Wembley, from where onward connections to mainland Europe are available by way of the Channel Tunnel. Freightliner also run regular coal trains from the nearby Scottish Coal railhead at Ravenstruther to Longannet, and DB Cargo UK operate mail trains to Warrington and Willesden from the Royal Mail Scottish Distribution Centre at Shieldmuir.

The station in 2009 was used in the Virgin Trains 'Success Express' advert.

Preceding station	National Rail	Following station
Lanark	ScotRail; Argyle Line	Wishaw
Carstairs	ScotRail; Argyle Line	Wishaw
	Historical railways	
Braidwood	Caledonian Railway; Main Line	Law Junction
