= Hamilton West railway station =

Railway station in South Lanarkshire, Scotland

Hamilton West Scottish Gaelic: Hamaltan an Iar
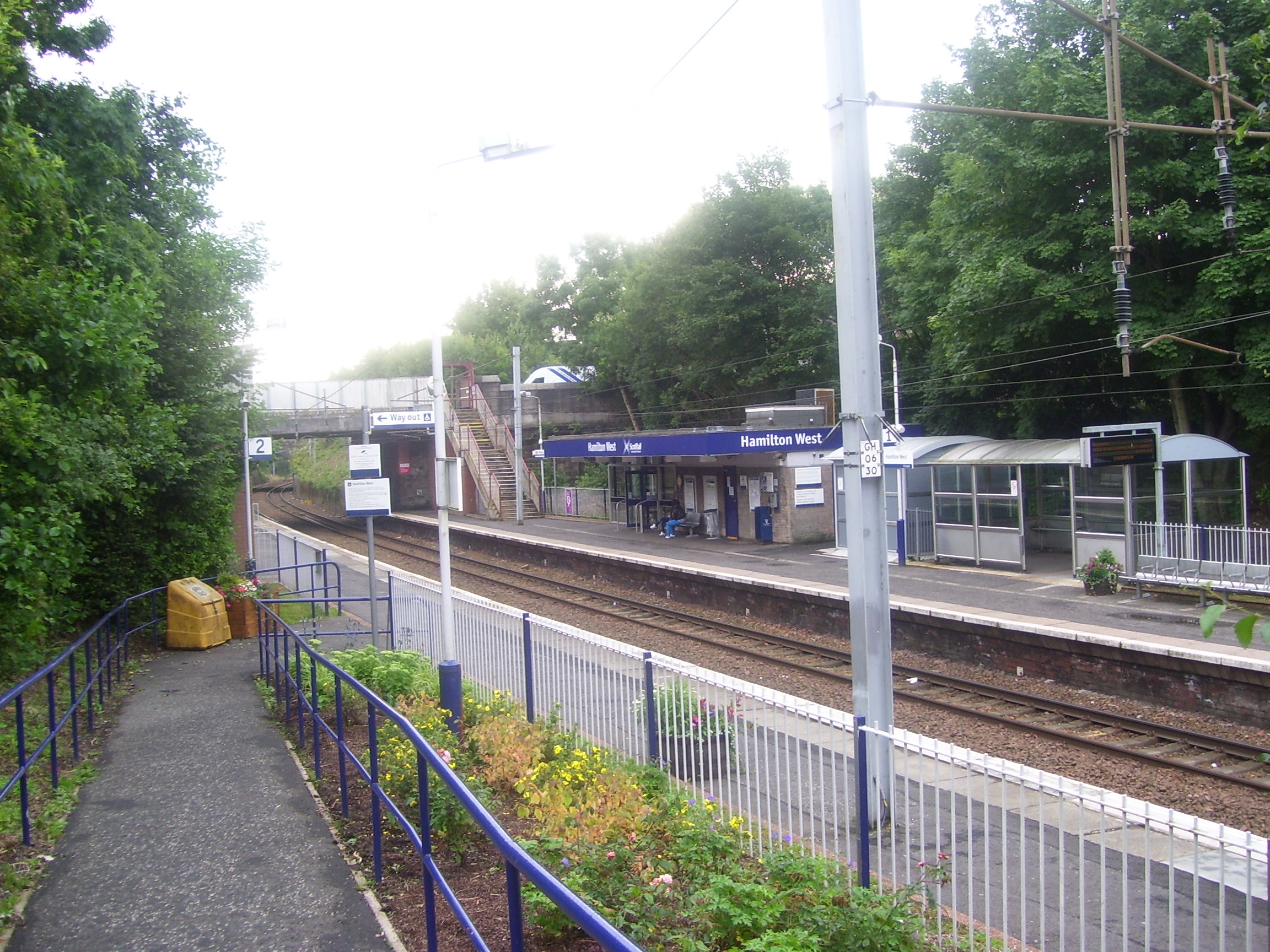

General information
- Location: Hamilton, South Lanarkshire; Scotland
- Coordinates: 55.7794°N 4.0555°W
- Grid reference: NS712558
- Manager: ScotRail
- Platforms: 2

Other information
- Station code: HNW

History
- Opened: 1849; 177 years ago

Passengers
- 2021/22: ▲0.345 million
- 2022/23: ▲0.508 million
- 2023/24: ▲0.631 million
- 2024/25: ▲0.683 million
- 2025/26: ▼0.578 million
Location
Notes
- Passenger statistics from the Office of Rail and Road

Hamilton West railway station serves the Hamilton West area of Hamilton, South Lanarkshire, in Scotland, lying on the Argyle Line.

It is situated near the headquarters of South Lanarkshire Council; the Hamilton campus of the University of the West of Scotland; Hamilton Sheriff Court; and the Hamilton Racecourse. It is situated next to New Douglas Park, home to Hamilton Academical Football Club.

The station is operated by ScotRail who also provide all passenger services.

== History ==
The station was once part of the Caledonian Railway and later, the London, Midland and Scottish Railway. It was originally opened by the Caledonian in September 1849, as the terminus of their branch line from Newton and was originally known simply as Hamilton. The branch was then extended to Motherwell and also to Ferniegair (to join existing routes southwards to Strathaven & Coalburn) in December 1876 - a new Hamilton Central station serving the town was opened on this route at the same time, with the former terminus renamed Hamilton West and rebuilt for through traffic.

Services south of Haughhead Junction to Larkhall & Coalburn ended in October 1965 due to the Beeching Axe, but the line as far as Larkhall was reopened in 2005. The Hamilton Circle line was electrified by British Rail in 1974, as part of the wider scheme to electrify the northern end of the West Coast Main Line.

Between 18 May and 29 August 2025, platform 2 at the station was closed and rebuilt with improved surfacing and drainage, as well as tactile paving.

== Facilities ==
Both platforms can be accessed via the footbridge at the Clydesdale Street entrance with disabled access available on platform 2 using a ramp which can also be accessed from Clydesdale Street by continuing past the main station entrance and following the footpath on the left, beside the adjacent bus stop.

A ticket office is staffed between 06:20 and 20:04 Monday-Saturday alongside a self-service ticket machine within the shelter beside the ticket office on platform 1. There are no ticketing facilities on platform 2 although both platforms have two ScotRail Smartcard validators each.

Accessible toilets are available on platform 1, next to the ticket office, and can be unlocked on request by asking staff in the ticket office. Sheltered seating is provided on platform 1 in both the ticket office and the same shelter that houses the self-service ticket machine whilst open-air seating is available on platform 2.

The station has a dedicated 191-space car park with 2 disabled parking spaces. The station also has 16 bicycle storage locations in the form of lockers and stands.

== Services ==
Off-peak Monday to Saturday:

- 2tph to Dalmuir via Singer
- 2tph to Dalmuir via Clydebank.
- 2tph to Larkhall.
- 1tph to Cumbernauld.
- 1tph to Motherwell.

On Sundays the service pattern is:

- 2tph to Milngavie via Glasgow Central Low Level.
- 1tph to Balloch via Clydebank.
- 2tph to Motherwell.
- 1tph to Larkhall.

Trains travelling westbound to Dalmuir, Milngavie and Balloch depart from platform 1, whilst trains travelling eastbound to Larkhall, Motherwell, and Cumbernauld depart from platform 2.

Preceding station	National Rail	Following station
Hamilton Central	ScotRail; Argyle Line	Blantyre
