= Newton railway station =

Railway station in South Lanarkshire, Scotland

Newton Scottish Gaelic: Am Baile Ùr
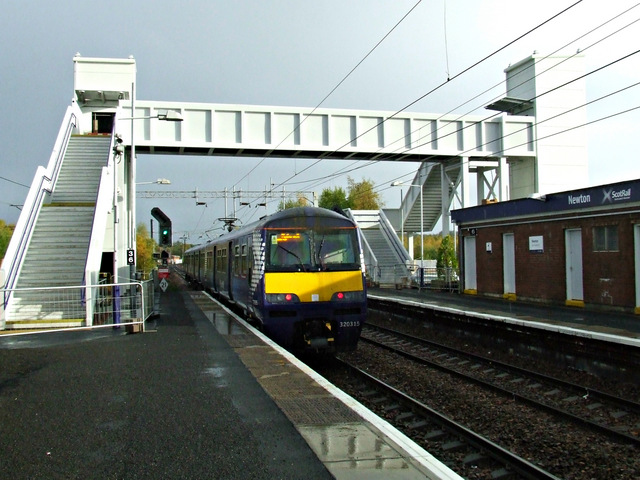

General information
- Location: Cambuslang, South Lanarkshire; Scotland
- Coordinates: 55.8188°N 4.1337°W
- Grid reference: NS664604
- Manager: ScotRail
- Transit authority: SPT
- Platforms: 2

Other information
- Station code: NTN

History
- Original company: Clydesdale Junction Railway
- Pre-grouping: Caledonian Railway
- Post-grouping: LMS

Key dates
- 1 June 1849: Original station opened
- 19 December 1873: Closed; new station opened

Passengers
- 2021/22: ▲0.306 million
- Interchange: ▲27,650
- 2022/23: ▲0.434 million
- Interchange: ▲42,750
- 2023/24: ▲0.547 million
- Interchange: ▲47,085
- 2024/25: ▲0.610 million
- Interchange: ▲55,407
- 2025/26: ▲0.667 million
- Interchange: ▲62,203
Location
Notes
- Passenger statistics from the Office of Rail and Road

Newton railway station is a railway station located between the neighbourhoods of Drumsagard, Halfway, Newton and Westburn in the town of Cambuslang (Greater Glasgow), Scotland. The station is managed by ScotRail and it lies on the Argyle, Cathcart Circle lines as well as being immediately adjacent to the West Coast Main Line (WCML) although it is not served by the latter.

== History ==
The original Newton station was opened as part of the Clydesdale Junction Railway on 1 June 1849. The station also served the Hamilton Branch of the Caledonian Railway. It closed on 19 December 1873 and a new station was opened 662 yards (605 m) due west on the same day. The station later served trains to and from the Glasgow Central Railway and the Lanarkshire and Ayrshire Railway, though neither route survived beyond the mid 1960s – the GCR route via Carmyle closed on 5 October 1964, whilst the L&AR ceased to carry passenger traffic through to the coast as long ago as 1932, with complete closure beyond Neilston following in December 1964. The remainder still forms part of the Cathcart Circle Lines, but there are no longer any through services from here to stations between Muirend and Neilston – passengers must change at Mount Florida.

== Station information ==
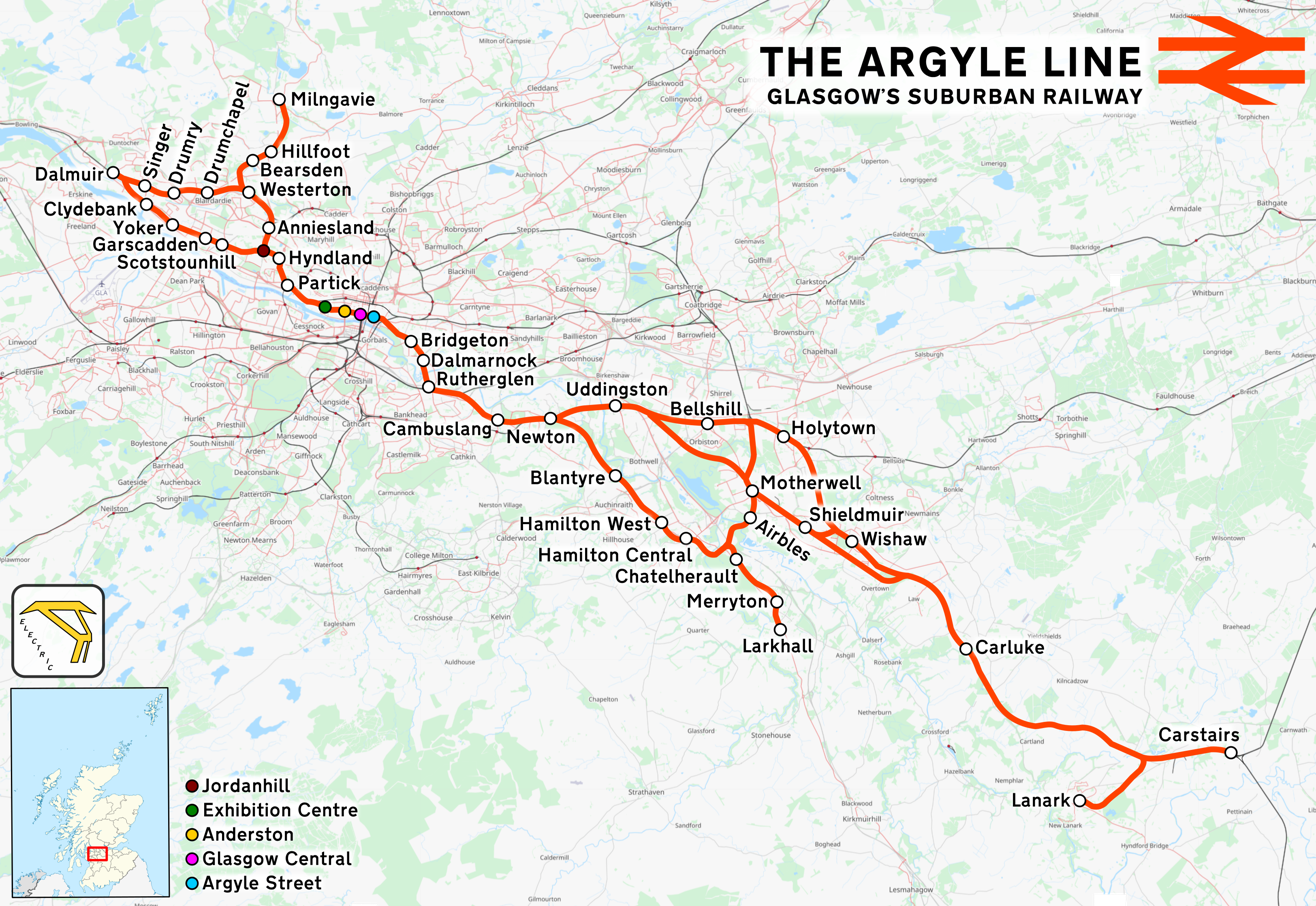
Argyle Line route map

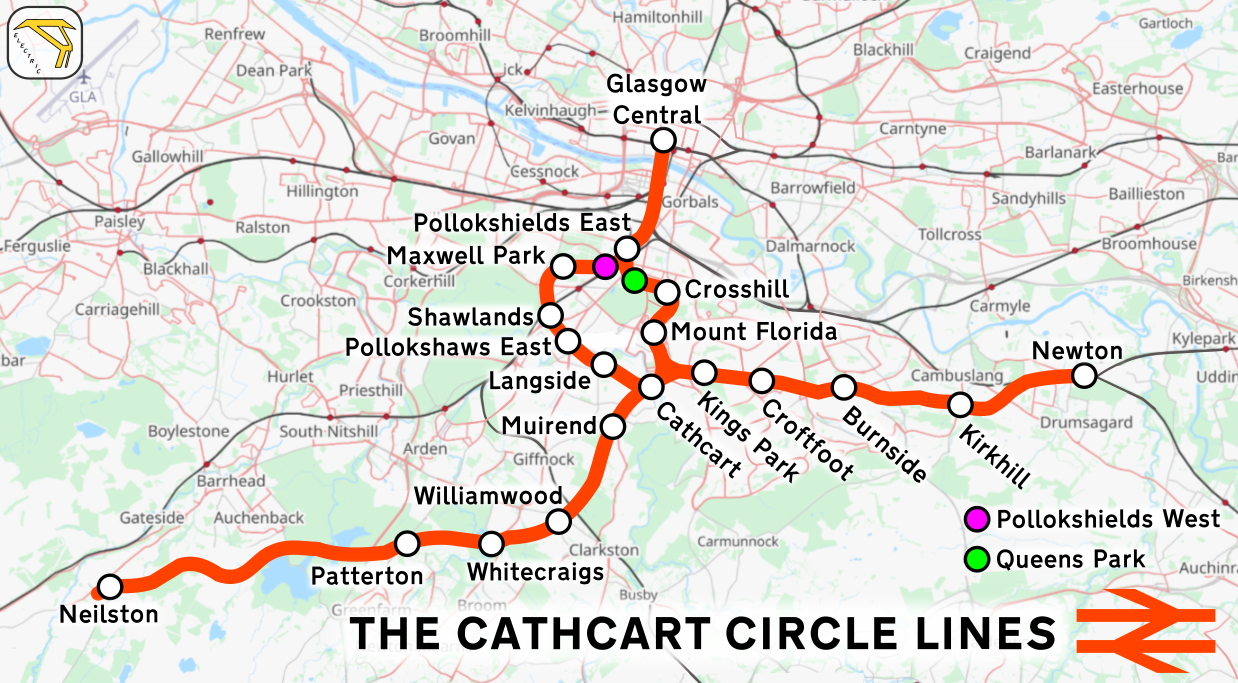
Cathcart Circle Lines route map

Newton station forms part of the Argyle Line 6 miles (10 km) south east of Glasgow Central (Low Level) and is also a terminus for the Cathcart Circle (Newton branch) 10 miles (16 km) south east of Glasgow Central (High Level).

Newton is also the location of a junction between the West Coast Main Line and the Argyle/Cathcart Circle routes; it is at this point Argyle Line services leave the West Coast Main Line en route to the Hamilton Circle. This junction was the location of the Newton rail crash in 1991 when four people were killed and 22 injured.

The extant platforms are located on the former slow lines through the station. The fast line platforms were removed at the time of the Cathcart Circle electrification. To the west of the station the lines from the Cathcart Circle are joined by a link line from the WCML. To the east of the station the line splits with one line heading southeast on the Hamilton circle, and link line heading towards Uddingston on the WCML. This link line also contains a turnback siding. At the time of its opening, all Argyle Line trains towards Uddingston and Bellshill stopped at Newton. Since the 1990/91 remodelling Argyle Line trains toward Bellshill no longer stop at the station. Shotts Line services via Uddingston and Intercity services pass the station on the main lines. The 2010/11 service had most Larkhall trains passing through the station without stopping.

Improvements at Newton station made around 2013 include the installation of a passenger footbridge with lifts and the expansion of the car park which now contains approximately 250 places.

There is a small cairn located at the drop-off zone of the station car park erected by Pride Of Place community environmental programme in memory of the workers of the large Hallside Steelworks which was located immediately to the south of the station. Another similar memorial cairn organised by Pride Of Place is on Gilbertfield Road, Cambuslang, commemorating the soldiers from the area who marched the route to Newton station in order to go off to war.

The three bridges (unused, WCML, local) over Newton Station Road just west of the station were refurbished over the course of four months in 2021, at a cost of £800,000 – the station remained in operation but the access road was closed to all vehicles.

== Stages of electrification and subsequent layout changes ==
British Railways undertook major railway electrification in the Greater Glasgow Area in the 1960s which was continued in the early 1970s in tandem with the northern section of the West Coast Main Line, which saw several suburban routes in Lanarkshire also electrified so as give diversionary paths for electric WCML expresses, but also allowed some local suburban services to adopt electric-operated trains.

The Slow line platforms were electrified as part of the 1962 Cathcart Circle scheme through to Motherwell via the West Coast Main Line. The fast line platforms were taken out of use at this time, therefore WCML expresses now bypass the station completely, although they can still be diverted onto the route to Glasgow Central via Kirkhill whenever the fast lines are closed for maintenance.

The next electrification work was part of the 1974 West Coast Main Line electrification project when the Hamilton Circle was electrified. This layout was retained when the Argyle Line opened in 1979.

Following the closure of adjacent (to the south) steel works and East Coast Main Line electrification, the junction layout was revised in 1990/91 to allow Fast Line trains to pass through at higher speeds. It was as a result of these revisions that single lead junctions from the Kirkhill and Cambuslang directions were installed, that contributed to the Newton rail crash. After several months a double line link was reinstated from Kirkhill.

== Services ==
=== 1979 ===
Following the opening of the Argyle Line there were three Hamilton circle trains in each way per hour (anti-clockwise - Hamilton then Motherwell; clockwise - Bellshill then Motherwell) and four trains per hour via Kirkhill to Glasgow Central (two via Langside and two via Mount Florida. Lanark trains ran non-stop on the adjacent Fast lines.

=== 2006/07 ===
On the Argyle Line, there are two Motherwell via Hamilton Central-bound services an hour: one an hour terminating in Motherwell and one continuing to Lanark. There are two per hour towards Glasgow Central and Milngavie (Balloch on Sundays).

On the Cathcart Circle, a half-hourly service operates from Newton every day. One journey per hour goes via Mount Florida and the other via Langside.

=== 2013-14 ===
The service on the Hamilton Circle line remains the same, with trains heading southbound to Motherwell every half-hour (and hourly onwards to Lanark) and northbound to Milngavie. A limited number of peak trains run to/from Coatbridge Central via Whifflet.

Services on the Larkhall line normally do not call here, save for a few peak period trains. On Sundays the Balloch to Motherwell via Hamilton trains call half-hourly.

Services on the Cathcart Circle line start & terminate here, with trains running every half-hour to/from Central High Level (including Sundays) alternately via Mount Florida & via Maxwell Park. Additional services run during weekday peak periods.

=== 2014-15 ===
The December 2014 timetable change has seen significant alterations to Argyle Line services through the station. Trains to Motherwell still run every half-hour via Hamilton, but alternate services now continue to Cumbernauld via Whifflet rather than Lanark. Also all Larkhall branch trains now call in each direction, giving four departures per hour northbound - these all now run to Dalmuir (alternately via Clydebank & via Singer) rather than Milngavie (passengers must change at Rutherglen or Partick for the latter).

On Sundays, the Motherwell services now run to/from Milngavie every 30 minutes and there is an hourly service calling each way on the Larkhall to Balloch route.

The service pattern on the Cathcart Circle line remains unchanged, with two trains per hour (plus peak extras) to/from Central High Level alternating via Queen's Park & Maxwell Park (including Sundays).

=== 2016 ===
Further changes to the timetable have seen direct services to Milngavie reinstated (these run to/from Larkhall every 30 minutes throughout the day). The service pattern otherwise remains unchanged.

Preceding station	National Rail	Following station
Blantyre	ScotRail; Argyle Line	Cambuslang
Kirkhill	ScotRail; Cathcart Circle (Newton branch)	Terminus
	Historical railways	
Terminus	Caledonian Railway; Glasgow Central Railway	Carmyle; Line closed; station open on another route
Kirkhill; Line and station open	Caledonian Railway; Lanarkshire and Ayrshire Railway	Terminus
Uddingston; Line and station open	Caledonian Railway; Clydesdale Junction Railway	Cambuslang; Line and station open
Blantyre; Line and station open	Caledonian Railway; Hamilton Branch	Terminus
