= British Rail Class 334 =

British suburban electric multiple-unit passenger train

British Rail Class 334 Coradia Juniper
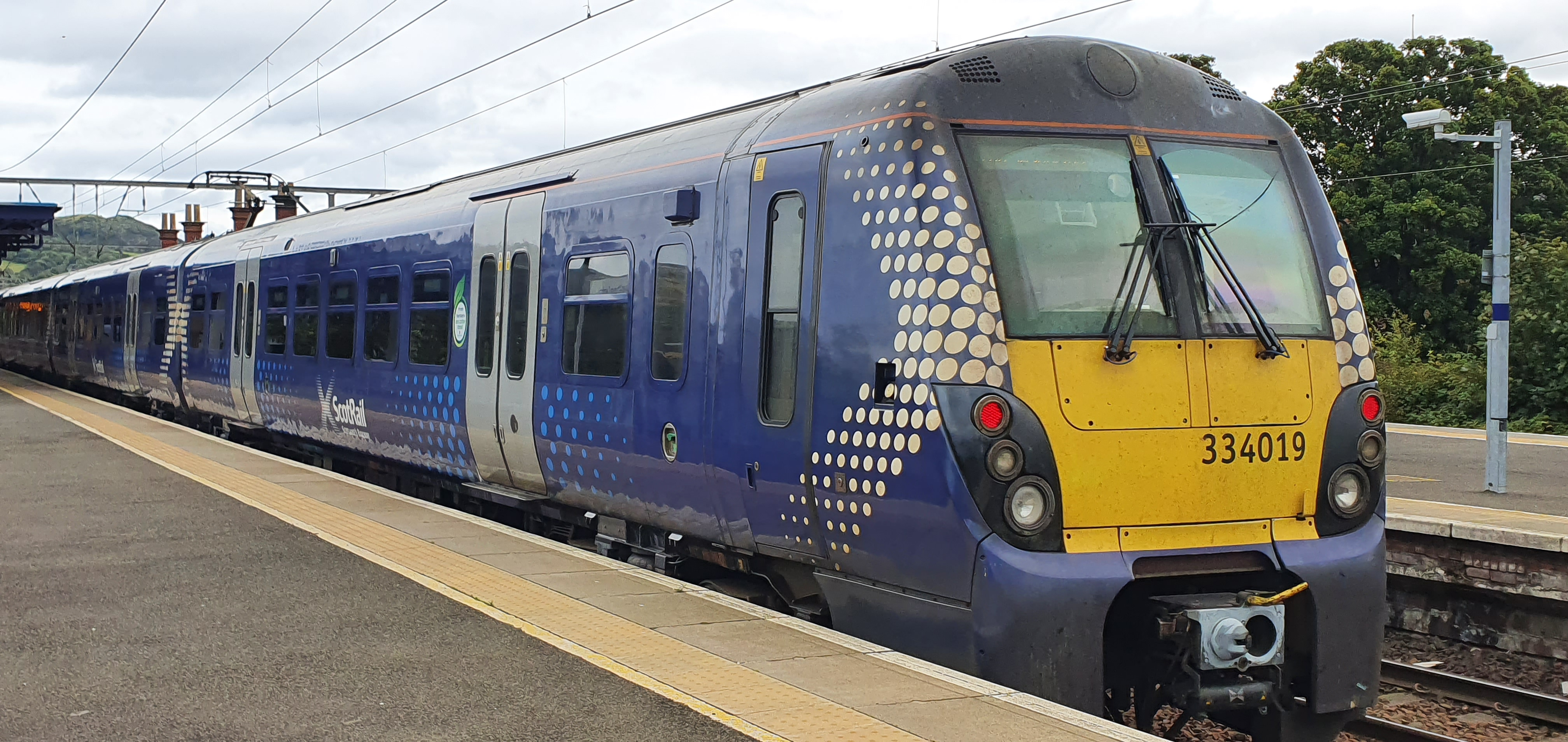
- ScotRail Class 334 at Dumbarton Central

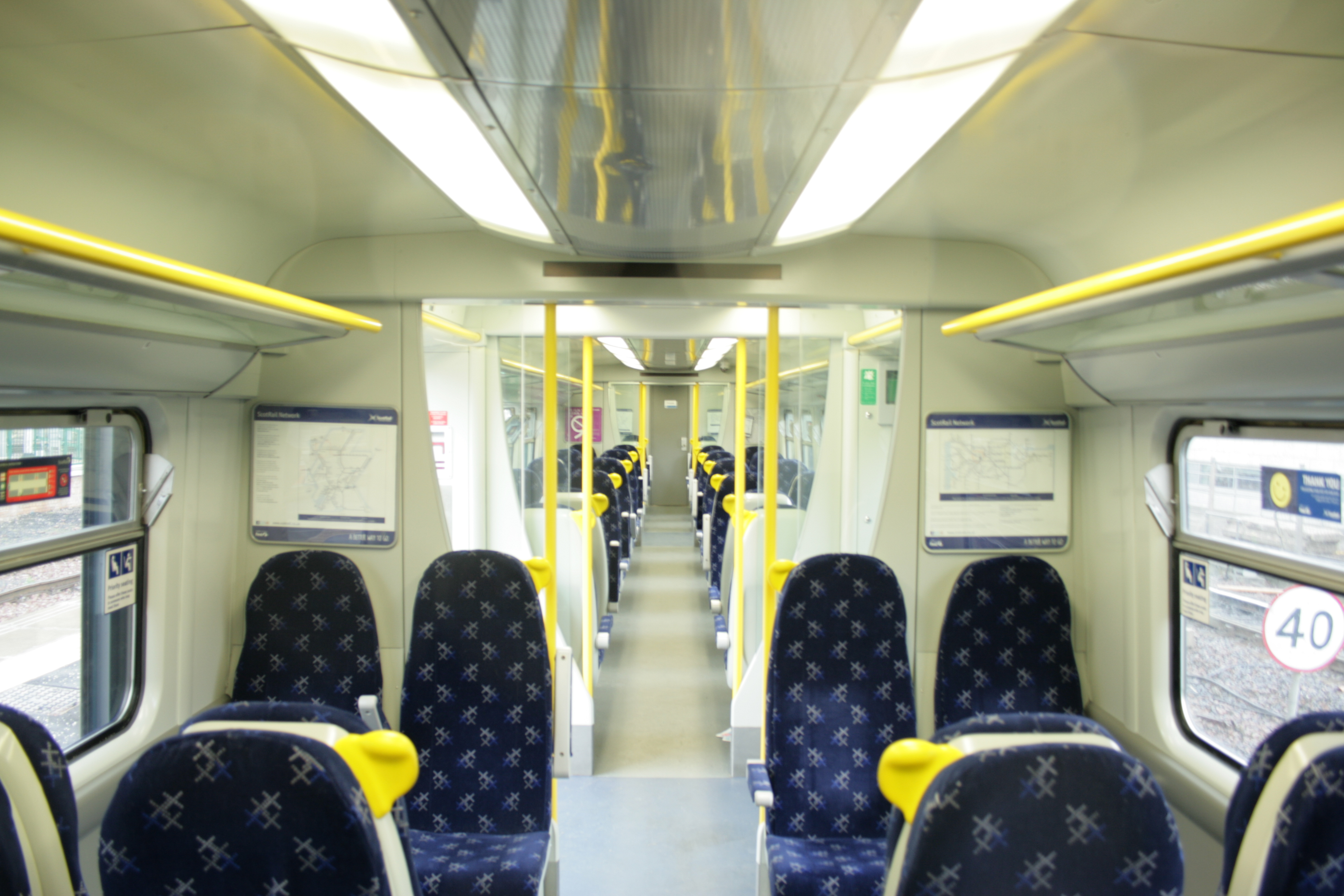
- Refurbished First ScotRail interior in 2013
- Stock type: Electric multiple unit
- In service: 3 April 2001 – present
- Manufacturer: Alstom
- Built at: Hungary (Note: bodyshells only); Washwood Heath, Birmingham (Note: Assembly)
- Family name: Coradia Juniper
- Replaced: Class 303
- Constructed: 1999–2002
- Refurbished: 2012–2014; 2015–2017
- Number built: 40
- Successor: Class 380
- Formation: 3 cars per unit: DMS-PTS-DMS
- Fleet numbers: 334001–334040
- Capacity: 183 seats
- Owner: Eversholt Rail Group
- Operator: ScotRail

Specifications
- Car body construction: Steel
- Train length: 61.96 m (203 ft 3 in)
- Car length: DMS vehs.: 21.01 m (68 ft 11 in); PTS vehs.: 19.94 m (65 ft 5 in)
- Width: 2.80 m (9 ft 2 in)
- Height: 3.77 m (12 ft 4 in)
- Doors: Double-leaf sliding plug (2 per side per car)
- Maximum speed: 90 mph (145 km/h)
- Traction system: Alstom ONIX 800 IGBT
- Traction motors: 4 × 270 kW (362 hp) (2 per DMS car)
- Power output: 1,080 kW (1,448 hp)
- Acceleration: 0.62 m/s^{2} (2.0 ft/s^{2}) max.
- Electric system: 25 kV 50 Hz AC overhead
- Current collection: Pantograph
- UIC classification: 2′Bo′+2′2′+Bo′2′
- Braking systems: Electro-pneumatic (disc), and regenerative
- Safety systems: AWS; TPWS
- Coupling system: As built: Tightlock; From 2015: Voith
- Multiple working: Within class
- Track gauge: 1,435 mm (4 ft 8 1/2 in) standard gauge

The British Rail Class 334 Coradia Juniper is a suburban electric multiple unit passenger train built by Alstom in Birmingham. They are part of Alstom's Coradia Juniper family of trains, along with Classes 458 and 460.

The trains are operated by ScotRail and mainly run on the North Clyde Line on Helensburgh Central - Edinburgh, Springburn - Milngavie and Airdrie - Balloch services. However, they can also sometimes be seen on the Argyle Line on Dalmuir/Milngavie to Whifflet/Motherwell/Larkhall/Cumbernauld services. They were ordered by SPT/ScotRail (when part of National Express) for outer-suburban services in Glasgow.

== History ==
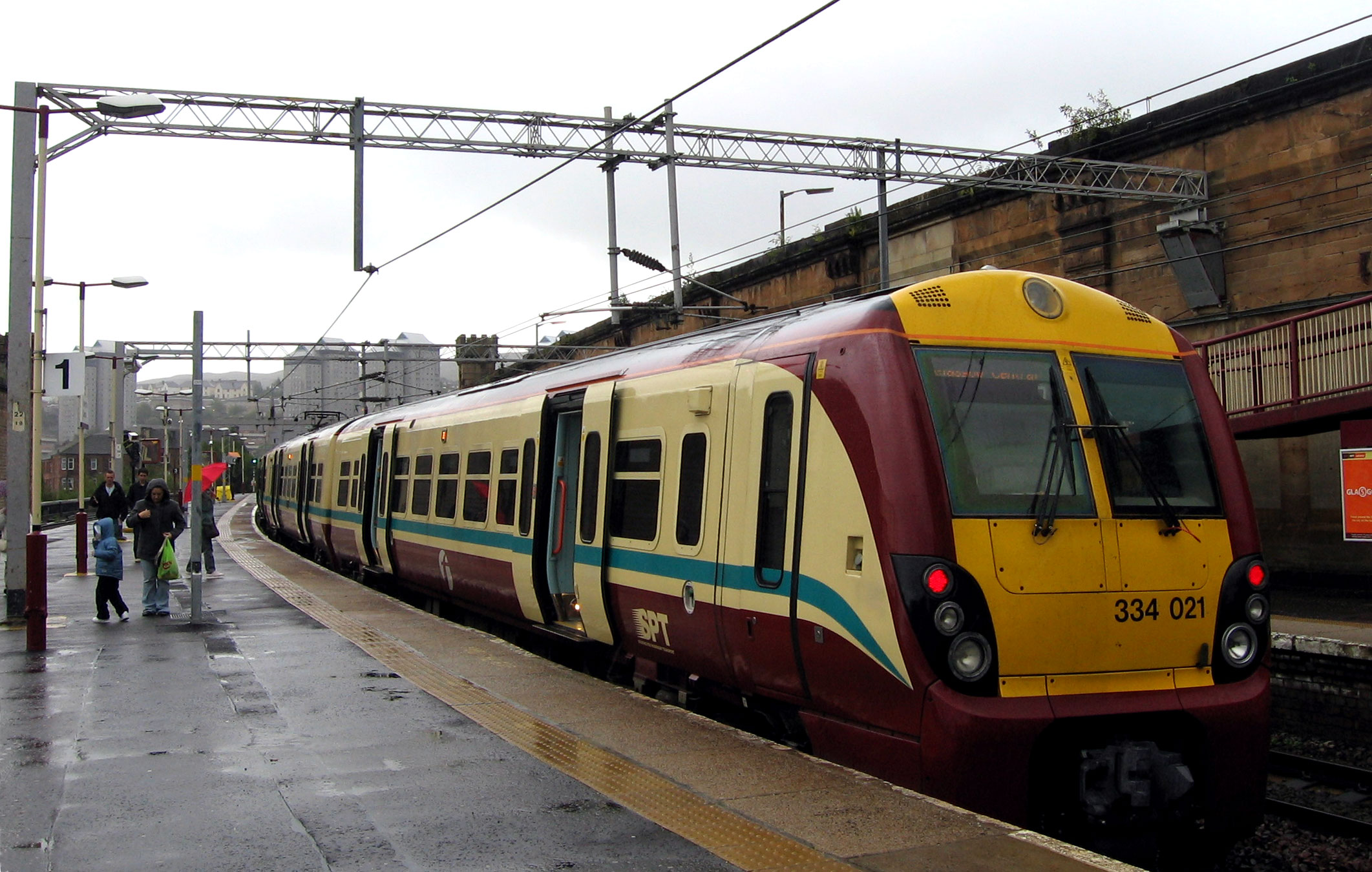
Class 334 in Strathclyde Partnership for Transport livery at Greenock Central

Their introduction saw the withdrawal of the last of Glasgow's venerable Class 303 "Blue Train" sets which had been in service since 1960. Although deliveries started to Strathclyde in 1999, the Class 334 did not enter passenger service until 2001 due to numerous teething problems (in common with other Coradia Juniper-based classes) and technical failures which plagued the new units upon their introduction.

All units are owned by Eversholt Rail Group. ScotRail leased a total of 40 units which can be seen in use daily across the SPT electric network. On the maiden run of the units, 334010 and 334020 ran to Gourock. The units initially ran on the Ayrshire and Inverclyde lines, but became a common sight on the Argyle and North Clyde lines.

From its introduction, the Class 334 operated on the Ayrshire Coast Line, Inverclyde Line, North Clyde Line and Argyle Line, but by June 2011 the class had been largely replaced on the Ayrshire and Inverclyde lines by the Class 380, with only occasional units seen on those routes.

== Relivery and refurbishment ==
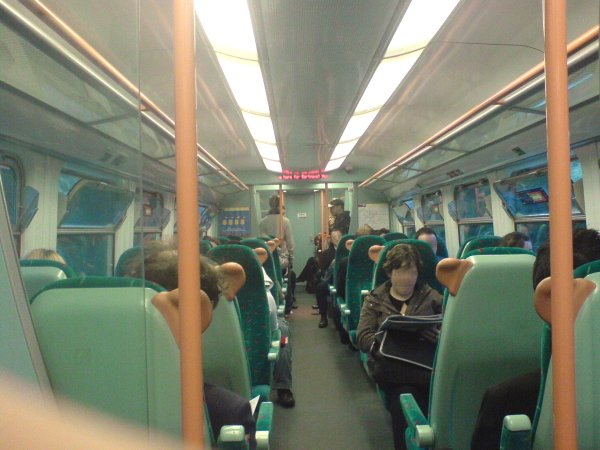
Interior before refurbishment

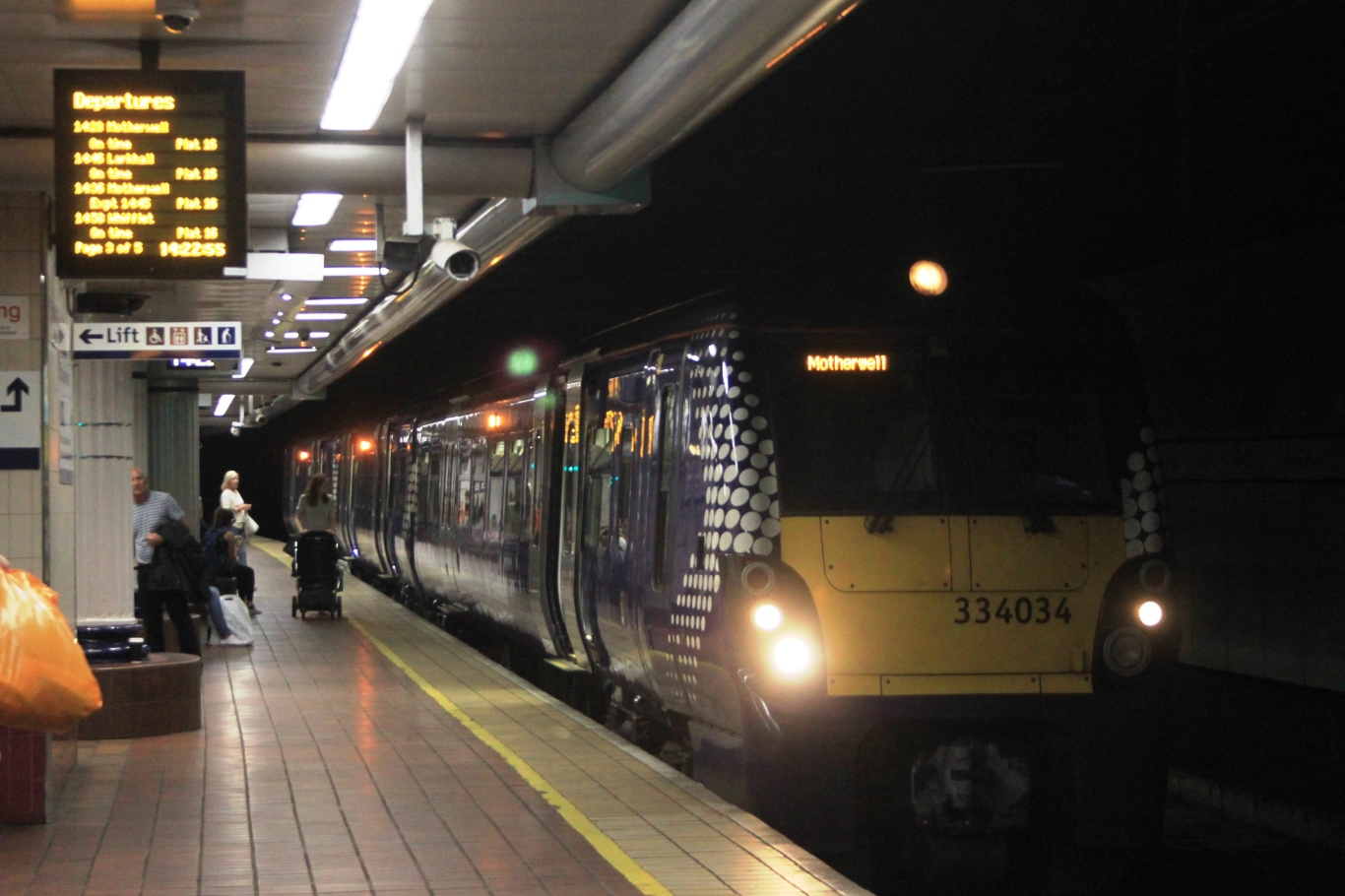
Class 334 at Glasgow Central Low Level

In September 2008, the Scottish Government's agency Transport Scotland announced that all ScotRail trains (including those from the Strathclyde Partnership for Transport) would be eventually repainted in a new, blue livery with white Saltire markings on the carriage ends. Class 334 re-livery began in November 2010 in preparation for the Airdrie to Bathgate reopening.

On 24 August 2011, ScotRail announced plans to refurbish all the fleet, with the project expected to start in November 2011 and take two years to complete. 334020 was the first unit to be refurbished at Kilmarnock's Brodie Rail Works from 3 February 2012 to 2 May 2012. The last unit to be refurbished was 334006, which left Brodie Works on 8 November 2014.

From early 2015, Eversholt commissioned Alstom to perform an extensive £36.1m overhaul of the entire fleet to improve passenger conditions, which included the retrofitting of full air conditioning, at-seat charging points, provision for wi-fi, passenger counting equipment, cycle spaces, LED lighting and CCTV in the saloons, and an upgraded CCTV system for driver-only operation. Improvements were also made to the reliability of the passenger doors, and the original Tightlock couplings were replaced with Scharfenberg-type automatic couplers manufactured by Voith, allowing Class 334 units to rescue and be rescued by Class 380 units. The overhaul process was completed in 2017.

On 22 June 2021 during Pride Month in the United Kingdom, a Class 334 was unveiled with progress flag colours. ScotRail stated that the livery would remain in place until 2029, after which the metalwork underneath would require repainting.

In 2023 Alstom was awarded a contract by Eversholt Rail to overhaul the Class 334 fleet. The work, with a contract value of £12 million, will be carried out at Polmadie Depot and is planned to start in January 2024.

== Accidents ==
- On 18 September 2000, An unreported pair of Class 334 units on test at Glasgow Central platform 11a, ran away from the platform due to the driver leaving the train in the 'Neutral' position, before closing the cab door to investigate a fault which allowed the train to gain Traction Interlock and allowed the brakes to release. As the platform was on an incline, the train began to move and had to be intentionally derailed on a set of Catch Points. Nobody was injured however testing of all Class 334's was suspended until the cause behind the incident was found. Testing eventually resumed around a month past the incident.
- On 16 January 2008, 334017 was involved in a minor collision whilst entering Glasgow Central station. The unit was working the 08:24 Gourock to Glasgow Central service when it collided with an empty, stationary Class 318. The train was travelling at less than 4 mph (6 km/h) when the collision occurred. Four passengers were slightly injured; however only one required hospital attention, and was transferred to Glasgow Southern General hospital in a taxi. The unit was undamaged.
- On 15 October 2015, 334016 was involved in a collision on the approach to Uphall railway station. The unit was working the 16:39 Edinburgh to Milngavie service when it collided with an empty Toyota Hilux pick-up truck which had been stolen and abandoned on the tracks. The train was travelling at approximately 75 mph (121 km/h) when the collision occurred. The unit did not derail, but one passenger suffered minor injuries to their hand from broken glass.
- On 19 October 2024, 334013 suffered a catastrophic TKF capacitor failure in Yoker C.S around 9am, resulting in an explosion heard throughout Western Glasgow. The unit has subsequently been out of service since then, with ScotRail confirming in a reply to a Freedom of Information request, that the unit required a replacement PMCF case and was expected to re-enter service in December 2026, though no official date has been given.

== Fleet details ==
Class	Operator	Qty.	Year built	Cars per unit	Unit nos.
334	ScotRail	40	1999–2002	3	334001–334040

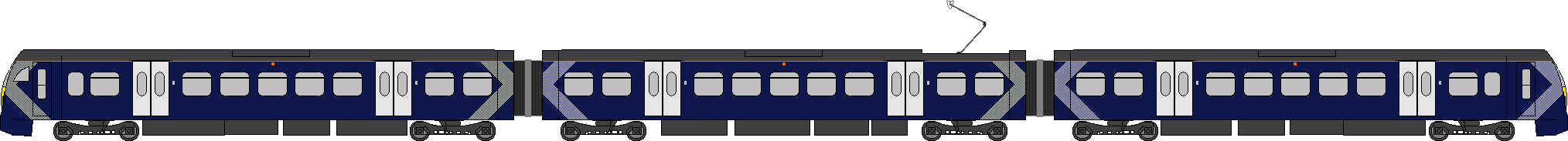
ScotRail Class 334
