= Hamilton Branch (railway) =

Railway in Lanarkshire, Scotland

The Hamilton Branch is a historic railway in Scotland, running from the Newton railway station to Ross Junction with the Caledonian Railway Coalburn Branch.

== History ==
- 17 September 1849 – Opened between Newton and Hamilton
- 29 May 1876 – Opened between Hamilton and Ross Junction

== Connections to other lines ==
- Coalburn Branch at Ross Junction
- Hamilton and Strathaven Railway (and onwards to the Busby Railway) at Hamilton West railway station
- Clydesdale Junction Railway, Glasgow Central Railway and Lanarkshire and Ayrshire Railway at Newton railway station

== Current operations ==
The line is open as part of the Argyle Line.
