= Hamilton bus station =

Bus station in Hamilton, South Lanarkshire, Scotland

Coordinates: 55°46′24.2″N 4°2′23.1″W

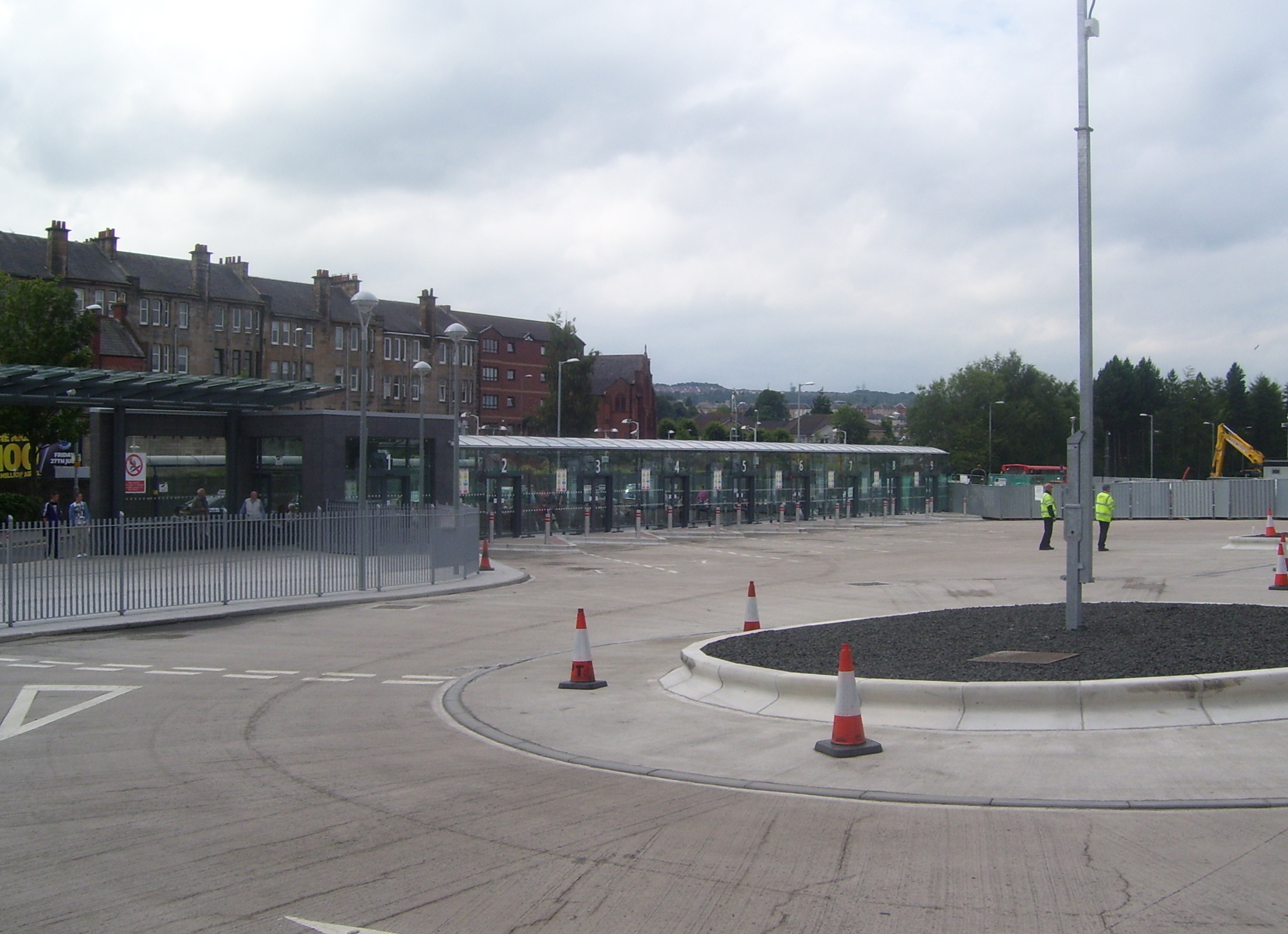

General information
- Location: Brandon Street, Hamilton; South Lanarkshire; Scotland
- Operator: Strathclyde Partnership for Transport
- Bus routes: U1 X1 5 13 41 41A X74 181 201 205 226 227 229 230 242 243 250 253 254 255 256 257 263 266 267 317 590
- Bus stands: 16
- Bus operators: First Glasgow; Stagecoach South Scotland; National Express Coaches; Park's Motor Group; ARG Travel; JMB Travel; Whitelaws Coaches; Stuarts Coaches
- Connections: Hamilton Central railway station

Construction
- Structure type: At-grade
- Parking: Pay and Display available nearby in Orchard Street Car Park
- Accessible: Step Free Access
Location

Hamilton Bus Station is a bus station that serves Hamilton, a large town in South Lanarkshire, Scotland.

== Overview ==
Managed by the Strathclyde Partnership for Transport, Hamilton Bus Station is ideally situated. It is next to the two Hamilton shopping malls, New Cross and Regent (both of which are located in the heart of Hamilton Town Centre), and is located within a densely populated area (around 350,000 live within 10 kilometres or 6 miles of the station). The travel centre is also located across from the entrance to the station. As well as this, the towns main railway station, Hamilton Central situated on the Argyle Line has frequent services to Motherwell, Cumbernauld and Larkhall on platform 2, with services to Dalmuir (via Glasgow Central) on platform 1.

Hamilton bus station is operational 24 hours a day. The station is also equipped with telephone boxes, toilets and a taxi rank, as well as 24-hour CCTV monitoring. There are also monitor displays inside the travel centre notifying arrivals/departures. The bus station is wheelchair accessible, and there is car-parking located to the west of the station.

There are a wide range of bus companies that stop at any of the 16 stands at the station, some of which travel nationwide. Some of them include First Glasgow, Stagecoach South Scotland and National Express.

== Renovations ==
On 18 March 2010, South Lanarkshire Council approved a major upgrade on Hamilton Bus station which would modernize the station and improve the links to the station with the nearby railway station and taxi rank. Also included were 14 bus stances, 3 coach stances, installation of electronic information screens, extra parking spaces and waiting areas. The upgrade got underway in late 2011, and work lasted for over a year.
