= Hamilton Central railway station =

Railway station in South Lanarkshire, Scotland

Hamilton Central Scottish Gaelic: Hamaltan Mheadhain
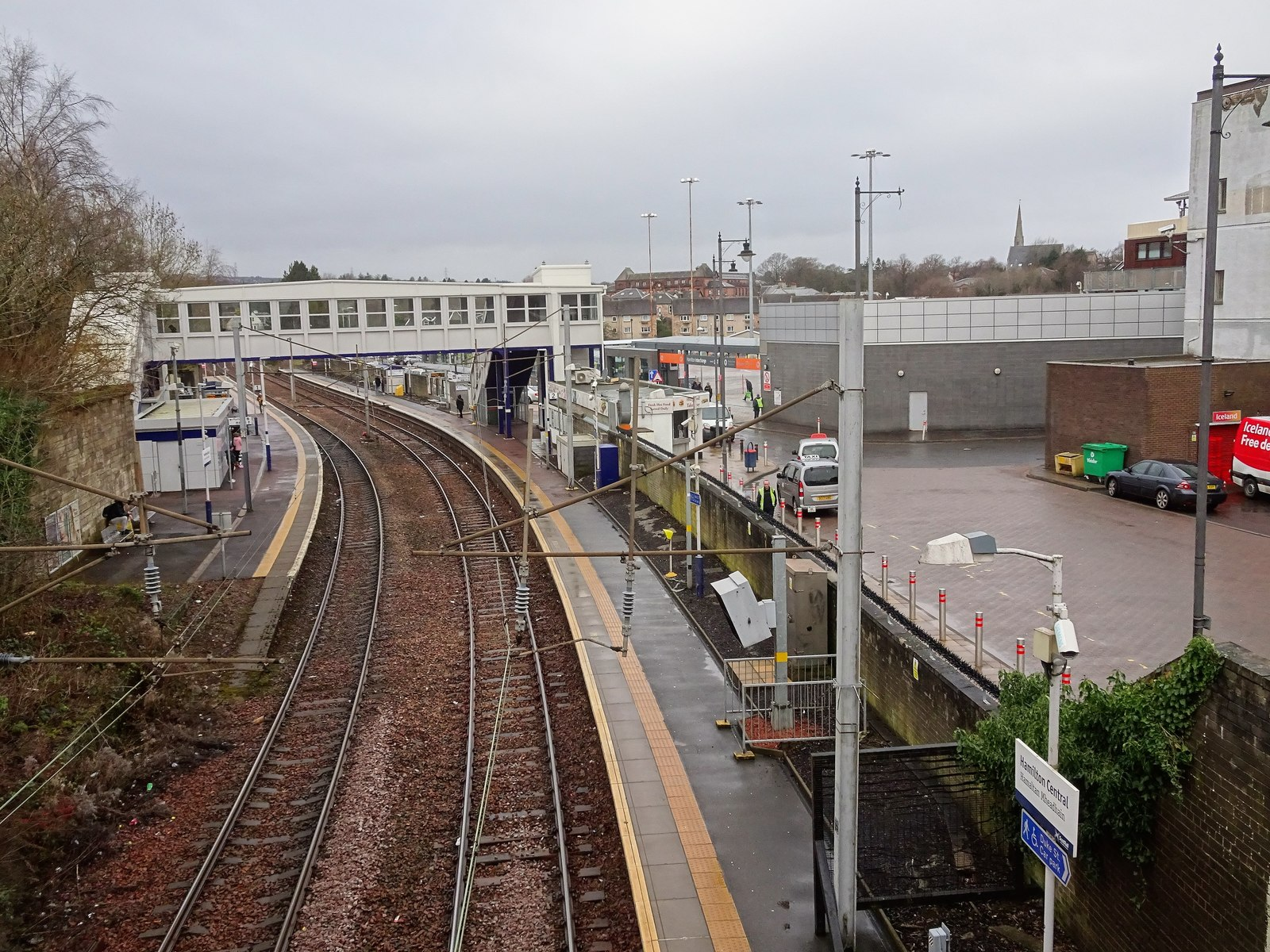

General information
- Location: Hamilton, South Lanarkshire; Scotland
- Coordinates: 55.7732°N 4.0388°W
- Grid reference: NS722552
- Manager: ScotRail
- Transit authority: SPT
- Platforms: 2

Other information
- Station code: HNC

Key dates
- 1876: Opened

Passengers
- 2021/22: ▲0.379 million
- Interchange: ▲2,603
- 2022/23: ▲0.527 million
- Interchange: ▼2,333
- 2023/24: ▲0.649 million
- Interchange: ▲5,076
- 2024/25: ▲0.687 million
- Interchange: ▲6,116
- 2025/26: ▼0.677 million
- Interchange: ▲7,668
Location
Notes
- Passenger statistics from the Office of Rail and Road

Hamilton Central railway station serves Hamilton, South Lanarkshire in Scotland, lying on the Argyle Line. It is situated in the town centre, adjacent to the Hamilton bus station, as well as the Regent Shopping Centre, Hamilton's main shopping location. In March 2007, SPT announced a redevelopment of the bus and railway stations into a combined interchange, which was completed in winter 2012.

== History ==
The station (which opened in 1876) used to have four lines running through between two platforms. The western platform (Glasgow bound) is the original one. The other platform with ticket office is a replacement. It was built approximately where the southbound through line ran and then replaced the original. There was a turntable just to the south of the station on the east (Motherwell bound track). The semi-circular retaining wall can still be seen. There was a signal box opposite at John Street level accessed from John Street. The goods yard was to the north of the station, encompassing the whole of the current bus station and car park. The goods yard entrance and main Station entrance was from adjacent to the top cross. There was a large retaining wall that ran from the cross up Quarry Street to about where the Quarry street steps now sit. The entry road ran adjacent to the wall and curved away from the wall as it approached the station and yard entrances. The Quarry street steps replaced an office, at street level, and set of steps leading down to the main Station platform. There is also an entrance to the other platform on the south side of the bridge. It has a grand arched stone portico but is sealed now with an ornate design facing the pavement. The steps are still existing but the archway to the platform is walled up. In addition there was a line that went from the position of the disused pedestrian bridge opposite South Park Road (site of another signal box. The line then went across Kemp Street and along the line of car parking in Graham Street then crossed Quarry Street to enter the gas works. This line terminated just before Selkirk Street. The line went through still extant gates beside the main line at Kemp Street. The entry gates to the gas works are also still existing. The line terminated just to the south of the larger gas tank that now only exists as a circular concrete pad. The working part of the gasworks with a vertical bucket line emerging above its roof was more or less where the print works is on Portland Place

The platforms were connected by a covered overbridge. There were stairs on the north and ramps to the south. The "shadow" of the ramps can be seen on the Glasgow bound platform wall.

There was an overall roof. Wooden cladding extended from the supporting walls to the edge of the platforms with only the girders passing across. There was a pair of lifts adjacent to the metal overbridge at the south end of the platforms. The overbridge still matches the original four lines. In July 2021 the old Grey parapets/bridge edges, werereplaced with new taller steel parapets. Although these are taller they are the same length as before and attached to a strengthened edge of the underlying bridge (as per conversation with one of the engineers on the site) The line through the station was electrified in 1974, as part of the wider project to wire the northern end of the West Coast Main Line.

In 2016, construction began on a new, covered, passenger footbridge between the platforms. The new bridge will be compliant with disability regulations and feature lifts from the platforms to the bridge itself. In order to accommodate this the booking office on platform 2 and the waiting shelter on platform 1 have both been demolished, with tickets currently being sold from a temporary cabin next to the platform 2 entrance. Once the new bridge is completed in 2017, the existing footbridge will be removed and new passenger facilities constructed.

== Services ==
=== 2006/07 ===
Since the re-opening of the Larkhall branch in December 2005, Hamilton Central has been served by four trains per hour towards Glasgow Central (north west). Two of these services run from Larkhall to Dalmuir with a limited stopping pattern until Glasgow, with the other two from the Motherwell direction. In the south east (other) direction, there are two trains per hour to Motherwell/Lanark and two trains per hour to Larkhall.

=== 2016 ===
Following a major recast of the Argyle Line timetable in the wake of the electrification of the Whifflet Line, the service pattern from this station has altered significantly. There are still two trains per hour each to Motherwell and Larkhall, but one of the former now runs to Cumbernauld via Whifflet rather than Lanark. Glasgow-bound services meanwhile now call at all stations to Central Low Level and then proceed to Dalmuir via Clydebank or to Milngavie. On Sundays, there is a train every half-hour each way to Motherwell and Milngavie and an hourly service each way on the Larkhall to Balloch route.

Preceding station	National Rail	Following station
Airbles	ScotRail; Argyle Line; Hamilton Circle	Hamilton West
Chatelherault	ScotRail; Argyle Line; Larkhall Branch	Hamilton West
