= Lanark railway station =

Railway station in South Lanarkshire, Scotland

Lanark Scottish Gaelic: Lannraig
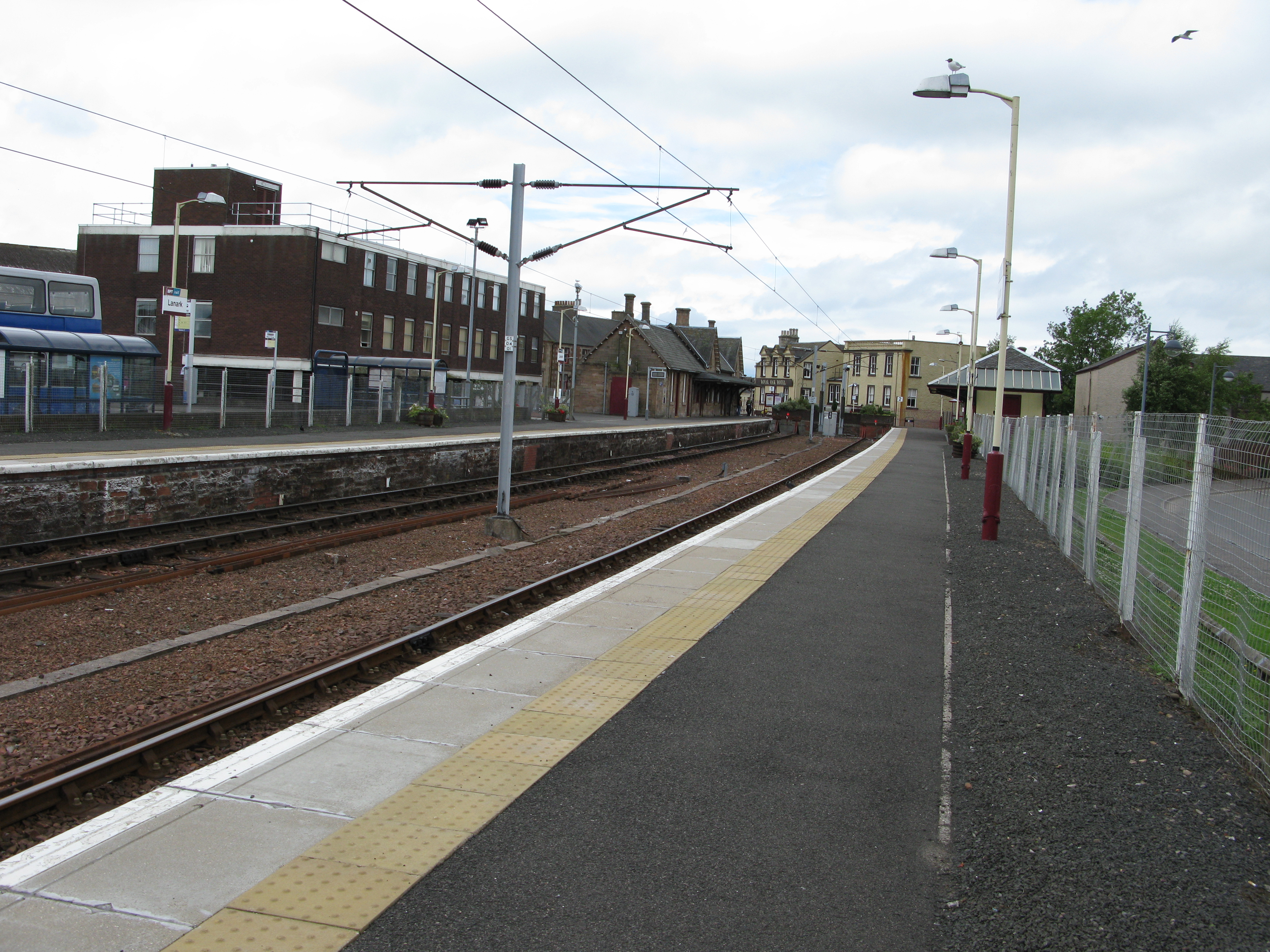
- Platform 2 at Lanark railway station, looking towards the ticket office

General information
- Location: Lanark, South Lanarkshire; Scotland
- Coordinates: 55.6735°N 3.7723°W
- Grid reference: NS886436
- Manager: ScotRail
- Transit authority: Strathclyde Partnership for Transport
- Platforms: 2

Other information
- Station code: LNK
- Fare zone: L3

History
- Opened: 5 June 1855; 171 years ago
- Original company: Lanark Railway
- Pre-grouping: Caledonian Railway
- Post-grouping: London, Midland and Scottish Railway

Passengers
- 2021/22: ▲0.144 million
- 2022/23: ▲0.203 million
- 2023/24: ▲0.247 million
- 2024/25: ▲0.264 million
- 2025/26: ▲0.271 million
Location
Notes
- Passenger statistics from the Office of Rail and Road

Lanark railway station, managed by ScotRail, is the southern terminus of the Argyle Line on Bannatyne Street, Lanark, South Lanarkshire, Scotland. The station is staffed part-time.

== History ==
Lanark station opened in 1855, as the terminus of a short branch line off the Caledonian Railway's West Coast Main Line. The branch had a triangular junction with the main line to allow trains from Lanark to head west towards Carluke or east to Carstairs. The eastern curve closed in the 1960s.

There was another triangular junction closer to Lanark station itself, and this is just north of the golf course and the embankments are still clearly visible. (summer 2017)

These were the two curves leading from the Lanark branch towards Muirkirk and Ayrshire and Lanark racecourse halt of course.

In 1864, a line south from Lanark to Douglas was opened, and in 1874 it was extended to Muirkirk in Ayrshire, where it formed an end-on junction with the Glasgow and South Western Railway, though that line closed in 1964.

In 1974, the Lanark branch was included in the West Coast Main Line "Electric Scots" electrification project by British Rail.

== Services ==
There is a peak approximately half-hourly, and an off-peak hourly, ScotRail to Glasgow Central High Level via Shieldmuir, Motherwell and Bellshill, taking a little less than an hour.

Services on this route formerly ran via Holytown, and all trains continued via the Argyle Line to the north west suburbs of the city, but since the electrification of the Whifflet Line these now run to and from High Level instead, and run fast beyond Cambuslang.

There are no southbound or eastbound services, as the branch only has a northbound chord connecting it to the West Coast Main Line (WCML) at Lanark Junction.

There have been calls for the southbound chord to be reconnected to allow direct services from Lanark to Edinburgh, but the route was subsequently re-used for housing.

Preceding station	National Rail	Following station
Terminus	ScotRail; Argyle Line	Carluke
	Historical railways	
Carstairs	Caledonian Railway; Main Line	Cleghorn
Terminus	Caledonian Railway; Branch to Douglas & G&SWR	Sandilands
