= Argyle Line =

Suburban railway line running east–west through Glasgow

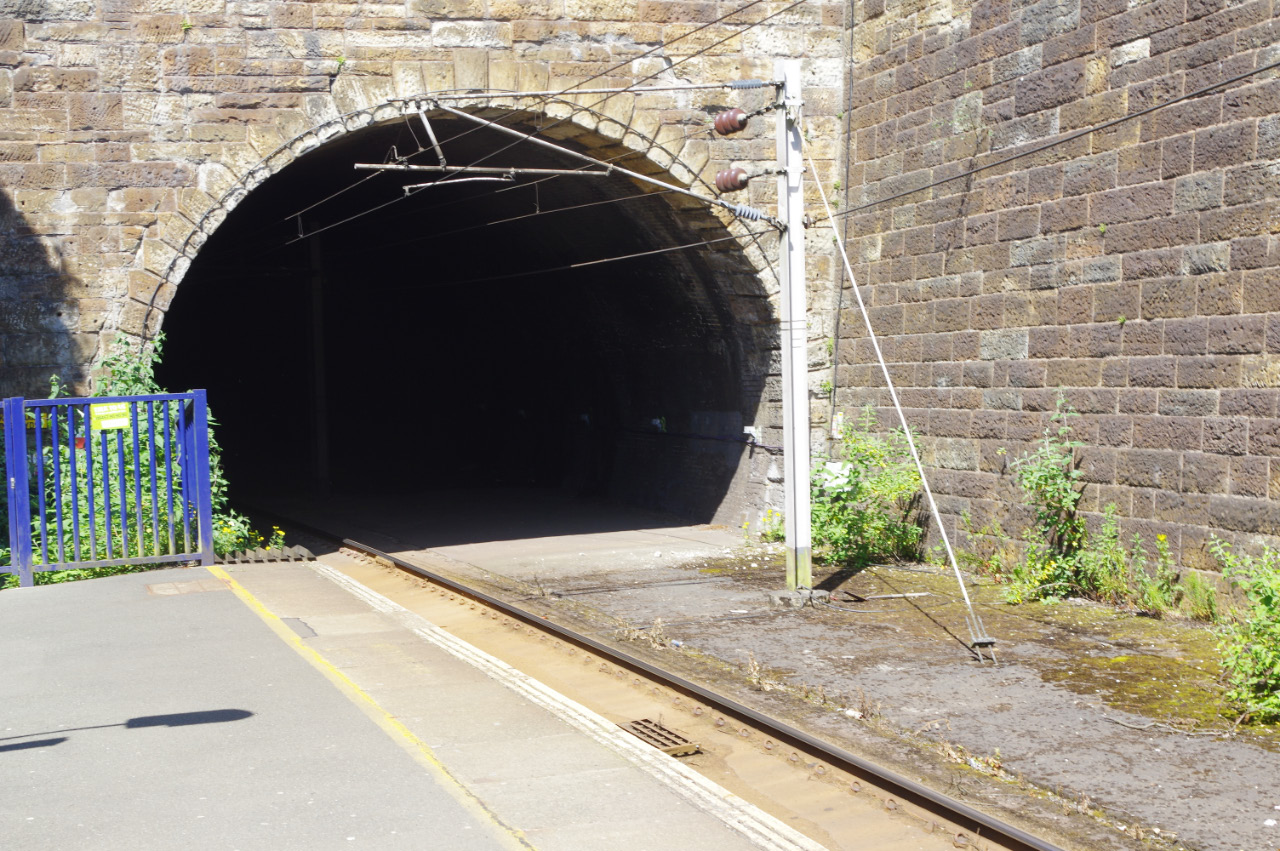
- Eastern portal of the Kelvinhaugh Tunnel at Exhibition Centre, 2019.

Overview
- Status: Operational
- Owner: Network Rail
- Locale: Glasgow; North Lanarkshire; South Lanarkshire; East Dunbartonshire; West Dunbartonshire
- Stations: 48

Service
- Type: Heavy rail
- System: National Rail
- Rolling stock: Class 318; Class 320; Class 334; Class 385

History
- Opened: 1979

Technical
- Track gauge: 4 ft 8 1/2 in (1,435 mm) standard gauge
- Electrification: 25 kV 50 Hz AC
Route map
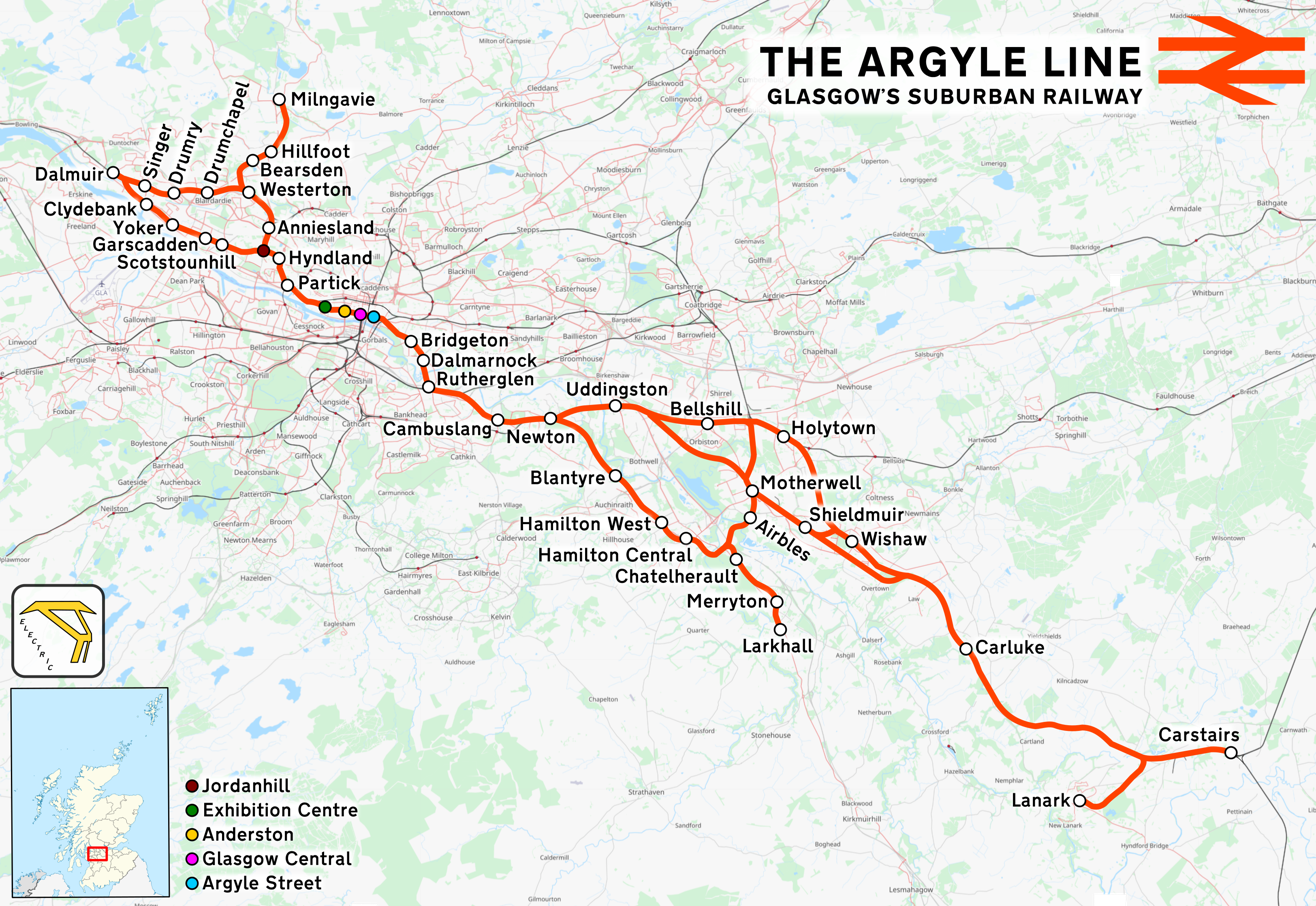

The Argyle Line is a suburban railway located in West Central Scotland. The line serves the commercial and shopping districts of Glasgow's central area, and connects towns from West Dunbartonshire to South Lanarkshire. Named for Glasgow's Argyle Street, the line uses the earlier cut-and-cover tunnel running beneath that thoroughfare.

The term "Argyle Line" is commonly used to describe:

- the extensive urban passenger train service that connects the towns and suburbs of North Clyde with Motherwell, Larkhall, and Lanark, to the southeast. Of the 48 stations, 4 are in West Dunbartonshire, 4 in East Dunbartonshire, 17 in Glasgow City, 10 in North Lanarkshire, and 13 in South Lanarkshire.
- the central portion of railway infrastructure encompassing less than 5 miles (8 km).

== History ==
=== Prior to 1964 ===
The Glasgow Central Railway (GCR) under central Glasgow opened in 1886, connecting the Lanarkshire and Dunbartonshire Railway at Maryhill Central and Stobcross Railway at Stobcross to the Lanarkshire and Ayrshire Railway near Kirkhill, Rutherglen and Coatbridge Railway at Carmyle, Clydesdale Junction Railway and Polloc and Govan Railway at Rutherglen, and Clydesdale Junction Railway at Newton. The line closed in 1964 as a result of the Beeching Axe.

=== 1979 ===
The line between Rutherglen and Finnieston was electrified by 4 June 1979, although the line was not in regular use at the time.

On 1 November 1979, Elizabeth II officially opened the Argyle Line (in conjunction with the inauguration of the modernised Glasgow Subway), with services commencing four days later. This joint venture between British Rail and the Strathclyde Passenger Transport Executive (SPTE) comprised a tunnel diversion and reopening the 4.5-mile (7.2 km) Stobcross–Rutherglen low-level line. However, the Argyle name later applied to the combined Dalmuir–Lanark routes.

=== Infrastructure ===
The former Caledonian Railway (CR) line via Whiteinch, Partick West, and Partick Central (Kelvin Hall) remained abandoned. The new connection with the original North British Railway route via Hyndland and a rebuilt Partick also incorporated a grade-separated junction with the Queen Street Low Level route. The already electrified North Clyde Line northwest of Partick and West Coast Main Line (WCML) southeast of Rutherglen were linked by laying double tracks and installing overhead electrical wiring along the disused section that had separated these networks. At Rutherglen, a new platform was built and the main line ones abandoned.

Finnieston West Junction–Dalmarnock is sub-surface:

- Brickwork was power washed and repaired.
- Concrete slabs superseded ballast.
- Former GCR stations at Glasgow Green and Glasgow Cross remained disused. The frontage of Glasgow Green station was demolished in March 2012, and the entrance to Glasgow Cross station (adjacent to the Tollbooth) has been turned into ventilation ducts, visible from the traffic island between Trongate and London Road.
- Argyle Street became a new station 0.2 miles (320 m) west of the former Glasgow Cross.
- Exhibition Centre (called Finnieston until 1986) was rebuilt. Slightly to the west of the original GCR Stobcross station, the only commonality between the two is the location of much of the eastbound platform (which was originally the westbound one). A new siding enabled westbound trains to stable and turn back.
- Tunnel lengths are Kelvinhaugh (Finnieston West Junction–Exhibition Centre) 968 yards (885 m), Stobcross (Exhibition Centre–Anderston) 500 or 640 yards (460 or 590 m), Anderston (Anderston–Glasgow Green) 2,800 yards (2,600 m), Canning St (Glasgow Green–Bridgeton) 460 or 510 yards (420 or 470 m), and Dalmarnock Rd (Bridgeton–Dalmarnock) 766 yards (700 m).

=== Flooding ===
In December 1994, the River Kelvin breached its banks releasing a deluge into the Exhibition Centre–Argyle Street section to a depth of more than 3 metres (10 ft), trapping two trains, and resulting in a nine-month closure. Dalmuir-Lanark services were diverted over the North Clyde Line, running as far as Blairhill, and using the Gartsherrie connecting line to rejoin the Argyle Line further south of Coatbridge Central. Dalmarnock has been flooded several times.

=== Extensions ===
The Larkhall Line was opened as an extension to Argyle Line services in December 2005 by First Minister Jack McConnell. Formerly the CR Coalburn Branch, the rebuilt/new stations are Chatelherault, Merryton, and the Larkhall terminus. The branch is single line throughout, with a crossing loop at Allanton. Milngavie, formerly a North Clyde service, became a destination.

The Whifflet Line service that reopened in October 1993 received electrification of the Rutherglen–Whifflet section in December 2014. This enabled a rerouting through Glasgow Central Low Level to the western suburbs, increased frequency on the route, reduced WCML usage conflict, and created a diversionary path for long distance WCML services. At the same time, Lanark services switched to Glasgow Central High Level.

=== Service patterns ===
Prior versions

Passenger trains per hour (Nov 1979 opening)
| Terminus | Via | Terminus | Mon–Sat | Sun |
|---|---|---|---|---|
| Motherwell | Bellshill | Dumbarton Central | 1 | |
| Motherwell | Blantyre | Dumbarton Central | 1 | |
| Motherwell | Bellshill | Partick | 2 | |
| Motherwell | Blantyre | Partick | 2 | |
| Milngavie | limited stops | Lanark | 1 | |

Passenger trains per hour (1982–83)
| Terminus | Via | Terminus | Mon–Sat | Sun |
|---|---|---|---|---|
| Motherwell | Bellshill | Dumbarton Central | 1 | |
| Motherwell | Blantyre | Dumbarton Central | 1 | |
| Motherwell | Hamilton Central | Dalmuir | 2 | |
| Motherwell | Bellshill | Dalmuir | 2 | |
| Lanark | limited stops | Anderston | 1 | |

Passenger trains per hour (2002–03)
| Terminus | Via | Terminus | Mon–Sat | Sun |
|---|---|---|---|---|
| Motherwell | | Dalmuir | 3 | |
| Lanark | | Dalmuir | 1 | |

Passenger trains per hour (2003–04)
| Terminus | Via | Terminus | Mon–Sat (off peak) | Sun |
|---|---|---|---|---|
| Lanark | Holytown, Hamilton Central, Singer | Dalmuir | 1 | |
| Motherwell | Hamilton Central, Singer | Dalmuir | 1 | |
| Motherwell | Bellshill, Yoker | Dalmuir | 1 | |
| Lanark | Shieldmuir, Bellshill, Yoker | Dalmuir | 1 | |
| Motherwell | Hamilton Central, Yoker | Balloch | | 2 |
| Lanark | Shieldmuir, Bellshill | Milngavie | | 1 |
| Motherwell | Bellshill | Milngavie | | 1 |

Passenger trains per hour (2006–07)
| Terminus | Via | Terminus | Mon–Sat | Sun |
|---|---|---|---|---|
| Lanark | Holytown, Blantyre | Milngavie | 1 | |
| Lanark | Shieldmuir, Bellshill | Milngavie | | 1 |
| Lanark | Shieldmuir, Bellshill, Yoker | Dalmuir | 1 | |
| Larkhall | Singer (limited stops) | Dalmuir | 2 | |
| Motherwell | Blantyre | Milngavie | 1 | |
| Motherwell | Bellshill | Milngavie | | 1 |
| Motherwell | Bellshill, Yoker | Dalmuir | 1 | |
| Motherwell | Blantyre, Yoker | Balloch | | 2 |

Passenger trains per hour (2007–08)
| Terminus | Via | Terminus | Mon–Sat | Sun |
|---|---|---|---|---|
| Lanark | Holytown, Blantyre | Milngavie | 1 | |
| Lanark | Shieldmuir, Bellshill | Milngavie | | 1 |
| Lanark | Shieldmuir, Bellshill, Yoker | Dalmuir | 1 | |
| Larkhall | Singer (limited stops) | Dalmuir | 2 | |
| Larkhall | (limited stops) | Partick | | 1 |
| Motherwell | Blantyre | Milngavie | 1 | |
| Motherwell | Bellshill | Milngavie | | 1 |
| Motherwell | Bellshill, Yoker | Dalmuir | 1 | |
| Motherwell | Blantyre, Yoker | Balloch | | 2 |

| Passenger trains (2014–15) | | | Direction/Frequency per hour | |
| Terminus | Via | Terminus | Mon–Sat (off peak) | Sun (from 8:20am) |
|---|---|---|---|---|
| Cumbernauld | Motherwell, Hamilton Central, Yoker | Dalmuir | NW/1 | |
| Dalmuir | Singer, Whifflet | Motherwell | SE/1 | |
| Dalmuir | Singer | Whifflet | SE/1 | |
| Dalmuir | Yoker | Larkhall | SE/2 | |
| Milngavie | Hamilton Central | Motherwell | SE/1 | both/2 |
| Milngavie | Hamilton Central, Motherwell | Cumbernauld | SE/1 | |
| Glasgow Central | Bellshill, Shieldmuir | Lanark | both/2 | both/1 |
| Larkhall | Singer | Dalmuir | NW/2 | |
| Larkhall | Yoker | Balloch | | both/1 |
| Motherwell | Hamilton Central, Yoker | Dalmuir | NW/1 | |
| Motherwell | Whifflet | Milngavie | NW/1 | |
| Motherwell | Whifflet | Balloch | | both/1 |
| Motherwell | Bellshill | Glasgow Central | | both/1 |
| Whifflet | | Milngavie | NW/1 | |

Passenger trains per hour (2016–17)
| Terminus | Via | Terminus | Mon–Sat (off peak) | Sun |
|---|---|---|---|---|
| Cumbernauld | Blantyre, Yoker | Dalmuir | 1 | |
| Lanark | Bellshill | Glasgow Central | 2 | 1 |
| Larkhall | | Milngavie | 2 | |
| Motherwell | Blantyre, Yoker | Dalmuir | 1 | |
| Motherwell | Whifflet, Singer | Dalmuir | 1 | |
| Motherwell | Whifflet, Yoker | Balloch | | 1 |
| Motherwell | Blantyre | Milngavie | | 2 |
| Motherwell | Bellshill | Glasgow Central | | 1 |
| Milngavie | Blantyre | Cumbernauld | 1 | |
| Whifflet | Singer | Dalmuir | 1 | |

== Services ==
=== Routes ===
At Dalmuir Park Junction, southeastwards enters the Yoker line, before rejoining at Hyndland East Junction, and eastwards remains on the North Clyde (officially North Electric Main Line) via Singer and Westerton Junction, where the 3.2-mile (5.1 km) Milngavie Branch joins. This route continues via Knightswood North and South junctions, and Hyndland.

Eastbound trains enter the Kelvinhaugh Tunnel immediately to the west of Sandyford Street. This tunnel joins the original section on the Lanarkshire and Dunbartonshire Railway from Partick Central, just south of Kelvinhaugh Street; finally meeting the disused GCR Stobcross Depot Tunnel, just inside the common southeast portal of these two tunnels. The mouth of the Stobcross Depot Tunnel can be seen from the eastbound platform of Exhibition Centre.

Westbound trains ascend to join the North Clyde line from Queen Street station. This steep incline originally gave access to the sidings at Queen's Dock from the Stobcross Railway.

The WCML is accessed after Rutherglen. At Rutherglen East Junction, the Whifflet line emerges eastwards, and the route later passes east of Bellshill. At Newton Junction, eastwards follows the WCML via Uddingston, and southeastwards is the Hamilton Circle. At Haughhead Junction, 1.2 miles (1.9 km) east of Hamilton Central, a 3-mile (4.8 km) branch leads to Larkhall. The Hamilton Circle terminates at Motherwell.

Bellshill is 2.3 miles (3.7 km) after leaving the WCML at Uddingston Junction. Beyond the station, the route joins the line south from Whifflet, returning to the WCML at Motherwell. Southeast 13.3 miles (21.4 km) at Lanark Junction, the 2.5-mile (4 km) single-track branch serves Lanark, the southeastern extremity.

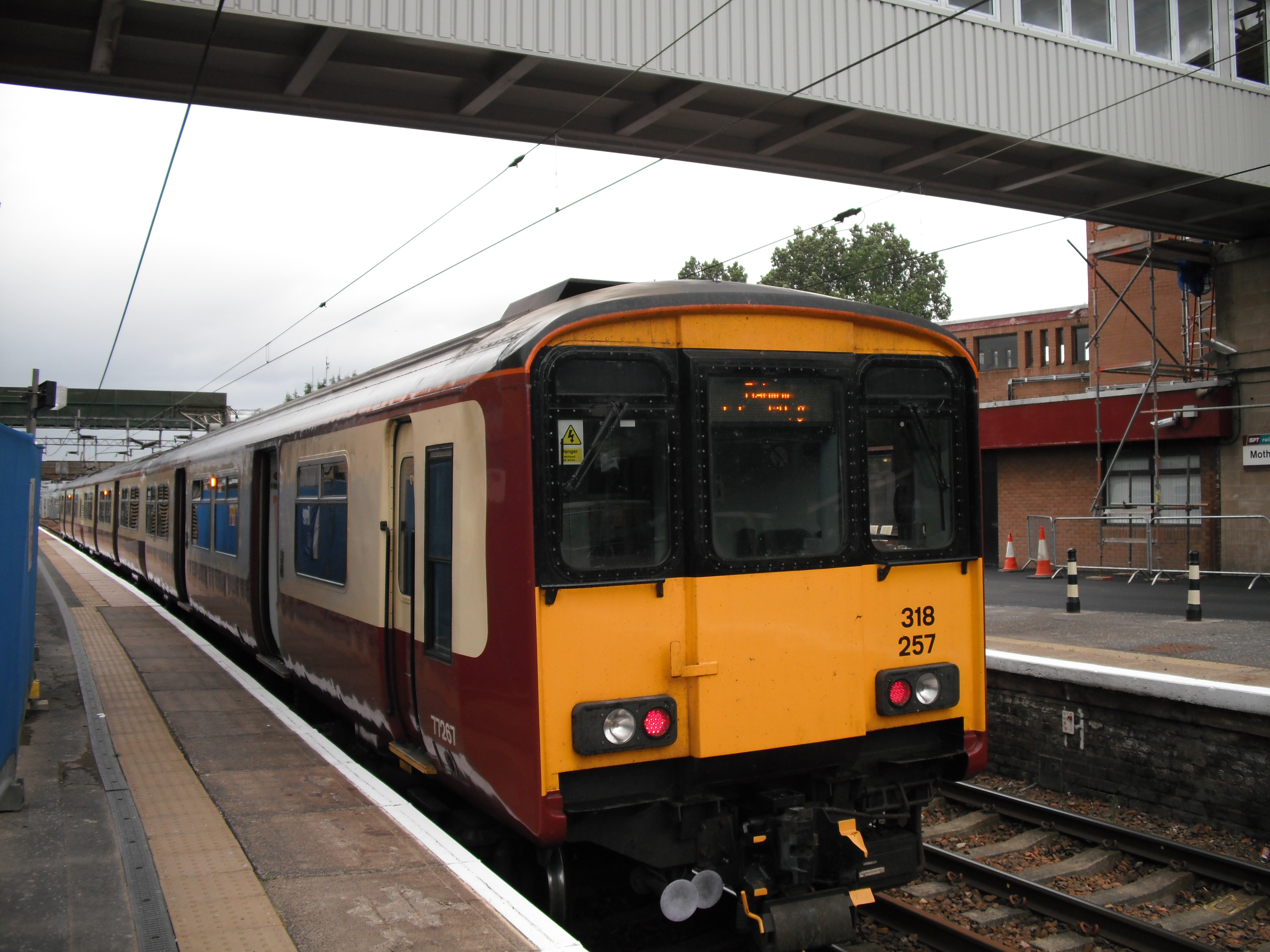
Class 318s are a common sight on the Argyle Line. 318257 is pictured at Motherwell.

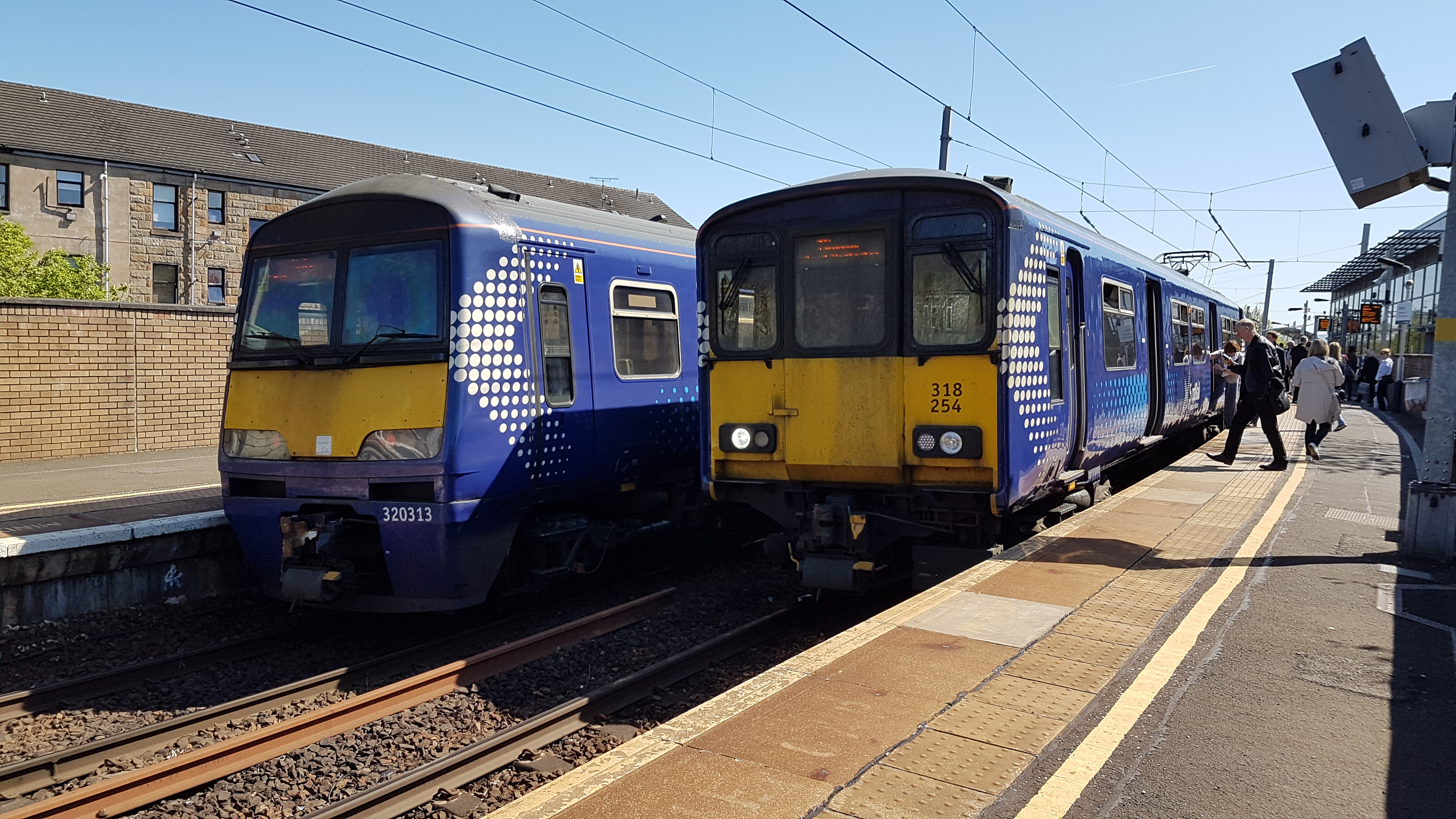
Class 318s and Class 320s work the bulk of Argyle Line services. 318254 and 320313 stand side by side at Partick.

=== Frequency ===
Passenger trains per hour (2020/21)
| Terminus | Via | West of | Mon–Sat (off peak) | Sun (from 8:10am) |
|---|---|---|---|---|
| Dalmuir | Yoker | Glasgow Central Low Level | 4 | |
| Dalmuir | Singer | Glasgow Central Low Level | 2 | |
| Milngavie | | Glasgow Central Low Level | | 2 |
| Balloch | | Glasgow Central Low Level | | 2 |

Passenger trains per hour (2020/21)
| Terminus | Via | East of | Mon–Sat (off peak) | Sun (from 8:20am) |
|---|---|---|---|---|
| Larkhall | Hamilton Central | Glasgow Central Low Level | 2 | 1 |
| Motherwell | Whifflet | Glasgow Central Low Level | 1 | 1 |
| Motherwell | Hamilton Central | Glasgow Central Low Level | 1 | 2 |
| Cumbernauld | Motherwell, Hamilton Central | Glasgow Central Low Level | 1 | |
| Whifflet | | Glasgow Central Low Level | 1 | |

== Rolling stock ==
At its opening, the rolling stock on the Argyle Line was Class 314 electric multiple units, which were then new. These were accompanied by a number of the older Class 303 "Blue Train" sets from the North Clyde route. In the late 1980s and early 1990s, Class 311 trains also operated on this route. After the 303s were retired in 2002, the route was operated by a mixture of new Class 334 Alstom "Juniper" units, alongside a small number of 1980s vintage Class 318 trains cascaded from the Ayrshire routes, with the original Class 314 sets transferred to the Cathcart Circle. Following the opening of the Airdrie-Bathgate rail link, most Class 334 units were transferred to services on this route. The Class 320s were subsequently fitted with yaw dampers, allowing for 90 mph (145 km/h) running up from their previous 75 mph (120 km/h) limit, which enabled them to replace the Class 334s on Argyle Line services.

The Argyle Line is operated by Class 320s and Class 318s with the occasional Class 334 appearing and Class 385s covering Lanark services that now run into Glasgow Central. Class 380s used to operate the line from 2014 to 2019 covering Lanark services when they first ran into Central High Level.
