= Dalmuir railway station =

Railway station in West Dunbartonshire, Scotland

Dalmuir Scottish Gaelic: An Dail Mhòr
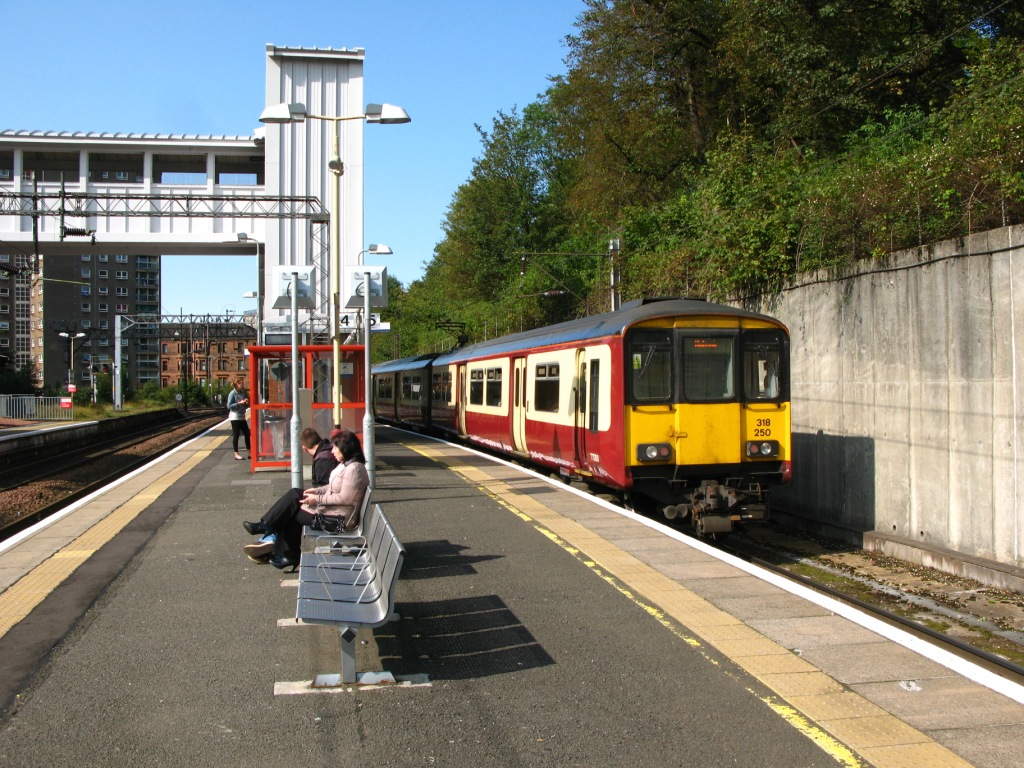
- The Yoker route platforms

General information
- Location: Dalmuir, West Dunbartonshire; Scotland
- Coordinates: 55.9120°N 4.4270°W
- Grid reference: NS484714
- Manager: ScotRail
- Transit authority: SPT
- Platforms: 5

Other information
- Station code: DMR

History
- Original company: Glasgow, Dumbarton and Helensburgh Railway & Glasgow, Yoker and Clydebank Railway
- Pre-grouping: North British Railway
- Post-grouping: LNER

Key dates
- 31 May 1858: Original station opened
- May 1897: Station resited
- May 1952: Renamed Dalmuir Park
- August 1973: Reverted to Dalmuir

Passengers
- 2021/22: ▲0.441 million
- Interchange: ▲20,369
- 2022/23: ▲0.562 million
- Interchange: ▼16,150
- 2023/24: ▲0.731 million
- Interchange: ▲18,431
- 2024/25: ▲0.768 million
- Interchange: ▼4,218
- 2025/26: ▲0.772 million
- Interchange: ▲21,402
Location
Notes
- Passenger statistics from the Office of Rail and Road

Dalmuir railway station is a railway station serving the Dalmuir area of Clydebank, West Dunbartonshire, Scotland. It is a large, five-platform interchange between the Argyle Line, North Clyde Line and West Highland Line, between Singer and Clydebank (both to the south-east) and Kilpatrick (to the north-west). It is situated 9 miles 71 chains (15.9 km) from Glasgow Queen Street, measured via Westerton and Maryhill.

== History ==
The original two-platform station opened on 31 May 1858. The station was relocated to its current location in May 1897 by the North British Railway and enlarged to four platforms to accommodate the extension of the Glasgow, Yoker and Clydebank Railway from Clydebank. The station was known as Dalmuir Park between 1952 and 1973. A fifth platform was added as part of the Argyle Line expansion in 1979.

== Station layout ==
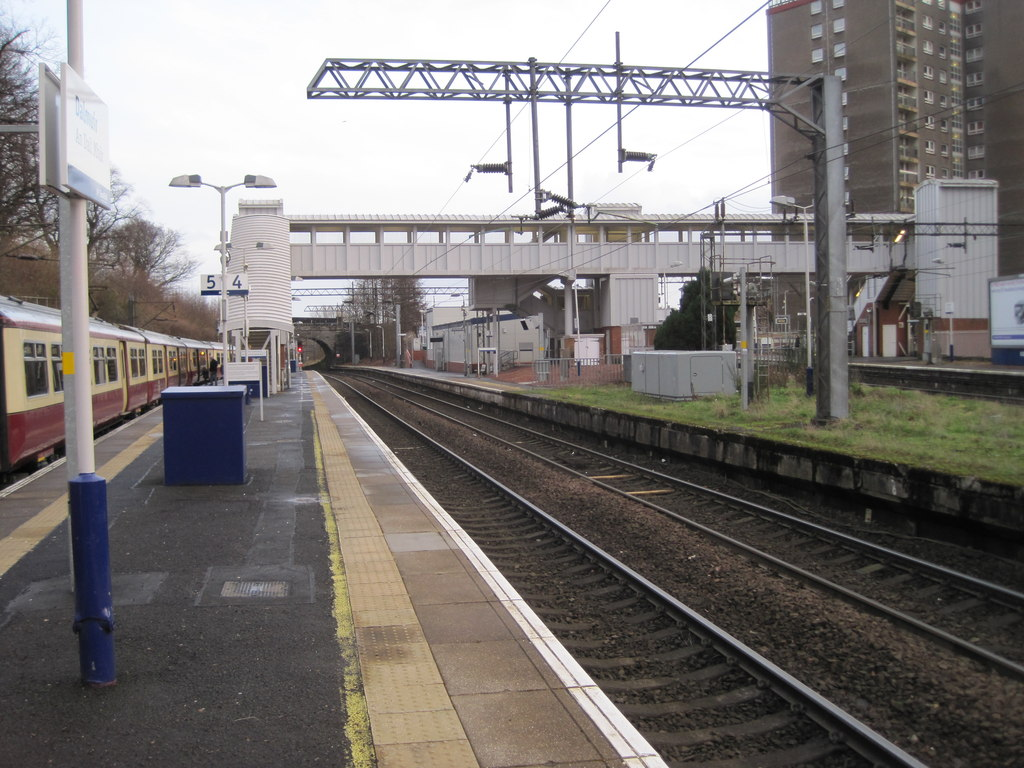
A photo showing the 5 platforms at the station. The three diverging to the left continue to Yoker, whilst the two on the right form the line via Singer

There are four through platforms, two on the Yoker branch and two on the Singer branch along with a terminal bay platform from the Yoker branch. The two inner platforms link up at the north end of the station, where there were formerly two footbridges - one spanning each pair of lines; however these were dismantled after being replaced by a new, fully disability-accessible bridge fitted with three lifts that links all five platforms in 2009.

== Passenger volume ==
Passenger volume at Dalmuir
	2002–03	2004–05	2005–06	2006–07	2007–08	2008–09	2009–10	2010–11	2011–12	2012–13	2013–14	2014–15	2015–16	2016–17	2017–18	2018–19	2019–20	2020–21	2021–22	2022–23
Entries and exits	458,679	536,035	620,781	623,286	618,003	736,614	715,916	744,184	801,950	805,254	845,818	899,962	907,038	961,242	921,420	922,534	915,936	128,016	440,666	561,532
Interchanges	– (Note: No data available.)	6,957	33,575	28,625	17,415	31,546	59,050	55,526	69,026	114,081	112,419	61,456	65,859	119,809	42,309	40,724	37,573	10,199	20,369	16,150

The statistics cover twelve-month periods that start in April.

== Services ==
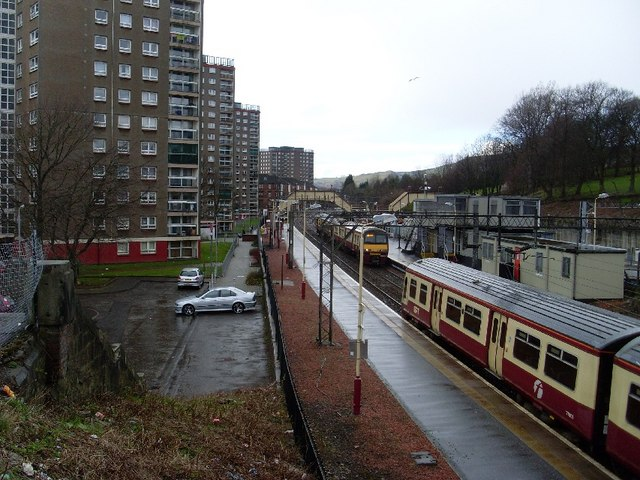
View from Duntocher Road

Dalmuir is a junction station between the North Clyde line to Glasgow Queen Street, and the Argyle line to Glasgow Central, with trains from both stations continuing to serve various destinations further east and south. Both of these lines have access to two separate routes to the city; via Singer or via Yoker, which subsequently rejoin at Hyndland, before splitting again at Partick. Trains originating from Glasgow Central typically terminate here, with those originating from Glasgow Queen Street serving destinations further west. The station is also served by trains to/from the West Highland line, which travel non-stop to Glasgow Queen Street. The station is also served by Caledonian sleeper trains, providing night services to London Euston, and additional trains to the West Highland line.

=== ScotRail ===
As of March 2025, the typical off-peak service in trains per hour (tph) and trains per day (tpd) is:

- 2 tph to Edinburgh Waverley via Glasgow Queen Street (semi-fast)
- 2 tph to Airdrie via Singer and Glasgow Queen Street
- 2 tph to Larkhall via Singer, Glasgow Central and Hamilton Central
- 1 tph to Cumbernauld via Yoker, Glasgow Central and Hamilton Central and Motherwell
- 1 tph to Motherwell via Yoker, Glasgow Central and Hamilton Central
- 2 tph to Whifflet via Yoker and Glasgow Central, of which 1 continues to Motherwell
- 2 tph to Balloch
- 2 tph to Helensburgh Central
- 6 tpd to Glasgow Queen Street (non-stop)
- 6 tpd to Oban, of which 3 have a portion which divides at Crianlarich and runs to Mallaig via Fort William

The typical service on Sundays is:

- 2 tph to Edinburgh Waverley via Singer and Glasgow Queen Street
- 1 tph to Motherwell via Yoker, Glasgow Central and Whifflet
- 1 tph to Larkhall via Yoker, Glasgow Central and Hamilton Central
- 2 tph to Balloch
- 2 tph to Helensburgh Central
- 3 tpd to Glasgow Queen Street (non-stop)
- 3 tpd to Oban, of which 2 have a portion which divides at Crianlarich and runs to Mallaig via Fort William

=== Caledonian Sleeper ===
The typical service is:

- 1 tpd to London Euston via Glasgow Queen Street, Edinburgh Waverley and Crewe, except Saturday evenings
- 1 tpd to Fort William, except Sunday Mornings

Preceding station	National Rail	Following station
Singer	ScotRail; Argyle Line	Terminus
Clydebank	ScotRail; Argyle Line	Terminus
Singer	ScotRail; North Clyde Line	Kilpatrick
Clydebank	ScotRail; North Clyde Line	Kilpatrick
Glasgow Queen Street (High Level)	ScotRail; West Highland Line	Dumbarton Central
Glasgow Queen Street (Low Level)	Caledonian Sleeper (Highland Caledonian Sleeper)	Dumbarton Central
	Historical railways	
Singer; Line and station open	North British Railway; Glasgow, Dumbarton and Helensburgh Railway	Kilpatrick; Line and station open
Singer Works; Line partially open; station closed	North British Railway; Glasgow, Dumbarton and Helensburgh Railway	Kilpatrick; Line and station open
Clydebank; Line and station open	North British Railway; Glasgow, Yoker and Clydebank Railway	Terminus

== Bibliography ==
- Awdry, Christopher (1990). Encyclopaedia of British Railway Companies. Sparkford: Patrick Stephens Ltd. ISBN 1-8526-0049-7. OCLC 19514063. CN 8983.
- Butt, R. V. J. (October 1995). The Directory of Railway Stations: details every public and private passenger station, halt, platform and stopping place, past and present (1st ed.). Sparkford: Patrick Stephens Ltd. ISBN 978-1-85260-508-7. OCLC 60251199. OL 11956311M.
- Jowett, Alan (March 1989). Jowett's Railway Atlas of Great Britain and Ireland: From Pre-Grouping to the Present Day (1st ed.). Sparkford: Patrick Stephens Ltd. ISBN 978-1-85260-086-0. OCLC 22311137.
- Quick, Michael (2022). Railway Passenger Stations in Great Britain: A Chronology (PDF) (5th ed.). London: Railway and Canal Historical Society.
- Stansfield, Gordon (2003). Glasgow and Dunbartonshire's Lost Railways. Catrine: Stenlake Publishing Limited. ISBN 978-184-033-235-3.
