= Larkhall railway station =

Railway station in South Lanarkshire, Scotland

Larkhall Scottish Gaelic: Taigh na h-Uiseig
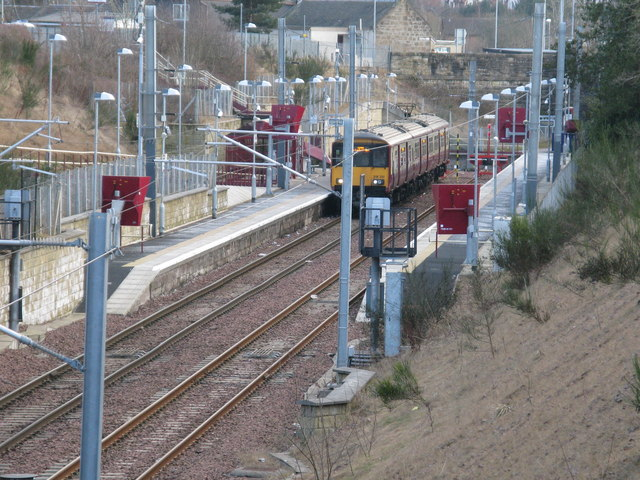

General information
- Location: Larkhall, South Lanarkshire; Scotland
- Coordinates: 55.7390°N 3.9753°W
- Grid reference: NS760513
- Manager: ScotRail
- Transit authority: SPT
- Platforms: 2

Other information
- Station code: LRH

Key dates
- 1 July 1905: Opened as Larkhall Central
- 4 October 1965: Closed to passengers
- 4 November 1968: Line Closed
- 12 December 2005: Re-opened

Passengers
- 2021/22: ▲0.152 million
- 2022/23: ▲0.205 million
- 2023/24: ▲0.244 million
- 2024/25: ▲0.255 million
- 2025/26: ▼0.244 million
Location
Notes
- Passenger statistics from the Office of Rail and Road

Larkhall railway station serves the town of Larkhall, South Lanarkshire, Scotland. The station is the south-eastern terminus of the Argyle Line, 16 1/4 miles (26.2 km) south east of Glasgow Central railway station.

== History ==
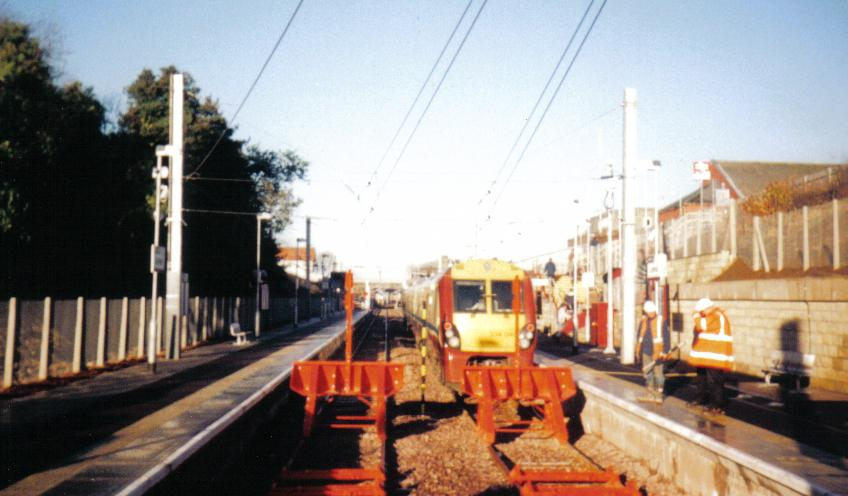
Larkhall station on the first day of opening to the general public

The station was originally opened as Larkhall Central on 1 July 1905 by the Caledonian Railway as part of their Mid Lanark Lines which filled in various gaps around Larkhall, Stonehouse, Strathaven and Blackwood. It closed to passengers on 4 October 1965.

== Re-opening ==
Forty years after closure, the station was officially reopened on 9 December 2005 by Jack McConnell MSP, the then First Minister for Scotland. Passenger services started on 12 December 2005, with trains serving the Argyle Line.

== Services ==
From opening in December 2005, trains run every 30 minutes to Glasgow Central and beyond to Dalmuir. As of May 2016, they run to Milngavie instead, but southbound arrivals still originate from Dalmuir.

An hourly Sunday service started from December 2007 on a one-year trial basis. This trial has been successful, and the hourly Sunday service is now a permanent feature. It runs to Balloch via Clydebank.

| Preceding station | National Rail | Following station |
|---|---|---|
| Terminus | ScotRail; Argyle Line - Larkhall Branch | Merryton |
| | Historical railways | |
| Stonehouse; Line and station closed | Mid Lanark Lines; Caledonian Railway | Ferniegair; Line and station open |

Argyle Line services are currently operated by Class 318s and Class 320s.
