= Balloch railway station =

Railway station in West Dunbartonshire, Scotland

Balloch Scottish Gaelic: Am Bealach
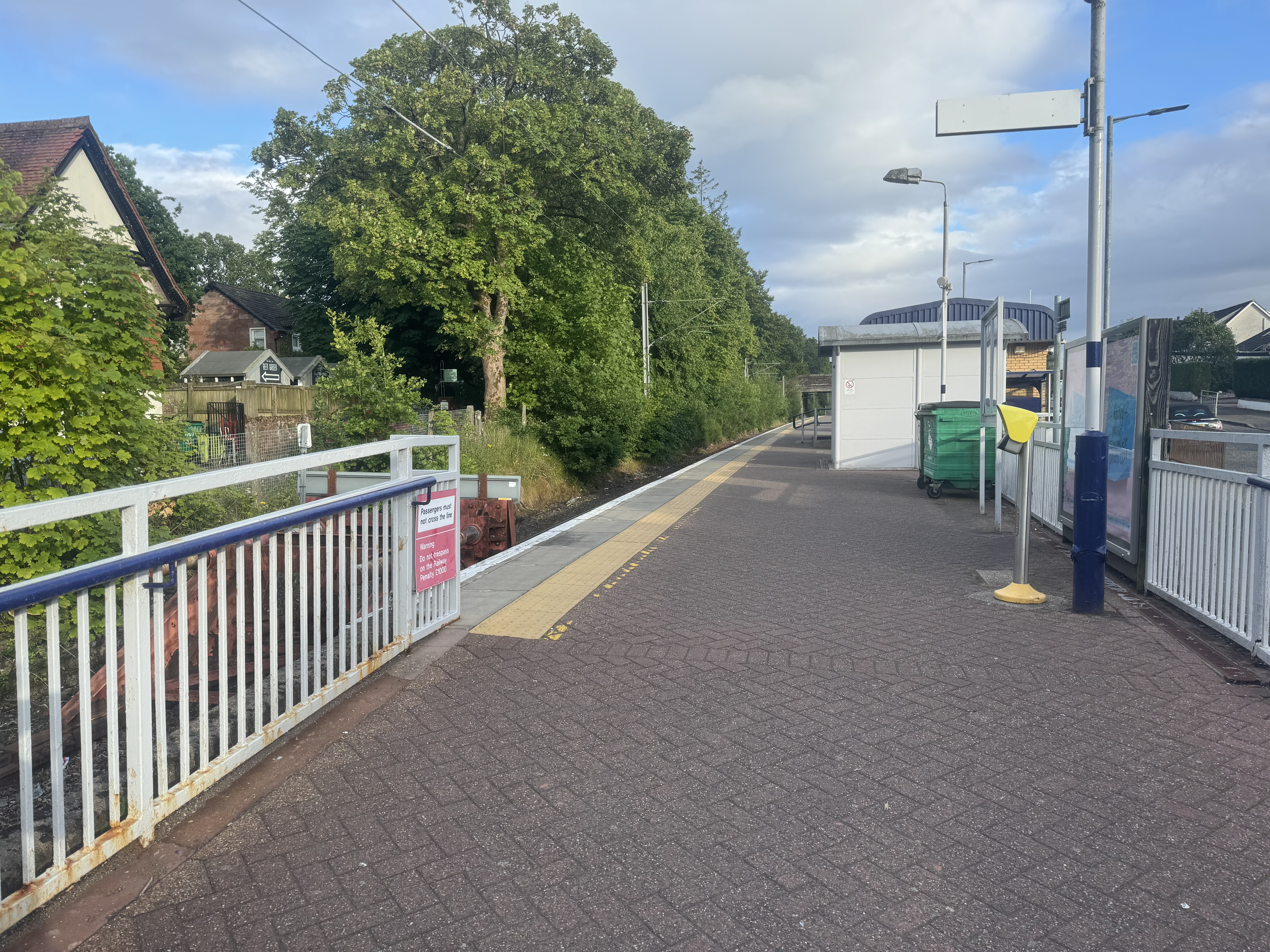
- Southbound view of the station platform, June 2024

General information
- Location: Balloch, West Dunbartonshire; Scotland
- Coordinates: 56.0021°N 4.5831°W
- Grid reference: NS389818
- Manager: ScotRail
- Transit authority: SPT
- Platforms: 1

Other information
- Station code: BHC

Key dates
- 24 April 1988: Opened by British Rail

Passengers
- 2021/22: ▲0.279 million
- 2022/23: ▲0.351 million
- 2023/24: ▲0.431 million
- 2024/25: ▲0.444 million
- 2025/26: ▲0.464 million
Location
Notes
- Passenger statistics from the Office of Rail & Road

Balloch railway station is a railway station serving the town of Balloch in Scotland. The station is a western terminus of the North Clyde Line, sited 20 miles 38 chains (33.0 km) northwest of Glasgow Queen Street, measured via Singer and Maryhill.

== History ==
Although the line through the station was opened in July 1850, the current Balloch station was opened by British Rail and SPTE on 24 April 1988, replacing the former Balloch Central station which was situated immediately north of a level crossing on Balloch Road. Closure of this level crossing was made possible by the closure of the previous terminus station, Balloch Pier, in 1986. The station is located 1/2 mile (800 m) south of where Balloch Pier station stood. This relocation allowed the level crossing to be removed.

In 2023, it was announced that Balloch would receive a brand new park & ride facility, at a cost of £50,000.

== Location ==
It lies within the boundary, by just over 150 metres (160 yd), of the Loch Lomond & Trossachs National Park and provides one of few examples of an overhead electrified railway operating within a UK national park.

== Facilities ==
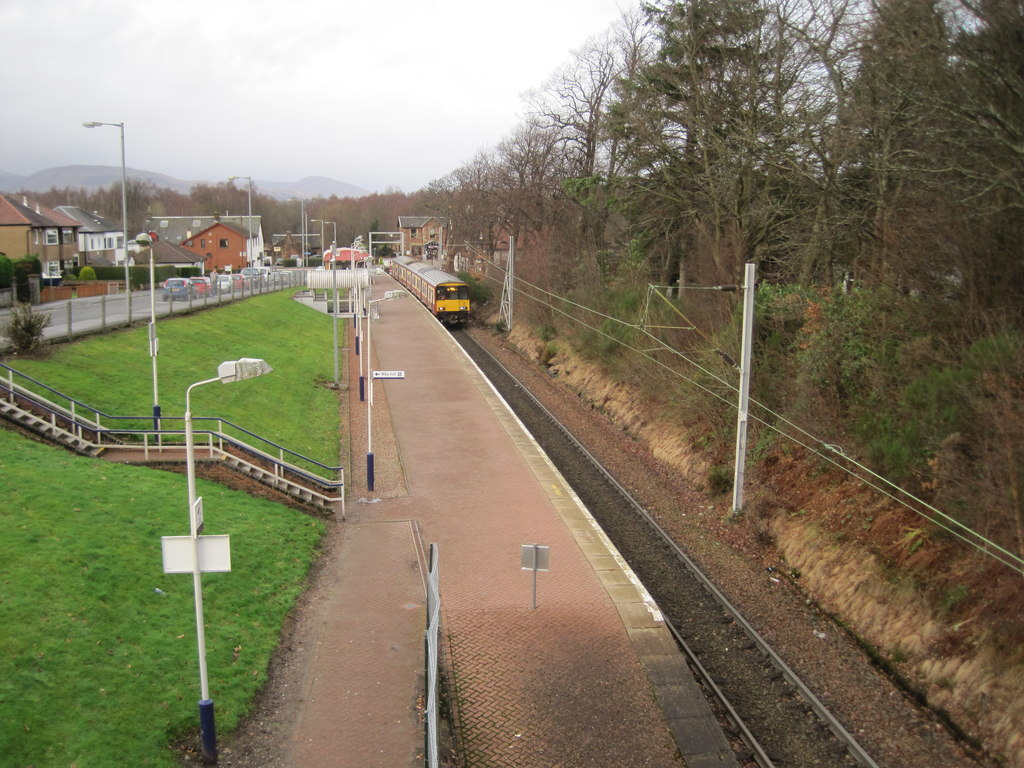
The station seen in 2012

The station has a ticket office, an accessible toilet, a shelter, seats, a help point and bike racks. The station has a stepped entrance from Tullichewan Road, and three step-free entrances from Balloch Road, Lomond Road and Balloch Road. All of the station is step-free.

== Passenger volume ==
Passenger Volume at Balloch
	2002–03	2004–05	2005–06	2006–07	2007–08	2008–09	2009–10	2010–11	2011–12	2012–13	2013–14	2014–15	2015–16	2016–17	2017–18	2018–19	2019–20	2020–21	2021–22	2022–23	2023–24
Entries and exits	463,350	486,973	552,343	554,798	571,658	600,764	539,450	546,924	552,912	559,570	516,450	553,606	546,584	543,006	529,196	554,282	487,734	67,320	278,900	351,268	430,574

The statistics cover twelve month periods that start in April.

== Services ==
The typical off-peak service in trains per hour Mondays to Saturdays is:

- 2 tph to Airdrie via Singer and Glasgow Queen Street

The typical service on Sundays is:

- 1 tph to Motherwell via Yoker, Glasgow Central and Whifflet
- 1 tph to Larkhall via Yoker, Glasgow Central and Hamilton Central

Preceding station	National Rail	Following station
Alexandria	ScotRail; North Clyde Line	Terminus

== Bibliography ==
- Brailsford, Martyn, ed. (December 2017) [1987]. Railway Track Diagrams 1: Scotland & Isle of Man (6th ed.). Frome: Trackmaps. ISBN 978-0-9549866-9-8.
- Butt, R. V. J. (October 1995). The Directory of Railway Stations: details every public and private passenger station, halt, platform and stopping place, past and present (1st ed.). Sparkford: Patrick Stephens Ltd. ISBN 978-1-85260-508-7. OCLC 60251199. OL 11956311M.
- Quick, Michael (2022). Railway Passenger Stations in Great Britain: A Chronology (PDF) (5th ed.). London: Railway and Canal Historical Society. Archived from the original (PDF) on 15 March 2023.
- "Balloch opens for business". RAIL. No. 82. EMAP National Publications. July 1988. p. 15. ISSN 0953-4563. OCLC 49953699.
