= Milngavie railway station =

Railway station in East Dunbartonshire, Scotland

Milngavie Scottish Gaelic: Muileann-Gaidh
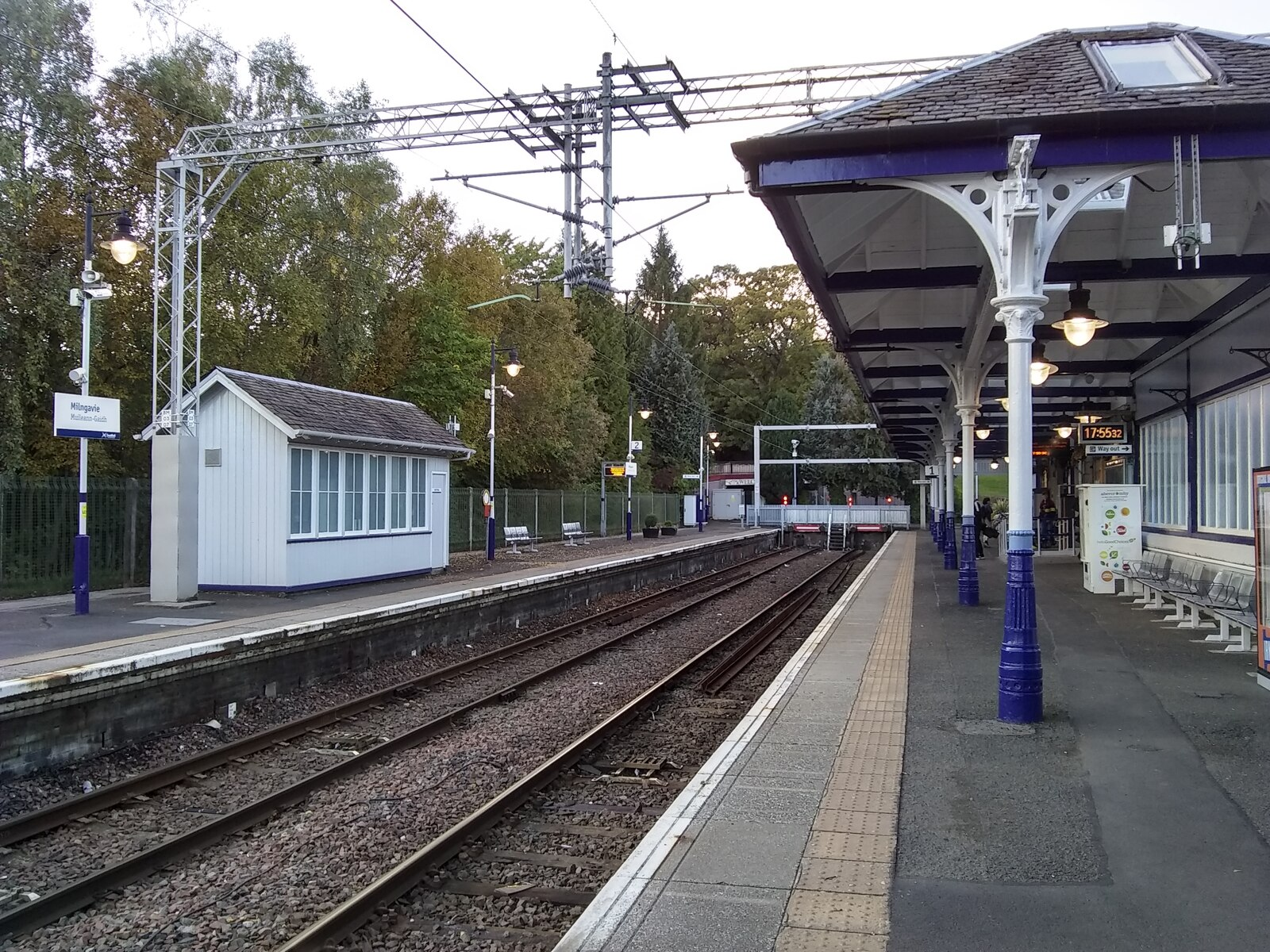

General information
- Location: Milngavie, East Dunbartonshire; Scotland
- Coordinates: 55.9412°N 4.3145°W
- Grid reference: NS555744
- Manager: ScotRail
- Platforms: 2

Other information
- Station code: MLN

Key dates
- April 1863: Opened

Passengers
- 2021/22: ▲0.395 million
- 2022/23: ▲0.549 million
- 2023/24: ▲0.736 million
- 2024/25: ▲0.763 million
- 2025/26: ▲0.785 million
Location
Notes
- Passenger statistics from the Office of Rail and Road

Milngavie railway station serves the town of Milngavie, East Dunbartonshire, near Glasgow in Scotland. The station is sited 9 miles 35 chains (15.2 km) from Glasgow Queen Street, measured via Maryhill. The station is managed by ScotRail, who also operate all services at the station, along the North Clyde and Argyle lines.

Its principal purpose today is as a commuter station for people working in Glasgow city centre. The station itself is a category B listed building.

== History ==
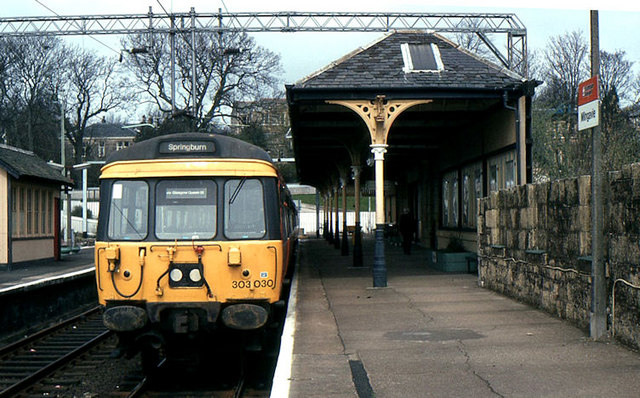
Milngavie station in 1985

The station was opened in April 1863, and was then part of the Glasgow and Milngavie Junction Railway. Originally built with three platforms, one platform has since been removed. The land where the third platform once stood is now used as a footpath and car park. The line was doubled in 1900, but was singled again in 1990.

In December 2020, the platforms were extended at a cost of £5 million. The platform extension allows multiple trains to be stabled at the station, increasing the time available between arrivals and departures.

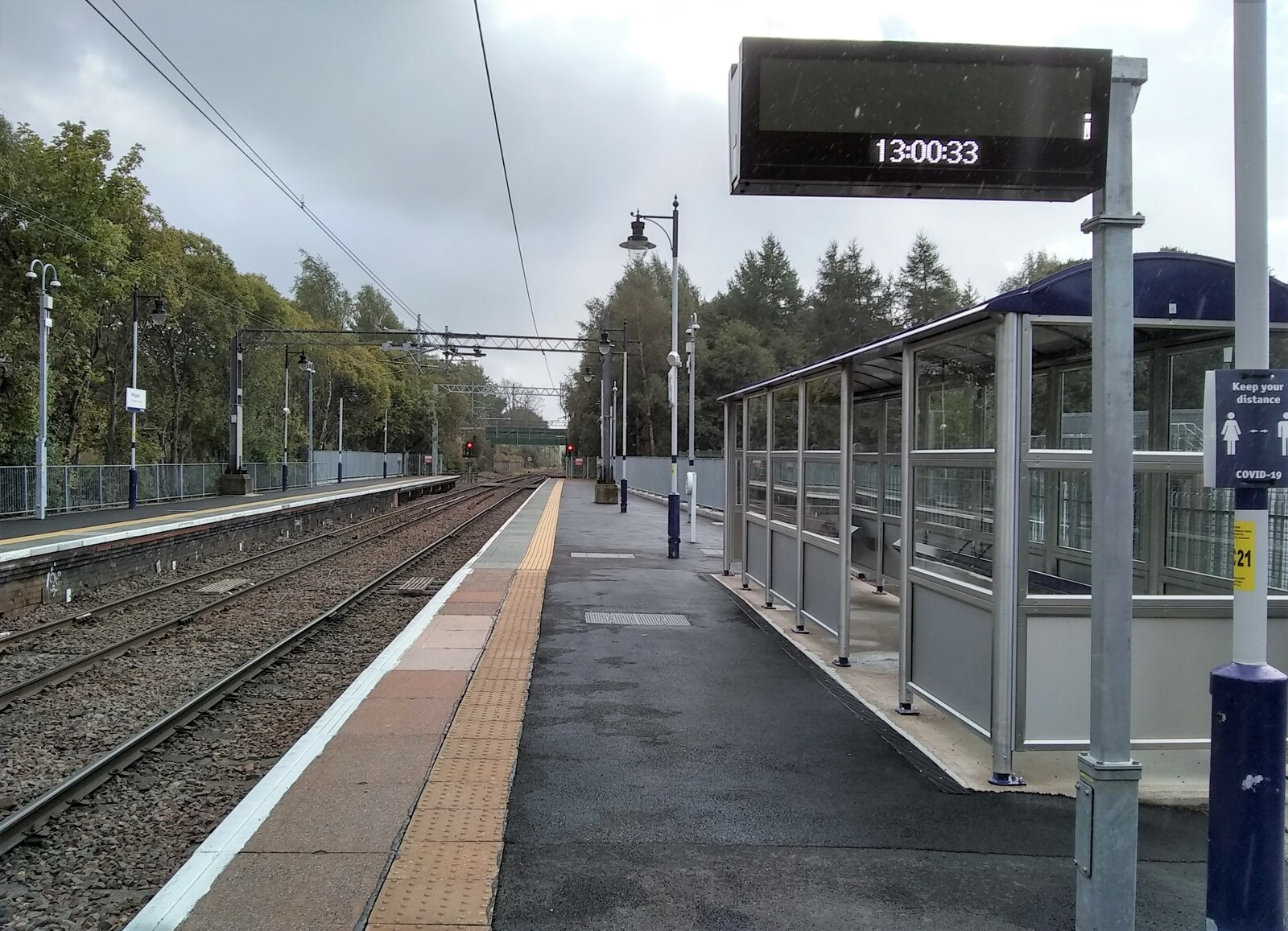
The newly extended platforms

== Location ==
The station is the usual access point for the 154 km (96 mi) long West Highland Way, a long-distance trail which officially starts in Milngavie town centre marked by a granite obelisk. The first few hundred yards of the way follow the former railway line originally built to serve the Ellangowan Paper Mills.

== Facilities ==
The station has a ticket office and ticket machines, an accessible toilet, help points, a snack/coffee trailer on the platform, a payphone, bike racks and benches. There is no taxi rank, but there is a car park and bus stop. A pedestrian underpass links the station to the town centre and the southern end of the West Highland Way long-distance footpath to Fort William. All of the station has step-free access.

== Passenger volume ==
Passenger Volume at Milngavie
| | 2002–03 | 2004–05 | 2005–06 | 2006–07 | 2007–08 | 2008–09 | 2009–10 | 2010–11 | 2011–12 | 2012–13 | 2013–14 | 2014–15 | 2015–16 | 2016–17 | 2017–18 | 2018–19 | 2019–20 | 2020–21 | 2021–22 | 2022–23 |
|---|---|---|---|---|---|---|---|---|---|---|---|---|---|---|---|---|---|---|---|---|
| Entries and exits | 494,809 | 603,024 | 717,154 | 754,346 | 781,321 | 845,146 | 823,618 | 861,082 | 905,468 | 927,382 | 946,907 | 998,354 | 992,202 | 966,286 | 940,026 | 944,960 | 912,674 | 97,076 | 394,948 | 549,066 |

The statistics cover twelve month periods that start in April.

== Services ==
On weekdays and Saturdays, trains run every 30 minutes to Springburn, via Glasgow Queen Street (low level). In the evenings and on Sundays, trains run to Motherwell, via Glasgow Central (low level), at the same twice-hourly frequency.

| Preceding station | National Rail | Following station |
|---|---|---|
| Hillfoot | ScotRail; Argyle Line | Terminus |
| Hillfoot | ScotRail; North Clyde Line | Terminus |
