= Whifflet railway station =

Railway station in North Lanarkshire, Scotland

Whifflet
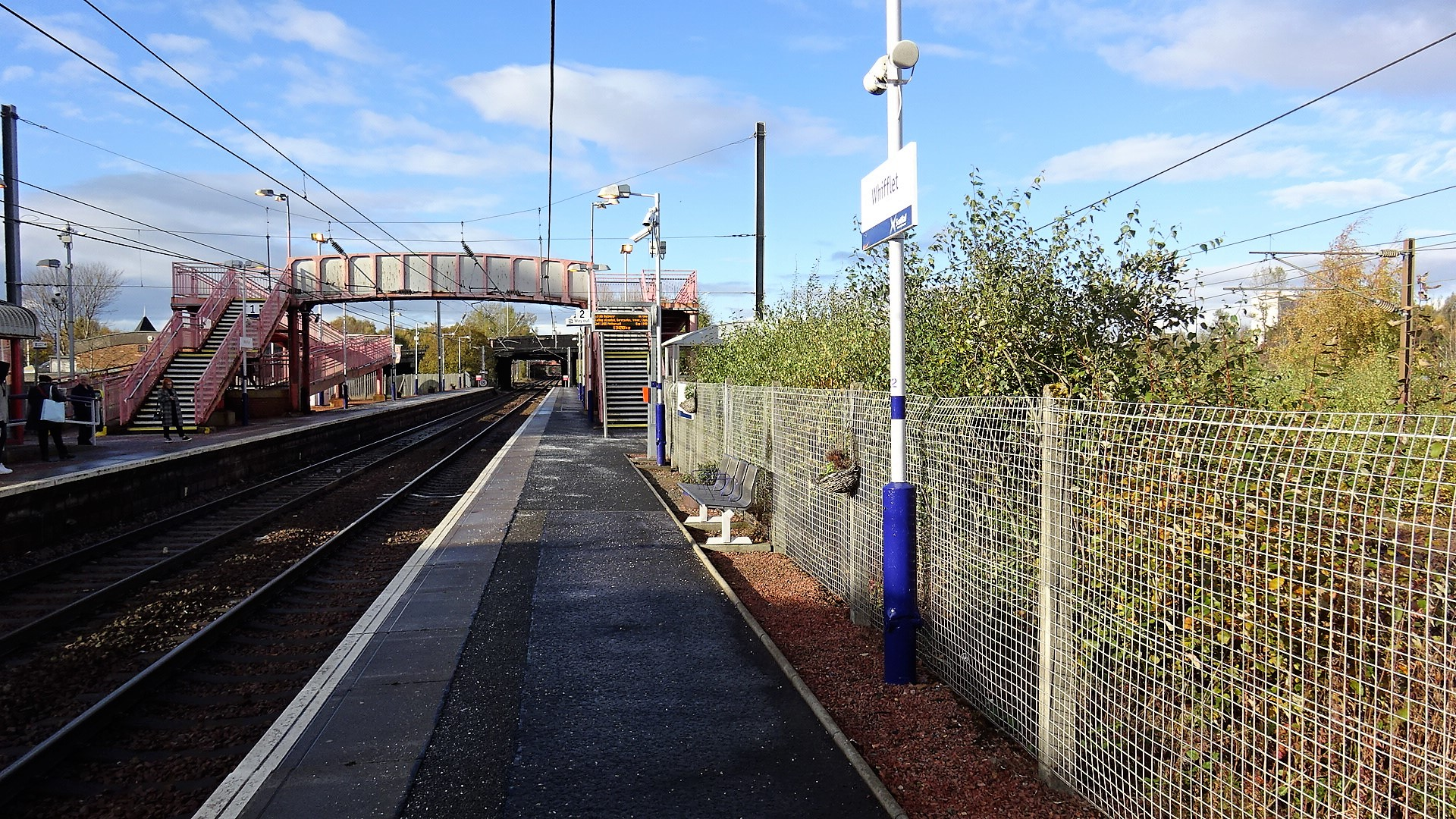

General information
- Location: Coatbridge, North Lanarkshire; Scotland
- Coordinates: 55.8539°N 4.0188°W
- Manager: ScotRail
- Transit authority: SPT
- Platforms: 2

Other information
- Station code: WFF

Key dates
- 21 December 1992: Opened by British Rail

Passengers
- 2021/22: ▲0.124 million
- Interchange: ▲2,817
- 2022/23: ▲0.168 million
- Interchange: ▼2,671
- 2023/24: ▲0.223 million
- Interchange: ▲7,677
- 2024/25: ▲0.245 million
- Interchange: ▲8,876
- 2025/26: ▼0.242 million
- Interchange: ▲9,506
Location
Notes
- Passenger statistics from the Office of Rail and Road

Whifflet railway station is located in the Whifflet area of Coatbridge. Train services are provided by ScotRail. Until December 2014, it was the terminal station on the Whifflet Line, since when it is served by Argyle Line services.

To the east of the station is the link line from the North Clyde Line at Sunnyside Junction. There are no platforms on this line, but it is used by empty EMUs laying over between trips from Glasgow.

== History ==
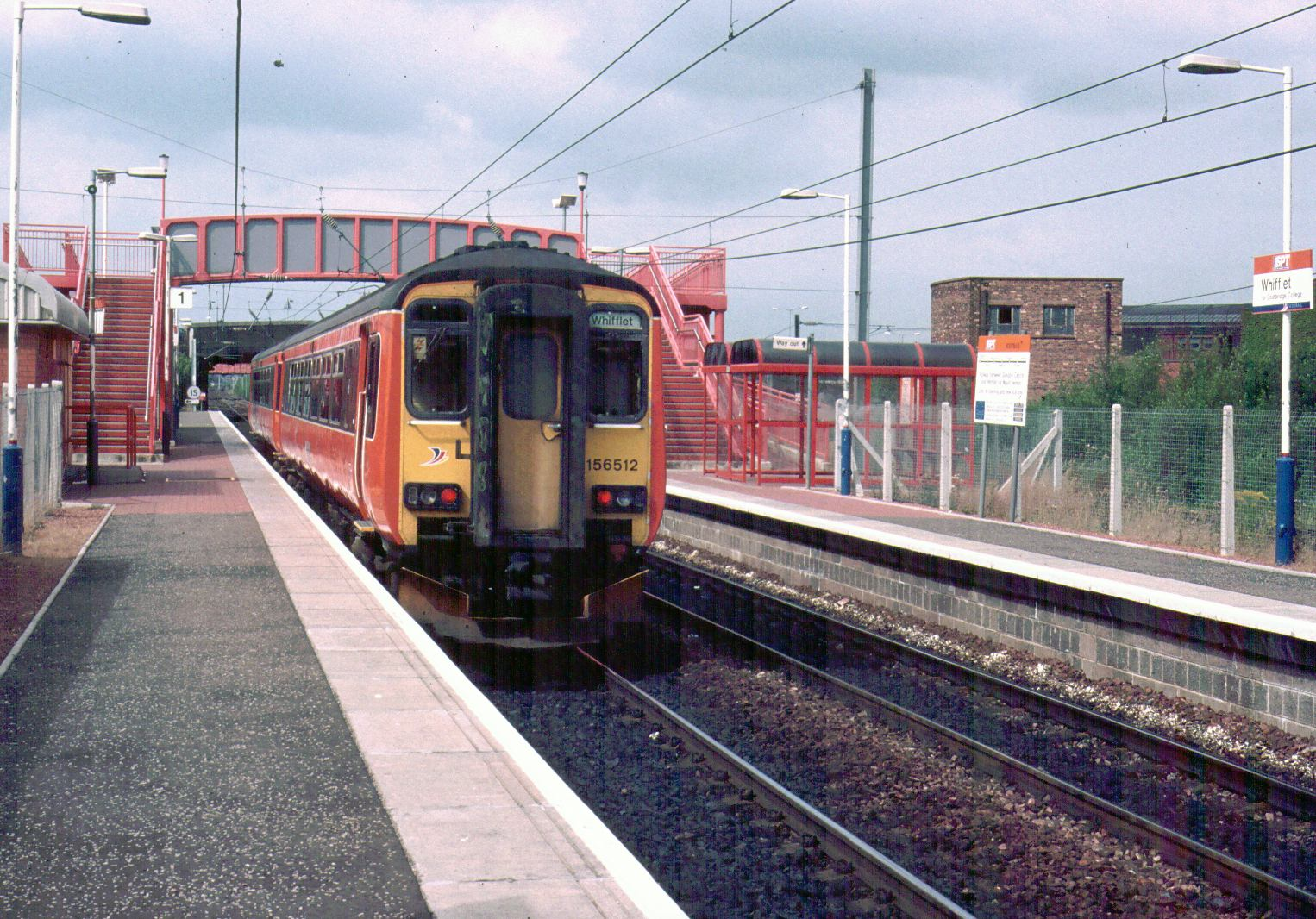
Whifflet station in 1996

The station here became the terminus for the former Rutherglen and Coatbridge Railway route from Glasgow Central when that route reopened to passenger traffic on 4 October 1993. The station on this site is completely new - services originally operated from Glasgow Central High Level to Coatbridge Central over the R&CR route up until their demise (due to the Beeching Axe) on 7 November 1966.

Whifflet had no fewer than three other stations serving it in the past, along with a complex network of routes operated by several different pre-grouping companies (including the Monkland and Kirkintilloch Railway and Garnkirk and Glasgow Railway). All of them - the ex-M&KR/NBR depot on the line from Sunnyside Junction (which was sited a short distance east of the current station) and the Caledonian Railway's bi-level Whifflet Upper and Lower stations (located north of Whifflet North Junction where the two lines crossed) had been shut down by the mid-1960s - the North British station was closed in November 1962, whilst both CR ones closed on 5 October 1964 (though the Upper station had been a terminus since 1943).

When the line from Rutherglen was reopened, using Coatbridge Central as the eastern terminus was ruled out on operational and safety grounds. Trains on the new line would have had to use the single track connection from Langloan West Junction to reach Coatbridge and the use of single lead junctions for new services was discouraged at the time following two recent fatal accidents in the area (at Bellgrove and Newton) involving such layouts. Re-doubling this stretch of line wasn't considered to be economically justifiable, so a route using the double line curve to Whifflet North was chosen, with the station acting as the new terminus for the route in addition to serving the local area.

It has also been a stop on the Motherwell to Cumbernauld Line since the route began operating in 1996 and is now served by Argyle Line electric trains between Motherwell and Cumbernauld via Coatbridge Central, the line through here having been wired in 1981 to provide access to the container terminal at Gartsherrie for electrically hauled freight trains (and subsequently extended north through to Cumbernauld in May 2014 as part of the Cumbernauld Line electrification scheme).

The line to Glasgow was also electrified in 2014. Originally due to be completed prior to the Commonwealth Games being held in the city, it was not commissioned until the December 2014 timetable change. This is still four years earlier than originally planned and has seen the route incorporated into the Argyle Line and freed up the DMUs in use previously for redeployment elsewhere.

== Services ==
=== 2006–2014 ===
The typical off-peak service between 2006 and 2014, prior to services being fully absorbed into the Argyle Line timetable, was:

- thirty-minute service to Glasgow Central via Carmyle operated by Class 158.
- hourly service to Motherwell and Cumbernauld operated by Class 158.

In addition to the services above, the station is served by Argyle Line trains running through to Cumbernauld in the morning and early evening peak hours operated by Class 318 or Class 334.

There was also a service from Glasgow Central through Whifflet on to Shotts on the four Sundays before Christmas 2013.

=== From December 2014 ===
The typical off-peak service every hourly since December 2014 consists of three northbound and three southbound trains:

- From Motherwell to Dalmuir, via Carmyle
- From Cumbernauld to Dalmuir, via Hamilton
- From Milngavie, via Hamilton, to Cumbernauld
- From Dalmuir, via Carmyle, to Motherwell
- Starts at Whifflet to Dalmuir, via Carmyle
- From Dalmuir, via Carmyle, terminating at Whifflet

From 14 December 2014 the station is also served on Sundays regularly for the first time by an hourly service between Balloch and Motherwell.

From 25 May 2026, Lumo services from London Euston to Stirling call here, operated by Class 222s.

Preceding station	National Rail	Following station
Coatbridge Central or Kirkwood	ScotRail; Argyle Line	Motherwell or Terminus
Greenfaulds	Lumo; London Euston to Stirling	Motherwell
	Historical railways	
connection to Wishaw and Coltness Railway	Garnkirk and Glasgow Railway; Caledonian Railway Main Line	Coatbridge Central
Mossend	Wishaw and Coltness Railway; Caledonian Railway Main Line	connection to Garnkirk and Glasgow Railway
Terminus	Rutherglen and Coatbridge Railway; Caledonian Railway	Langloan

== Sources ==
- Butt, R. V. J. (October 1995). The Directory of Railway Stations: details every public and private passenger station, halt, platform and stopping place, past and present (1st ed.). Sparkford: Patrick Stephens Ltd. ISBN 978-1-85260-508-7. OCLC 60251199. OL 11956311M.
- Jowett, Alan (March 1989). Jowett's Railway Atlas of Great Britain and Ireland: From Pre-Grouping to the Present Day (1st ed.). Sparkford: Patrick Stephens Ltd. ISBN 978-1-85260-086-0. OCLC 22311137.
