= Motherwell–Cumbernauld line =

Railway line in Scotland

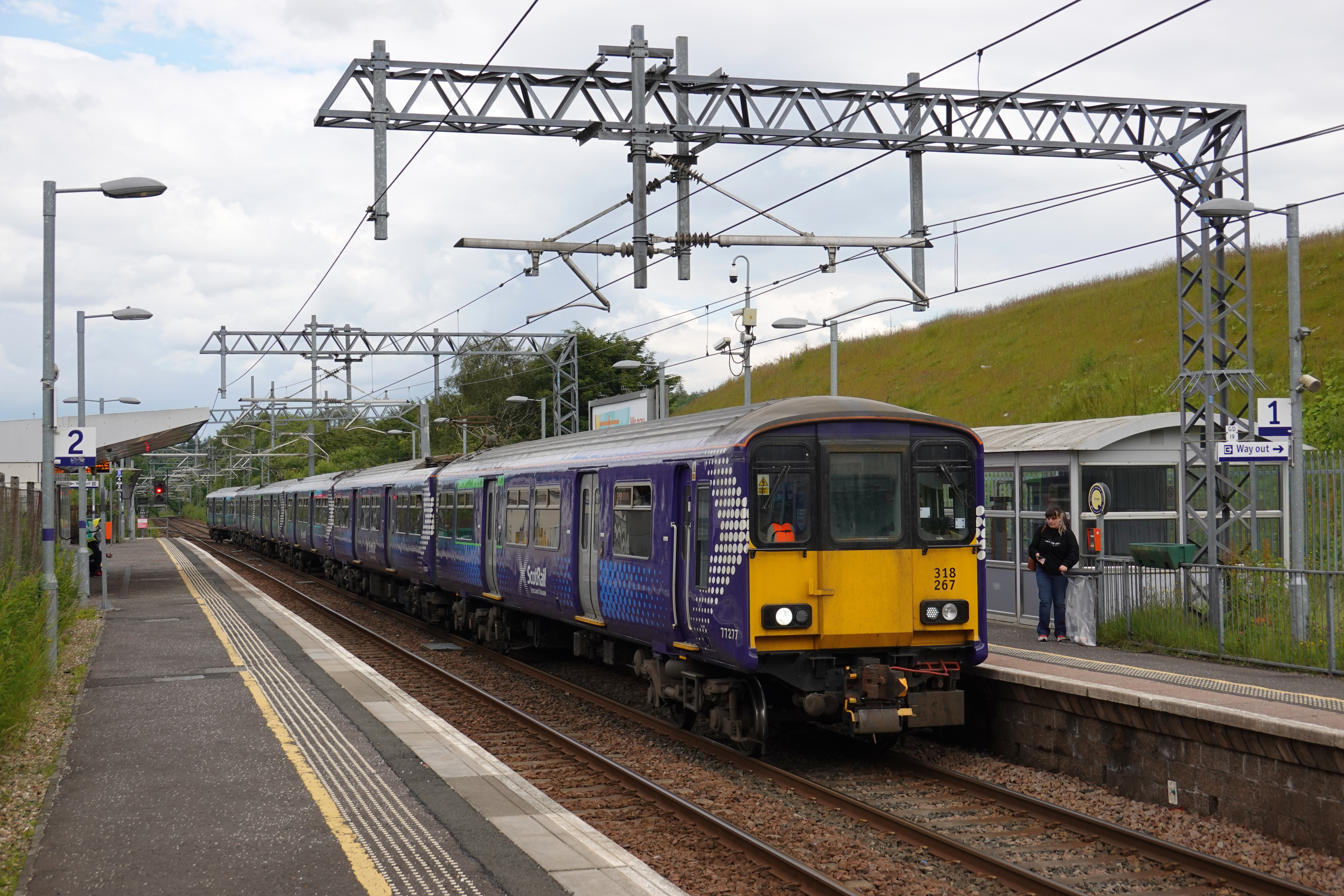
- A Class 318 at Cumbernauld

Overview
- Owner: Network Rail
- Locale: North Lanarkshire; Scotland
- Termini: Motherwell; Cumbernauld
- Stations: 5

Service
- System: National Rail
- Operator(s): ScotRail
- Rolling stock: Class 318; Class 320

History
- Opened: 27 May 1996

Technical
- Track gauge: 4 ft 8 1/2 in (1,435 mm)
Route map
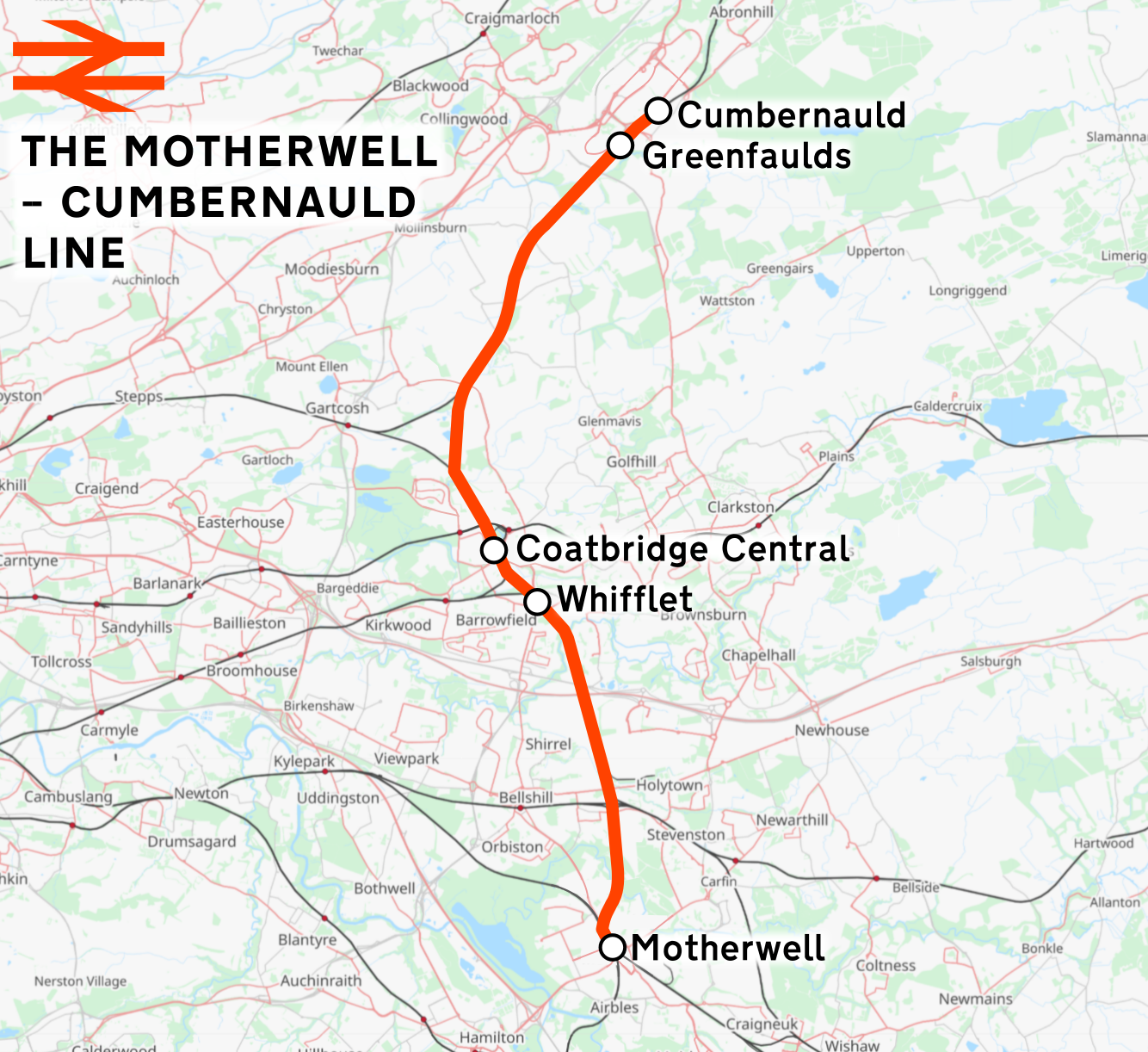
(Click to expand)

The Motherwell–Cumbernauld line is a suburban railway line linking Motherwell and Cumbernauld in Scotland. It is part of the Strathclyde Partnership for Transport network.

== History ==
The line was built as part of the:

- Wishaw and Coltness Railway between Motherwell and Whifflet
- Garnkirk and Glasgow Railway between Whifflet and Gartsherrie South Junction
- Caledonian Main Line between Gartsherrie Junction and Cumbernauld.

The line had previously been used by a limited number of through Inter-City passenger trains between Motherwell and Perth up until the end of the 1980s, having earlier served as part of the Caledonian Railway's main trunk route avoiding Glasgow. The surviving trains (the London Euston to Inverness Clansman daytime through service and the Royal Highlander overnight sleeper) had subsequently been diverted away (via Edinburgh Waverley) by 1990, leaving only the Motherwell–Coatbridge Central section in use by Argyle Line local trains.

In May 1996 the SPT introduced a new timetable on the line, that saw an hourly diesel service through to Cumbernauld alongside an hourly electric service that terminated at Coatbridge Central. Between 1996 & 2000 this was worked by Class 101s. This allowed the Argyle Line services to be re-routed elsewhere from January 2003 (eventually to Lanark via Holytown) whilst offering a new range of journey opportunities for the intermediate stations en route. A limited number of peak-hour electric services via the Hamilton Circle were retained for commuters and these still operate today.

== Infrastructure ==
The line is now electrified at 25 kV AC overhead throughout - the wires having been extended to Cumbernauld from their former limit at Gartsherrie South Junction (north of Coatbridge Central) in the spring of 2014 as part of the Cumbernauld Line electrification scheme. Passenger services are operated by ScotRail on behalf of SPT.

== Services ==
Connections to services on other lines can be made at:

- Cumbernauld and Greenfaulds to the Cumbernauld Line between Falkirk Grahamston and Glasgow Queen Street
- Whifflet to the Whifflet Line to Glasgow Central
- Motherwell to the Argyle Line and services on the WCML, ECML, and North Berwick Line

=== 2006 to 2011 ===
There was an hourly service, usually operated by a Class 156 and calling at all stations. During the peak this was supplemented by Argyle Line services extended from Motherwell to Coatbridge Central.

=== 2011 to May 2014 ===
There was an hourly service, usually operated by a Class 156; however, Class 158 were occasionally sighted. This called at all stations. During the peak this was supplemented by Argyle Line services extended from Motherwell to Coatbridge Central.

=== May to December 2014 ===
There was an hourly service operated by a Class 318 or a Class 320 as the line had by this time been fully electrified. This called at all stations and was supplemented during the peak by Argyle Line services extended from Motherwell to Cumbernauld.

=== December 2014 onwards ===
The hourly EMU service remains in operation, but now fully interworks with Argyle Line services via the Hamilton Circle west of Motherwell. Southbound trains continue via Hamilton & Newton to Dalmuir via Yoker, whilst those in the opposite direction originate at Milngavie.

There is no Sunday service on the route except on the portion between Whifflet & Motherwell (which is served by trains on the Whifflet Line).
