= Scottish Region of British Railways =

Former British Railways operating region

- Region logo from 1965 to 1992
- Franchise: Nationalised operations (1 January 1948 – 31 December 1992)
- Main Region: Scotland
- Parent company: British Rail

The Scottish Region (ScR) was one of the six regions created on British Railways (BR) and consisted of ex-London, Midland and Scottish Railway (LMS) and ex-London and North Eastern Railway (LNER) lines in Scotland. It existed from the creation of BR in 1948, and was renamed to ScotRail in the mid-1980s (see separate entity for details).

== History ==
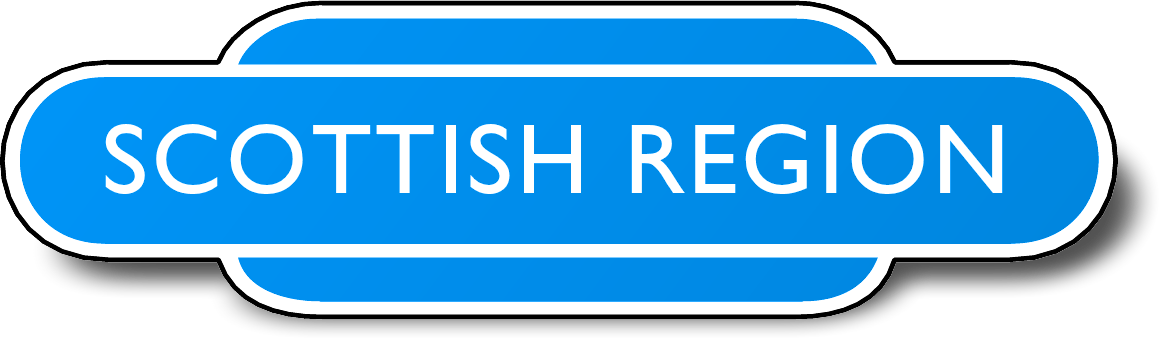
Station totem design prior to 1965

World War II had seriously disrupted Scotland's railways due to the LMS and LNER rolling stock in Scotland being transferred to the major cities in Northern England in order to replace what had been destroyed by German air-raids. At the time, the Government believed that only state intervention could provide the necessary re-supplying of rolling stock and save several unprofitable routes from closure.

Following the election of the Labour government in 1945, the railways were nationalised on 1 January 1948 under the terms of the Transport Act 1947. Through the creation of the Scottish Region of British Railways, all Scotland's railways were brought under a unified system of management for the first time.

The major change to passenger services became apparent in the late 1950s, with the introduction of diesel locomotives, diesel multiple units and the electrification of the Glasgow area local services and the introduction of the "Blue trains", as well as the final withdrawal of steam locomotives in 1967.

During the mid 1960s, many routes were closed under the "Beeching Axe", plus some after the resignation of Dr Richard Beeching - most notoriously the Waverley Line from Edinburgh to Carlisle.

In 1974, cross-border electric Inter-City services from Glasgow Central to London Euston commenced, with the completion of the West Coast Main Line electrification project. In 1979 the Argyle Line project saw the reopening and electrification of the railway line through Glasgow Central Low Level station. The Glasgow Central to Ayr line was electrified in 1986. The one closure of this period was the Kilmacolm line in 1983.

The Edinburgh Waverley - Glasgow Queen Street service was operated by diesel multiple units from the late 1950s until 1970, when "push-pull" trains of Mark 2 carriages with a Class 27 diesel locomotive at each end were introduced. These were replaced by Class 47 locomotives and Mark 3 carriages in 1979. These were in turn replaced by Class 156 then Class 158 units in the early 1990s.

== The network ==
The Scottish Region covered all of Scotland's railways. These would be greatly reduced in the 1960s.

Its most important stations were:

- Glasgow Central and Queen Street in Glasgow,
- Motherwell in North Lanarkshire,
- Waverley station and Haymarket in Edinburgh,
- Dumfries in Dumfriesshire,
- Aberdeen in Aberdeenshire
- Perth in Perthshire,
- Dundee city,
- Stirling in Stirlingshire,
- Inverness in Inverness-shire.

The Scottish Region had boundaries with the North Eastern Region near Berwick-upon-Tweed and the London Midland Region near Gretna.

== The Beeching cuts ==
Notable line closures in the Scottish Region during the 1960s were:

- Stanley Junction to Kinnaber Junction (The Strathmore Route)
- Aberdeen to Ballater
- Aviemore to Forres
- Connel Ferry to Ballachulish
- Dumfries to Stranraer (the 'Port Road' along the lines of the Castle Douglas and Dumfries Railway and the Portpatrick and Wigtownshire Joint Railway)
- Dunblane to Crianlarich
- Dyce to Fraserburgh and Peterhead (the Formartine and Buchan Railway)
- Fife Coast Line (Thornton to Leuchars via Elie, Crail and St Andrews). Part of this has been reopened as the Levenmouth rail link, but Leven station is on a new site, and is a dead end terminus on a previously freight only line.
- Gleneagles to Crieff
- Carlisle to Edinburgh via Hawick (the 'Waverley Route'). The northern section of this route has since been reopened as the Borders Railway.

Lines proposed for closure in the Beeching Report, but which escaped the axe and remain open to this day include:

- Inverness to Kyle of Lochalsh, Wick and Thurso (the Far North Line)
- Ayr to Stranraer (the Glasgow South Western Line)

== Trains and rolling stock ==
=== Main public services ===
Steam traction ended in the 1960s with the introduction of diesel trains, and 25 kV electric trains on the Glasgow Suburban network. The new electric 'Blue trains' with air-operated sliding doors were introduced during the early 1960s and were a great success. In the 1960s diesel multiple units replaced many formerly steam locomotive hauled services, though in the 1970s and 1980s the primary routes between Edinburgh, Glasgow, Aberdeen and Inverness were operated by diesel locomotive-hauled trains, largely using Mk2, and in the 1980s on the Edinburgh - Glasgow services Mk3, coaches. Other than a few DMU trials, the scenic rural routes such as the West Highland and Far North lines were operated by diesel locomotive hauled trains up until the 1990s, mostly still using steam-era Mk1 rolling stock.

=== Heritage operations ===
Scotland's scenic routes have always been popular destinations for enthusiast tours and other special trains utilising heritage rolling stock and hauled by steam or historic diesel locomotives. During the 1970s and 1980s, it was common for charter trains to come up from the West Midlands or North West (many organised by the Locomotive Club of Great Britain) for enthusiast tours lasting for a full weekend, with passengers sleeping on the trains during overnight segments, and with the locomotive(s) being changed very frequently to give the passengers as much variety as possible. Starting in the 1970s and continuing to the present day the Scottish Railway Preservation Society operates a regular programme of steam and diesel tours using their preserved rake of 1950s/60s BR Mk1 coaches, which include very luxurious side-corridor compartment stock, one of the very few main-line operators in the UK to offer such coaches. In addition, other UK railtour operators still operate trains to Scottish destinations from English cities, again using historic rolling stock and motive power.

== Major accidents ==
- Paisley Gilmour Street rail crash of 16 April 1979 - killed 7.
- Invergowrie rail crash of 22 October 1979 - killed 5.
- Polmont rail crash of 30 July 1984 - killed 13.
- Glasgow Bellgrove rail crash of 6 March 1989 - killed 2.
- Newton rail crash of 21 July 1991 - killed 4.

== Privatisation ==
With the privatisation of British Rail, the railway infrastructure of the Scottish Region came under the Scotland Zone of Railtrack. Passenger services within Scotland were franchised to National Express, under the name "ScotRail Railways", although it was still referred to as ScotRail, the name that the BRB used in its later years of operation.
