= Coatbridge Central railway station =

Railway station in North Lanarkshire, Scotland

Coatbridge Central Scottish Gaelic: Coatbridge Meadhain
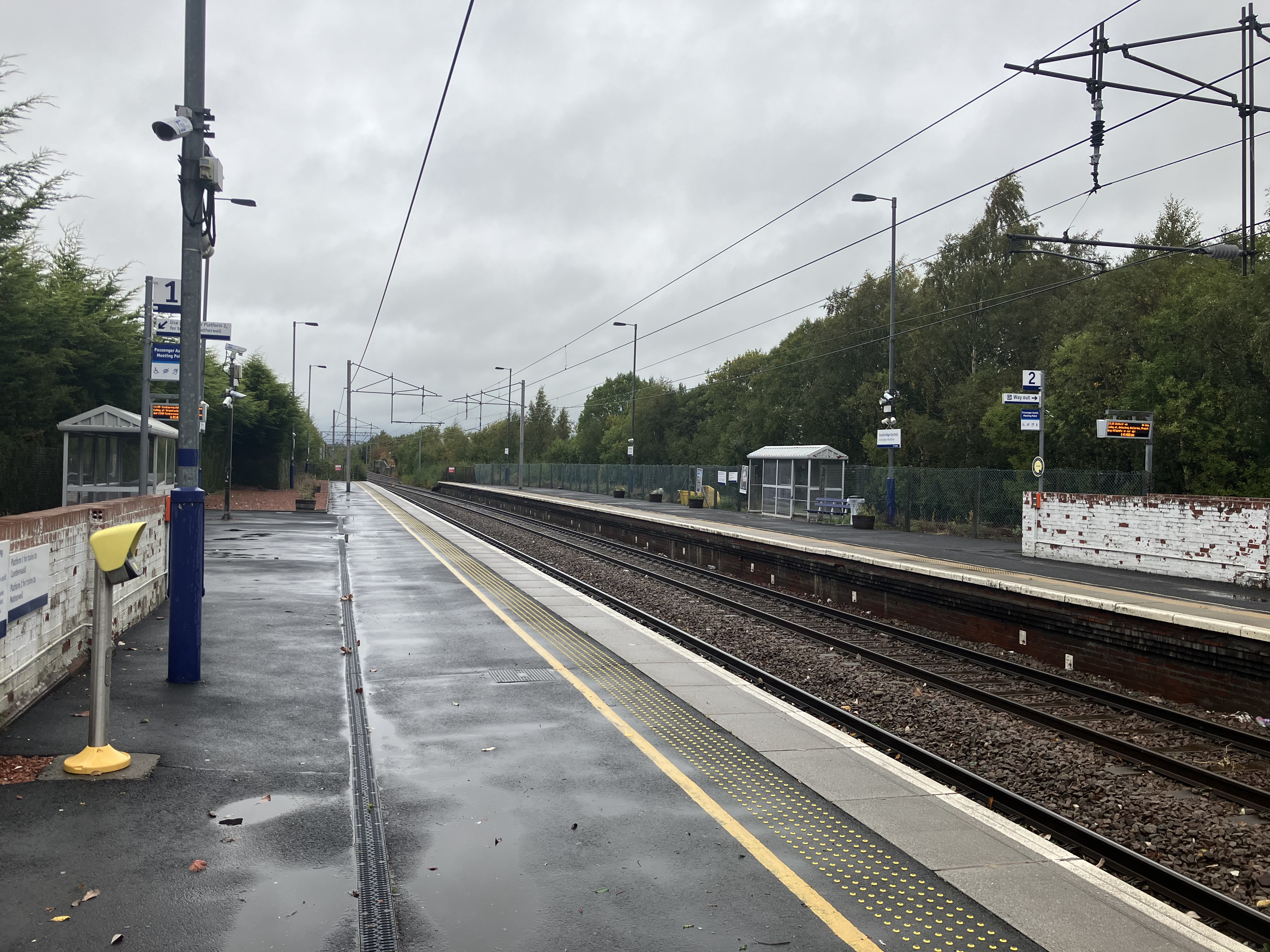

General information
- Location: Coatbridge, North Lanarkshire; Scotland
- Coordinates: 55.8629°N 4.0323°W
- Grid reference: NS729651
- Manager: ScotRail
- Transit authority: SPT
- Platforms: 2

Other information
- Station code: CBC

History
- Original company: Garnkirk and Glasgow Railway
- Pre-grouping: Caledonian Railway
- Post-grouping: LMS

Key dates
- March 1842: Opened as Coatbridge
- 8 June 1953: Renamed as Coatbridge Central

Passengers
- 2021/22: ▲22,980
- 2022/23: ▲34,102
- 2023/24: ▲41,514
- 2024/25: ▲45,164
- 2025/26: ▼44,338
Location
Notes
- Passenger statistics from the Office of Rail and Road

Coatbridge Central railway station is a station in Coatbridge, North Lanarkshire, Scotland. It is on the Argyle Line. Train services are provided by ScotRail.

== Architecture and history ==
The station was originally named Coatbridge and opened in 1842. It was renamed Coatbridge Central in 1953 after the 1826 Monkland and Kirkintilloch Railway station named Coatbridge Central closed in 1951. It is on what was originally the Garnkirk and Glasgow Railway, which later became the Glasgow, Garnkirk and Coatbridge Railway. The connection southwards came courtesy of the Wishaw and Coltness Railway, with their first passenger train arriving from Morningside in May 1845. Both companies were taken over by the Caledonian Railway in 1849. A further route to the station, the Rutherglen and Coatbridge Railway from Glasgow via Rutherglen and Carmyle, was opened in August 1866.

The existing station layout is the result of a re-build by the Caledonian Railway in 1900, but the platform level buildings were demolished in the 1970s when the station was a likely candidate for closure due to dwindling patronage and services. Trains from Glasgow Buchanan Street over the original GG&CR route had ceased in November 1962, whilst those over the R&CR were withdrawn four years later due to the Beeching Axe, leaving only a skeleton service between Motherwell and Stirling/Perth to call here. However, for much of the 1970s and early to mid 1980s this consisted of a pair of through long-distance expresses between London Euston and Inverness—the daytime Clansman (via Birmingham New Street) and overnight Royal Highlander sleeper—along with a mid-morning Perth to Motherwell passenger & parcels train and evening northbound return working that started back at Carlisle.

All of these workings had been either withdrawn or diverted by 1987, but by then Strathclyde PTE had introduced a regular local service from Motherwell as an extension of the Argyle Line's Hamilton Circle route (the line through here had been electrified by British Rail in 1981 to allow electrically hauled freight trains to access the nearby Gartsherrie container terminal). The link northwards to Cumbernauld was re-established in 1996 when the Motherwell to Cumbernauld DMU service was inaugurated. That provided the main service from the station up until the May 2014 timetable change, as Argyle Line trains only called here at peak periods. Electrification was extended north to Cumbernauld in 2014 as part of the Edinburgh to Glasgow Improvement Programme upgrade scheme, and thereafter all passenger trains began to be worked by EMUs. Following a timetable recast in December 2014, Motherwell services once again run on through via the Hamilton Circle to the city's north west suburbs throughout the day.

Access to the station is now by a ramp from West Canal Street leading to the Down (Cumbernauld bound) platform with access to the Motherwell-bound island platform via the original underpass. Original access to both platforms of the station was via this underpass from the category C(S) listed two-floor structure at the end of the station. The main building was disused for many years after the removal of staffing in the 1970s, but was renovated in the early 2000s and used initially as a public house and more recently as commercial premises for an office supplies company.

With a container terminal just north of the station, and the location on link between the West Coast Main Line and the lines to Grangemouth, Stirling and points north, there are also freight trains passing through the station.

== Facilities ==
Amenities here are somewhat basic: the station is unstaffed, and no permanent buildings remain on the platforms apart from standard waiting shelters. There are timetable poster boards and customer help points on each platform. CCTV cameras and an automatic announcement system are also installed here. Step-free access is only possible on platform 2, as the underpass to the opposite side has steps.

== Passenger services ==
=== 2006-2014 ===
An hourly train operates to Motherwell and Cumbernauld Mondays to Saturdays. This is operated as a Class 156 diagram.

There are a few peak time services on the Argyle Line which terminate at the station, operated by a mixture of Class 318, Class 334 and Class 320 trains. These services call at Whifflet before joining the "main" Argyle line at Motherwell, operating to Milngavie and Dalmuir.

=== 2023 ===
On Monday to Saturdays, There is an hourly service to both Dalmuir and Cumbernauld with extra trains running at peak times

As of 2023, there is no Sunday service leaving it the only station in the Strathclyde area not to have such.

Preceding station	National Rail	Following station
Greenfaulds	ScotRail; Argyle Line	Whifflet
	Historical railways	
Glenboig	Caledonian Railway; Main Line	Whifflet
