= Carnbroe railway station =

Short-lived railway station in Carnbroe, Scotland

Coordinates: 55.8505°N 4.0131°W

Carnbroe

General information
- Location: Carnbroe, North Lanarkshire; Scotland

Other information
- Status: Disused

History
- Original company: Wishaw and Coltness Railway
- Pre-grouping: Wishaw and Coltness Railway

Key dates
- 5 May 1843: Opened
- 1846: Closed

Carnbroe railway station served the ironworks in the neighbourhood of Carnbroe, North Lanarkshire, Scotland, from 1843 to 1846 on the Wishaw and Coltness Railway.

== History ==
The station was opened on 5 May 1843 by the Wishaw and Coltness Railway. It was mentioned as Carnbroe Ironworks when it first appeared in the company timetable, although it was amended on 3 June 1844. It was a short-lived station, closing three years later in 1846.

Preceding station	Disused railways	Following station
Terminus	Wishaw and Coltness Railway	Holytown; Line and station closed
