= Newton (South Lanarkshire) rail accident =

1991 railway incident in South Lanarkshire, Scotland

Coordinates: 55°49′9″N 4°8′16″W

Newton Rail Crash

Details
- Date: 21 July 1991
- Location: near Newton, South Lanarkshire
- Country: Scotland
- Line: Argyle Line/Cathcart Circle Line; Strathclyde Passenger Transport (West Coast Main Line)
- Cause: SPAD, inadequate junction layout

Statistics
- Trains: 2
- Deaths: 4
- Injured: 22

On 21 July 1991, two commuter trains crashed just west of Newton railway station in Cambuslang, near Glasgow, Scotland. The junction had been remodelled in the month previous to the crash.

== Accident ==
At 21.55, train 2P55, the 21:55 Newton-Glasgow Central Cathcart Circle service, a British Rail Class 303 unit driven by Reginald McEwan left the "down" platform at Newton. Meanwhile, train 2J66, the 20:55 Balloch-Motherwell service, a Class 314 unit driven by David Scott was crossing from the fast West Coast Main Line tracks through a single-lead junction to enter the "up" platform. The two trains collided head on at the junction, killing both drivers and two passengers and injuring 22. The Class 303 unit overrode the buffer unit of the Class 314 unit and the trains telescoped over one another. The leading coach of the Class 314 was completely destroyed (being cut up at the site) later replaced by a redundant Class 507 driving motor vehicle.

People who lived in the area near to the crash described hearing something that sounded "like an explosion" and soon 400 people had gathered at the crash site. One local ran to Newton to telephone the signaller on duty and had asked him to turn the overhead wires off as he had feared for the safety of everyone.

== Factors ==
Schematic of the trackwork of the Newton (South Lanarkshire) rail crash. The red line indicates the line that was removed to make a single lead junction. This line was replaced after the crash.

A report into the crash was commissioned by British Rail, which started on 23 July 1991 and reported to the Health and Safety Executive, who published a report in November 1992. A separate fatal crash inquiry team, composed of the Sheriff's court of Glasgow, were taken to the crash site by train in February 1993. They rode in train from the low level platform at Glasgow Central to the crash site at Newton and they were then bussed to the signalling centre which controlled the points and lights at Newton at the time of the crash.

The crash was attributed to the Cathcart Circle train passing a signal at danger and causing a collision at the single-lead junction, as at Bellgrove in Glasgow just over a year earlier. The junction's configuration was newly installed at a cost of £5 million and designed to be simpler than the double-lead junction that it replaced. This allowed faster running on the WCML following the East Coast electrification (through Carstairs) but was inherently less safe. The configuration was unnecessarily constrained and was strongly criticised in the crash report and by contemporary commentators (Hall 1999).

== Aftermath ==
Following the crash the junction was closed, with a special timetable in place for several months while the layout was revised to provide double track from the platforms towards Kirkhill. Diversions included West Coast Main Line trains being diverted via the Rutherglen and Coatbridge Railway and Whifflet with electric trains hauled by diesel locomotives to Mossend Yard, East Coast Main Line trains terminating at Edinburgh Waverley, and Lanark and Motherwell trains being diverted along the North Clyde Line via the Whifflet link line immediately west of Coatbridge Sunnyside.

After the crash, the track that had been removed was replaced immediately and it remains there to this day.

== See also ==
- Original double junction
- Single-lead junction

== Sources ==
- Stephen, Paul (20 July 2016). "Newton station's blackest day". Rail Magazine. ISSN 0953-4563.
- Vaughan, Adrian (2000). Tracks to Disaster. Ian Allan. ISBN 0-7110-2985-7.
- Hall, Stanley (1999). Hidden Dangers. Ian Allan. ISBN 0-7137-1973-7.
- Railways Archive account and official accident report
