= Motherwell railway station =

Railway station in North Lanarkshire, Scotland

Motherwell Scottish Gaelic: Tobar na Màthar
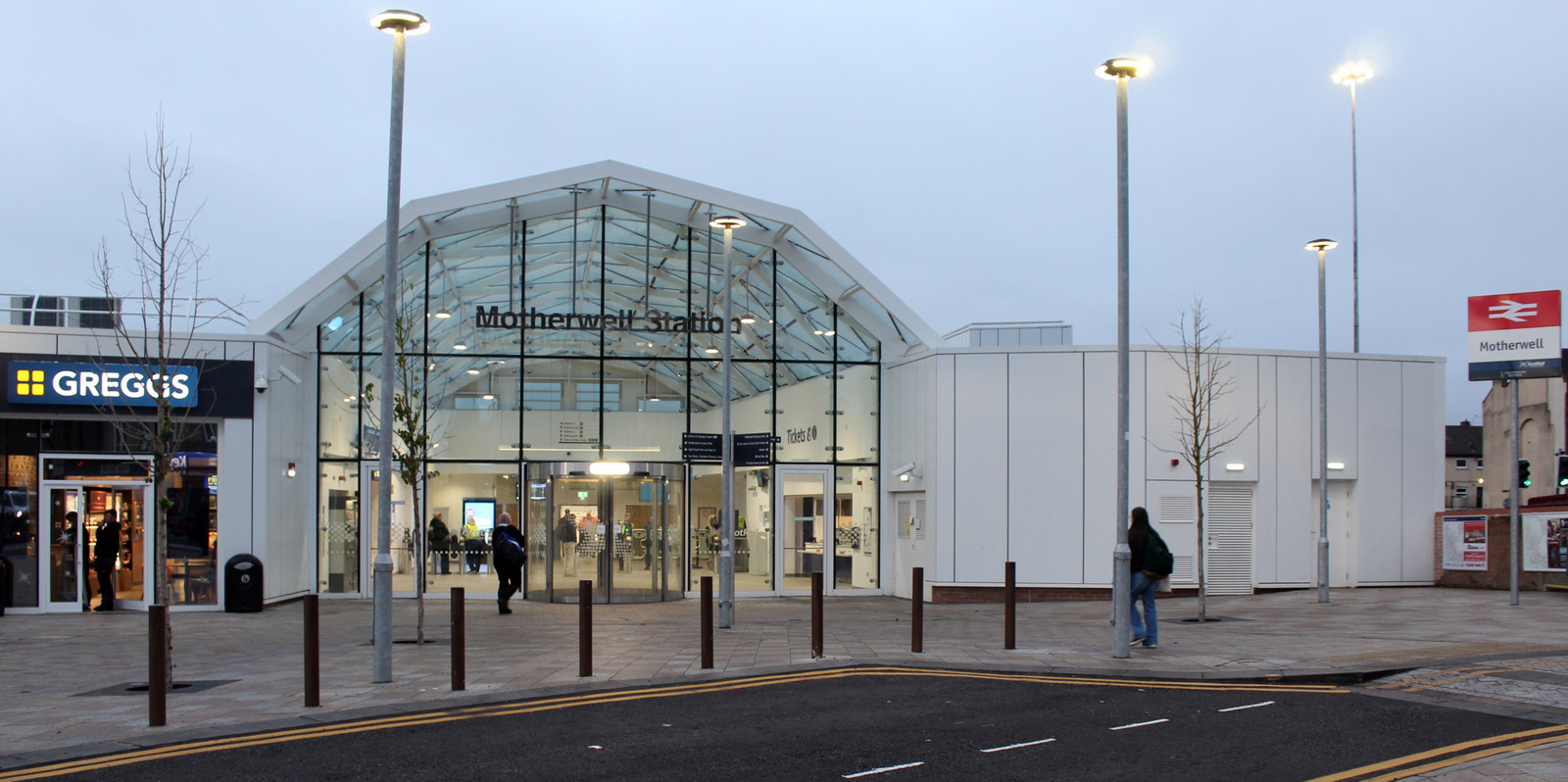
- Motherwell station exterior

General information
- Location: Motherwell, North Lanarkshire, Scotland
- Coordinates: 55.791570°N 3.994208°W
- Grid reference: NS750571
- Owner: Network Rail
- Manager: ScotRail
- Transit authority: Strathclyde Partnership for Transport
- Platforms: 4

Other information
- Station code: MTH

Passengers
- 2021/22: ▲0.546 million
- Interchange: ▲67,344
- 2022/23: ▲0.699 million
- Interchange: ▲72,468
- 2023/24: ▲0.918 million
- Interchange: ▲90,509
- 2024/25: ▲1.049 million
- Interchange: ▲0.100 million
- 2025/26: ▲1.140 million
- Interchange: ▲0.118 million
Location
Notes
- Passenger statistics from the Office of Rail and Road

Motherwell railway station serves the town of Motherwell, in North Lanarkshire, Scotland. It is on the West Coast Main Line (WCML) and is served also by Argyle Line trains of the Glasgow suburban railway network. It is the penultimate stop on the WCML northbound before Glasgow Central. The station has four through platforms and is adjacent to Motherwell Shopping Centre.

== History ==
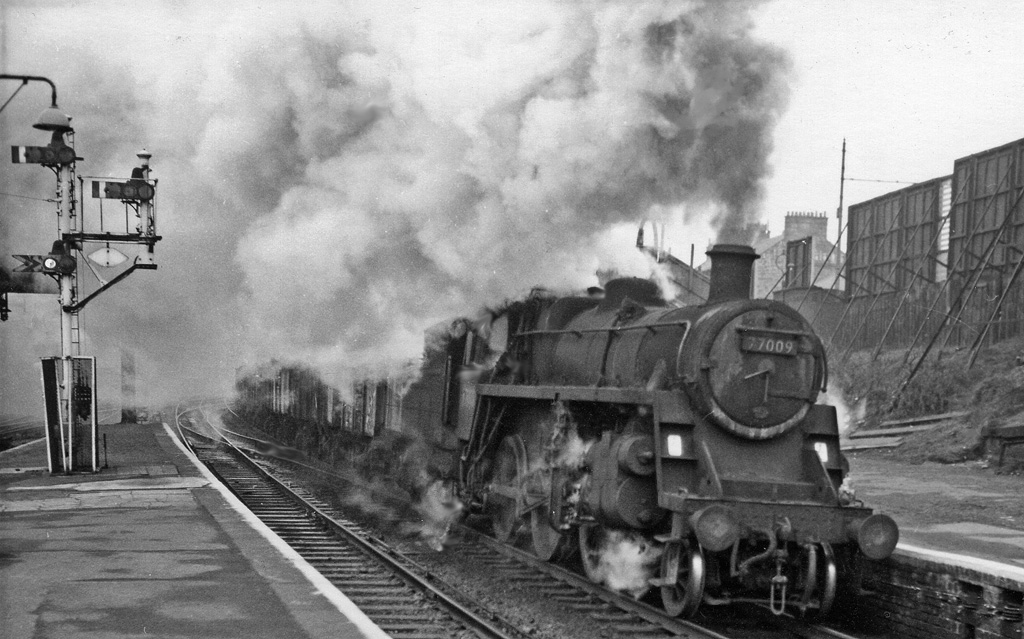
View northward towards Glasgow Central in 1966

The first station in Motherwell was opened by the Wishaw and Coltness Railway on 8 May 1843 and was located at Orbiston. As Orbiston station was quite some distance from the rapidly expanding Motherwell town centre, the decision was taken by the Caledonian Railway to build a station at 'Lesmahagow Junction', the point where the Motherwell Deviation branch of the Caledonian Railway Main Line met the lines to Mossend, Hamilton and Lesmahagow. That Motherwell station was opened on 31 July 1885, on a site conveniently in the heart of the town which replaced the original station.

The current station was built by British Rail during the 1970s, on the same site, to coincide with the completion of electrification of the West Coast Main Line from Carlisle to Glasgow, which was completed in 1974.

== Layout ==
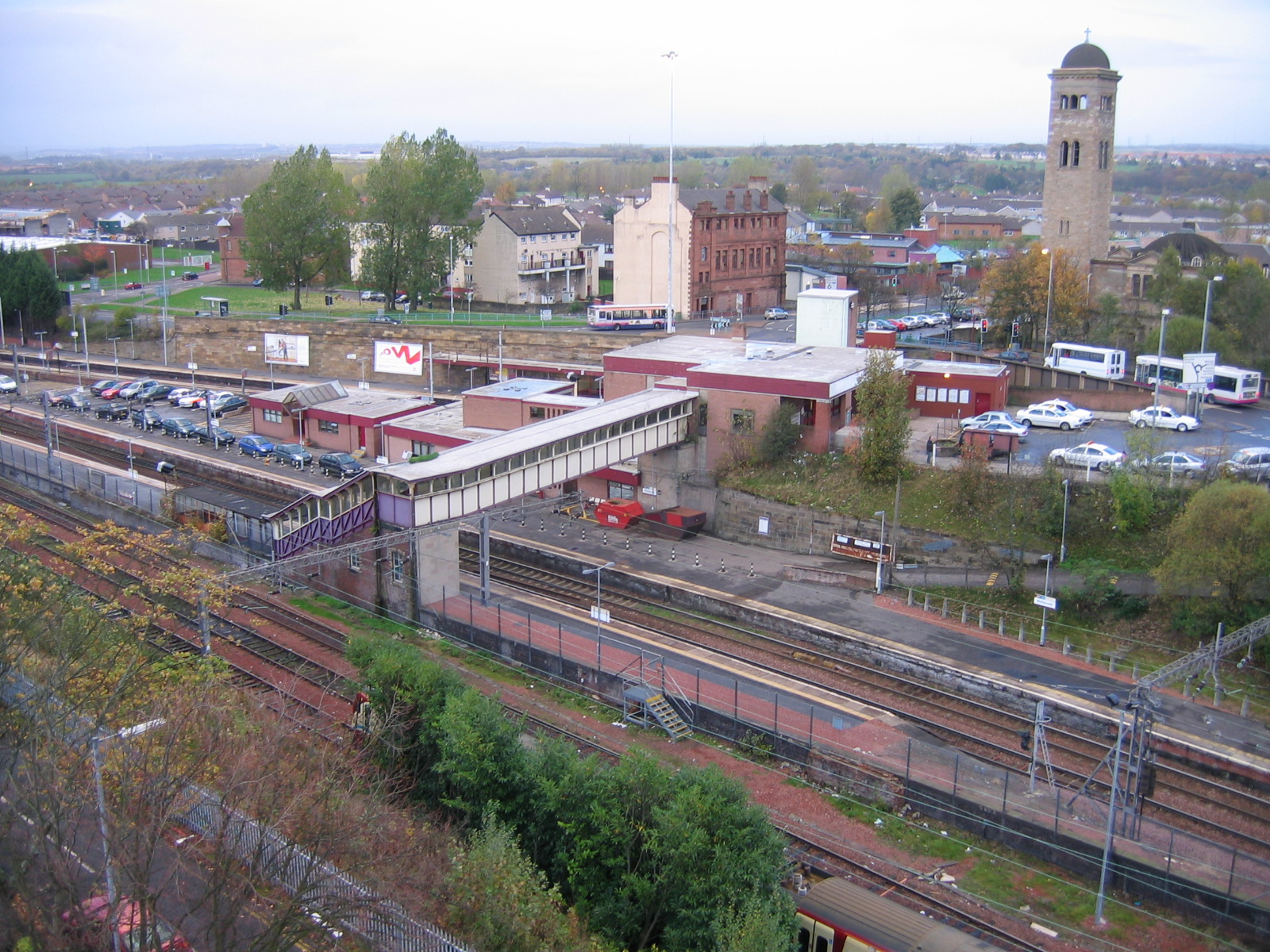
Motherwell looking from the south, with stabling sidings in the foreground; platform 4 is closest to the camera. The main concourse has since been completely redeveloped, and the bridge replaced with one that is DDA compliant

The station has four through platforms, crossed by two overbridges with the main buildings being above the level of the line between platforms 2 and 3. At platform level between platforms 2 and 3, there is also a ScotRail train crew depot, staff car park and an office of the British Transport Police. These are accessible via a gated rampway leading to street level.

Beyond platform 4 are some electrified sidings, used for the stabling of trains overnight. Diagrams are nominally worked so that these units will only stay at Motherwell for one night before returning to their allocated depot.

== Services ==
The station is served by six train operating companies, which provide the following services:

- ScotRail provides local services; the majority of northbound services serve Glasgow Central (either terminating at the High Level station or passing through the Low Level station en route to Dalmuir or Milngavie). Southbound Argyle Line services terminate at Lanark. There are six trains per day to Edinburgh Waverley, via Carstairs, and a further early morning service to Edinburgh Waverley via Shotts.
- Avanti West Coast provides nine services on weekdays northbound towards Glasgow Central, with seven at weekends. Southbound, there are 11 trains per day to London Euston, including three via Birmingham New Street.
- CrossCountry runs three trains per day to Glasgow Central and two per day to Plymouth, via Edinburgh Waverley, York, Birmingham New Street and Bristol Temple Meads. On Sundays only, two services runs eastbound to Edinburgh, with one continuing to Newcastle.
- TransPennine Express provides a two-hourly service in each direction between Glasgow Central and Manchester Airport. There are also two trains per day to Liverpool Lime Street.
- Caledonian Sleeper provides one train per day in each direction between Glasgow Central and London Euston.
- Lumo services from London Euston to Stirling call here, operated by Class 222s. They took over the rights from Open-access operator Grand Union Trains.

Glasgow Central can be reached via trains from three different platforms going in two different directions. Glasgow is geographically north-west of Motherwell, but trains can depart via the West Coast Main Line in the Motherwell deviation going north, or by the Hamilton Circle going south. The same can also be said for services to Lanark, which is south-east of Motherwell. Trains can depart towards Lanark going south via Shieldmuir or initially north via Holytown; the latter route has not been normally used for timetabled trains since the December 2014 timetable alterations.

During times of disruption such as the closure of the West Coast Main Line between Uddingston and Law Junction for engineering works, Avanti West Coast and CrossCountry services can be diverted along the Hamilton Circle and Wishaw Deviation. CrossCountry services are also able to divert to Edinburgh via the Shotts line, in which case they use platforms 3 and 4. If all the routes through the station are closed, then a replacement bus service is operated from Motherwell; passengers from Glasgow are advised to travel to Edinburgh from Queen Street instead of Central station.

Preceding station	National Rail	Following station
Carlisle	Avanti West Coast; West Coast Main Line	Glasgow Central
Lockerbie	Avanti West Coast; West Coast Main Line	Glasgow Central
Lockerbie	TransPennine Express; Manchester/Lancaster–Glasgow	Glasgow Central
Lockerbie	TransPennine Express; Preston–Glasgow	Glasgow Central
Carstairs	TransPennine Express; Preston–Glasgow	Glasgow Central
Carstairs	Caledonian Sleeper; Lowland Caledonian Sleeper	Glasgow Central
Haymarket	CrossCountry; Cross Country Network	Glasgow Central
Lockerbie	Lumo; London Euston to Stirling	Whifflet
Airbles	ScotRail; Argyle Line	Whifflet
Airbles	ScotRail; Argyle Line	Bellshill
Shieldmuir	ScotRail; Argyle Line	Bellshill
Shieldmuir	ScotRail; Argyle Line	Uddingston
Terminus	ScotRail; Motherwell–Cumbernauld line	Whifflet
	Historical railways	
Ferniegair; Line and station open (except section between Ferniegair and Ross Junction)	Coalburn Branch; Caledonian Railway	Terminus
Hamilton Central; Line and station open	Hamilton Branch; Caledonian Railway	Terminus
Terminus	Clydesdale Junction Railway	Uddingston; Line and station open
Flemington; Line open; station closed	Wishaw and Coltness Railway; CR Main Line	Mossend; Line open; station closed

== Future developments ==
Open-access operator Grand Union Trains plans to use the station on a Stirling to London Euston service to begin in 2025.
