= Mossend railway station =

Disused railway station in Mossend, North Lanarkshire

Mossend

General information
- Location: Mossend, North Lanarkshire; Scotland
- Coordinates: 55.8205°N 3.9952°W
- Grid reference: NS750603
- Platforms: 2 (initially) 4 (after resiting) 2 (closed later)

Other information
- Status: Disused

History
- Original company: Wishaw and Coltness Railway
- Pre-grouping: Caledonian Railway
- Post-grouping: London, Midland and Scottish Railway

Key dates
- 8 May 1843: Opened as Holytown
- 1 June 1882: Name changed to Mossend
- 5 November 1962: Closed
Location

Mossend railway station served the town of Mossend, North Lanarkshire, Scotland, from 1843 to 1962 on the Wishaw and Coltness Railway.

== History ==
=== First station ===
The first station was opened as Holytown on 8 May 1843 by the Wishaw and Coltness Railway, although it had opened earlier to goods on 25 January 1834. It was replaced by a new station to the north on 1 June 1882.

=== Second station ===
The second station opened on 1 June 1882 by the Caledonian Railway. It had four platforms whereas the original station had two. On the west side was the goods yard, called Mossend Goods. The west platforms closed in 1903 enabling easy access to Mossend Marshalling Yard. The station closed on 5 November 1962.

Preceding station	Disused railways	Following station
Carnbroe; Line and station closed	Wishaw and Coltness Railway	Carfin; Line and station closed
