= Garnkirk and Glasgow Railway =

UK railway line

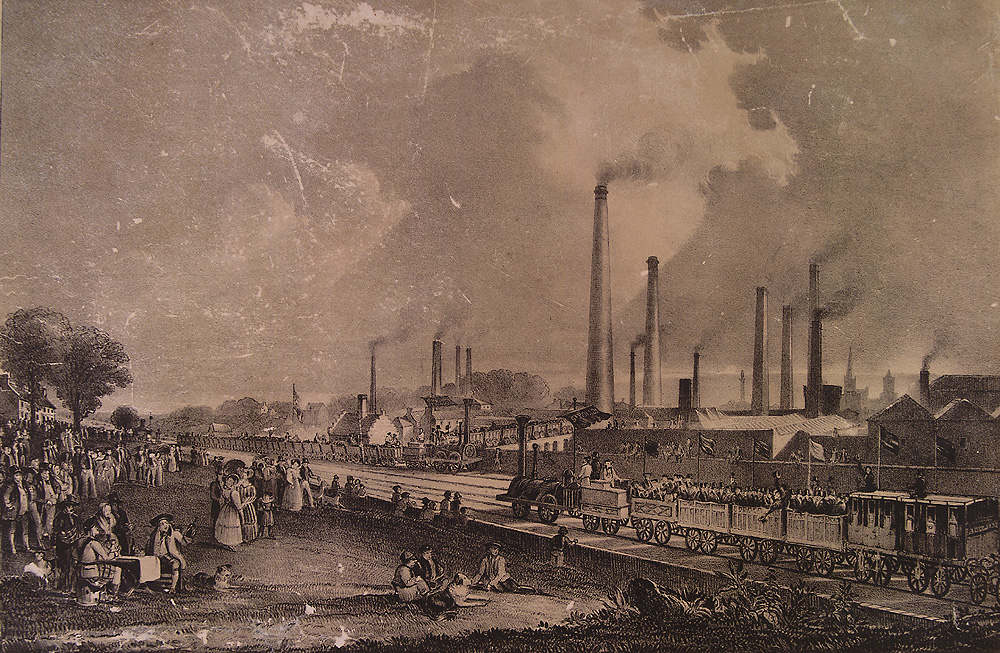
- Picture or drawing of train on the opening of the Garnkirk and Glasgow Railway in 1831, while passing the St Rollox Chemical Works

Overview
- Dates of operation: 1831–1844
- Successor: Caledonian Railway

Technical
- Track gauge: 4 ft 8 1/2 in (1,435 mm)
- Previous gauge: 4 ft 6 in (1,372 mm)

The Garnkirk and Glasgow Railway was an early railway built primarily to carry coal to Glasgow and other markets from the Monkland coalfields, shortening the journey and bypassing the monopolistic charges of the Monkland Canal; passenger traffic also developed early in the line's existence.

It opened officially on 27 September 1831 using horse traction, and had the track gauge of 4 ft 6 in (1,372 mm) that had been adopted by the Monkland and Kirkintilloch Railway, with which it was to connect.

It was dependent on the Monkland and Kirkintilloch Railway for access to the best areas of the coalfields, but eventually it by-passed this constraint by extending its line southwards through Coatbridge, enabling a direct link with another coal railway, the Wishaw and Coltness Railway. Widening its horizons it changed its name to the Glasgow, Garnkirk and Coatbridge Railway.

The track gauge originally chosen was now a limitation and its gauge was altered to the standard of 4 ft 8 1/2 in (1,435 mm). When the Caledonian Railway advanced on Glasgow, the Glasgow, Garnkirk and Coatbridge provided a ready-made access route, and the Caledonian company purchased the Garnkirk line.

Most of its original route remains open today.

== Origins ==
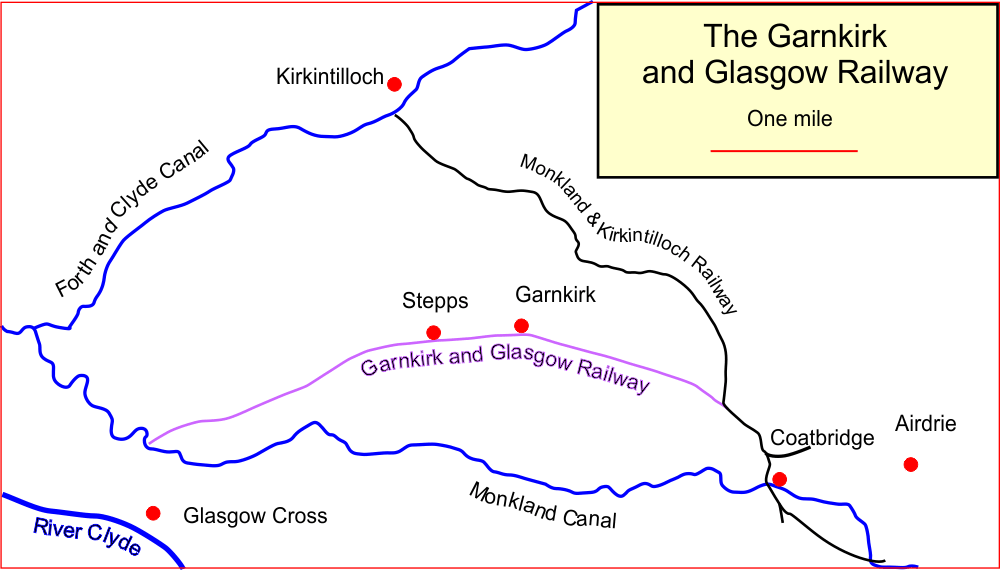
Route map of the Garnkirk and Glasgow Railway

In the eighteenth century, the city of Glasgow experienced increasing demand for coal, both for domestic and industrial purposes; the most convenient source was the Monkland coalfield, south of Airdrie, but the distance of over ten miles incurred considerable expense in the absence of an efficient means of transport. The Monkland Canal was opened in 1791, reducing the price of coal in Glasgow considerably. However a cartel of some of the coal owners attempted to keep prices artificially high, and from 1813 they managed to achieve a near-monopoly of the supply of Monkland coal, with the canal also charging monopolistic prices for carriage.

By 1823 the Monkland and Kirkintilloch Railway (M&KR) was being promoted, connecting the coalfield with the Forth and Clyde Canal at Kirkintilloch. Although this provided a route to Glasgow by-passing the Monkland Canal, "there seems little doubt that the principal intention of the M&KR promoters was the provision of a convenient route for Monkland coal to the Edinburgh market." Accordingly, it was the principal coal consumers in Glasgow who were dominant in proposing a railway to convey coal directly to Glasgow. The chief sponsors included Charles Tennant & Co, who had their St Rollox Chemical Works at Townhead, Glasgow, adjacent to the Monkland Canal.

Garnkirk and Glasgow Railway Act 1826
- Act of Parliament
- Parliament of the United Kingdom
- Long title: An Act for making a Railway from the Monkland and Kirkintilloch Railway, by Garnkirk, to Glasgow.
- Citation: 7 Geo. 4. c. ciii

Dates
- Royal assent: 26 May 1826

Text of statute as originally enacted

The railway was called The Garnkirk and Glasgow Railway, (G&GR) indicating the route and destination of the new railway; although there were extensive fireclay deposits at Garnkirk, it was not an important terminal of the new railway: most of the mineral traffic would originate on the M&KR system. The company was to have authorised capital of £28,497 17s 4d. The new company got its act of Parliament on 26 May 1826, the Garnkirk and Glasgow Railway Act 1826 (7 Geo. 4. c. ciii); the act empowered it to make the necessary connection to the Monkland and Kirkintilloch Railway.

The act stipulated that the company could not issue dividends of more than 10% unless they reduced their tolls to stated amounts. There was a decision to alter the course of the railway, and this involved an additional £11,000 capital.

Garnkirk and Glasgow Railway Act 1827
- Act of Parliament
- Parliament of the United Kingdom
- Long title: An Act for altering and amending the Garnkirk and Glasgow Railway Act.
- Citation: 7 & 8 Geo. 4. c. lxxxviii
- Territorial extent: United Kingdom

Dates
- Royal assent: 14 June 1827
- Commencement: 14 June 1827 (Note: The Acts of Parliament (Commencement) Act 1793.)
Other legislation
Relates to	Forth and Clyde Navigation Act 1806; Forth and Clyde Navigation Act 1814; Forth and Clyde Navigation Act 1820

Text of statute as originally enacted

The junction was to be at Bedlay (near modern Muirhead), and would have followed a more northerly route than that actually built. However the promoters decided it would be advantageous to shorten the extent of usage of the rival M&KR line, and to make the gradients more favourable to loaded traffic. Accordingly, a new act of Parliament, the Garnkirk and Glasgow Railway Act 1827 (7 & 8 Geo. 4. c. lxxxviii), was sought, and obtained on 14 June 1827, authorising the junction to be at Gartsherrie, and the Glasgow terminal to be at the "cut of junction" where the Monkland Canal and the Forth and Clyde Canal met. The amendment act also authorised increased capital of £9,350. Accordingly, the route was from the junction with the M&KR at Gartsherrie, near the Gargill Colliery, running via Gartcloss, Gartcosh, Garnkirk, Robroyston, Milton, Broomfield, Germiston, Rosebank and Pinkston to terminate at the Glasgow depot at Townhead. The Townhead depot was at the point where Keppochhill Road crossed the Forth and Clyde Canal. The M8 motorway and Springburn Road junction system has obliterated the site, but it was approximately at the present-day western end of Charles Street.

== Construction ==
Contracts were swiftly let, and the first sod was cut on 28 August 1827. The engineers were Thomas Grainger and John Miller, who were also engineers to the M&KR.

The railway was planned to have gentle gradients and a good alignment, in contrast to the Monkland and Kirkintilloch line and other short mineral lines, and of the nearly 8 1/4-mile (13.3 km) extent, the first (eastern) 5 1/4 miles (8.4 km) were level and the remainder descended at 1 in 144. It was designed to be a locomotive line from the outset—a far-sighted decision, although it incurred considerable extra expense in heavier track construction.

This required heavy earthworks, with large embankments at Gartcloss, Gartcosh, Provanmill and Germiston, and deep cuttings at Gartcosh, Blackfauld and Provanmill. Moreover, considerable work was needed to form the railway across Robroyston Moss: after levelling, tree branches were placed on the track bed, and on them longitudinal timber beams were laid; cross-beams of Scotch fir were fixed on them, and then longitudinal planks of red pine, 9 by 4.5 inches (230 mm × 110 mm) (broad x thick) were laid on them; finally the rails of 12 pounds per foot (18 kg/m) were laid on the planks. Elsewhere on the line fish bellied rails to Birkinshaw's patent—another far-sighted decision—at 28 pounds per yard (14 kg/m) in 15-foot (4.6 m) lengths were laid on stone blocks each weighing 3 long hundredweight (340 lb; 150 kg).

The line was built to the 4 ft 6 in (1,372 mm) track gauge, which had been adopted by the M&KR; interchange of wagons with that line was essential.

Francis Whishaw, writing in 1839, stated that there were six level crossings on the line.

Garnkirk and Glasgow Railway Act 1830
- Act of Parliament
- Parliament of the United Kingdom
- Long title: An Act for amending certain Acts for making the Glasgow and Garnkirk Railway, and for raising a further sum of Money.
- Citation: 11 Geo. 4 & 1 Will. 4. c. cxxv

Dates
- Royal assent: 17 June 1830

Text of statute as originally enacted

Construction was delayed by exceptionally bad weather, and the company had to obtain parliamentary authority for additional capital, which it obtained in the Garnkirk and Glasgow Railway Act 1830 (11 Geo. 4 & 1 Will. 4. c. cxxv) on 17 June 1830 for a further £21,150.

The first revenue traffic was carried in March 1831, when coal was sent eastwards from Gartcloss Colliery to the M&KR system, but during May 1831 horse-drawn coal trains from Monklands to Glasgow started operating.

== Operation and traffic ==
Now following swiftly on from the opening, a passenger service was started on 1 June 1831, running from the G&GR Townhead terminus and Leaend, on the margin of Airdrie, on the Ballochney Railway, the trains operating intermediately over the M&KR. There were four journeys every day.

Moreover, Buchanan reported that:

Each time, also, the engine starts with a load of coals from the upper part of the line, or with empty waggons returning, a small passenger waggon is attached, not being regulated by any hour, and a considerable number of stragglers find their way in this manner along the line.

At the end of June 1831 the company's first locomotive entered service; it was named St Rollox and was a 2-2-0 of the Planet type, built by Robert Stephenson and Company, and was applied to the passenger service. The M&KR would not allow the locomotive on to their track, and the trains were horse-drawn from Gargill (Gartsherrie) eastwards.

This more modern type of locomotive again demonstrated the G&GR's dynamic thinking. A double line of rails was ready by September 1831, and on 27 September a ceremonial opening of the line took place.

GARNKIRK & GLASGOW RAILWAY LOCOMOTIVES 1831 to 1848
Name	Wheel Arrangement	Foundry	Built	Notes
St Rollox	2-2-0	R Stephenson & Co	1831	Sold 1836 Paisley & Renfrew Railway
George Stephenson	0-4-0	R Stephenson & Co	1831	Withdrawn 1846
Glasgow	0-4-0	Johnston & McNab	1832	Scrapped 1847
Garnkirk	0-4-0	Murdoch & Aitken & Co	1834	Scrapped 1847
Gartgill	0-6-0	Murdoch & Aitken & Co	1833	Withdrawn 1847
Frew	0-4-0	St Rollox Foundry Co	1835	Withdrawn 1848
Jenny	2-2-0	Murdoch & Aitken & Co	1836	Scrapped 1847
Victoria	0-6-0	St Rollox Foundry Co	1840	Sold 1847
St Rollox	0-6-0	St Rollox Foundry Co	1840	Sold 1847
Carfin	0-6-0	St Rollox Foundry Co	1840	Sold 1847
Alchymist	0-4-0	Neilson & Mitchell	1843	Caledonian Railway No 80
Astrologer	0-4-0	Neilson & Mitchell	1843	Caledonian Railway No 81
Magician	0-4-0	Neilson & Mitchell	1843	Caledonian Railway No 82

== Coal railways ==
The railway companies that opened in the Monklands and Glasgow area became known as the coal railways, marking both their primary traffic and their inter-dependency.

The G&GR company was dependent on the Monkland and Kirkintilloch line for originating traffic from the Monklands coalfield, and when the Wishaw and Coltness Railway (W&CR) opened in 1833, its traffic from further south passed over the M&K line too. Although the G&GR had planned for locomotive operation, there was evidently also significant horse-drawn traffic. The M&KR was seeking parliamentary authority to double their line, and the G&GR tried to get a clause giving them running powers to the Wishaw and Coltness line. The G&GR argued that when the M&K line was doubled, traffic for each direction should be allocated to each track; the G&GR argued that the two tracks should be allocated to locomotive use and (their own) horse-drawn trains respectively. There was clearly friction between the two companies, arising from horse-operated G&GR trains delaying M&KR locomotive trains.

However, by 1838 the G&GR was operating locomotives over the G&GR and the W&CR.

== Passenger trains from Edinburgh ==
When the Slamannan Railway opened on 31 August 1840, it proposed a through passenger service between Edinburgh and Glasgow. The Slamannan company's eastern terminal was at Causeway, on the Union Canal, some distance from the capital. On 30 July 1840 the service started, involving a passage on the canal from Port Hopetoun in Edinburgh; traversing the Slamannan company's line, which included a rope-worked incline at Causewayend; the Ballochney Railway, including the double rope-worked inclined place at Commonhead; the Monkland & Kirkintilloch Railway between Kipps at Gartsherrie; and the G&GR itself.

For a while this transit was the prime route between Edinburgh and Glasgow (Townhead), taking about five hours. It lasted until February 1842 when the Edinburgh and Glasgow Railway opened, putting paid to any through traffic over the Slamannan route.

Mixed locomotive and horse operation led to difficulties; in 1840 the company drew up byelaws laying down that passenger trains in both directions should share one track with eastbound (i.e. unloaded) horse trains, and the other dedicated to westbound, loaded, horse trains. Waggons were always to give way to passenger trains and to locomotives, and were not to start on a journey unless certain of reaching a siding before being overtaken. (It is not clear how they could know this in the absence even of primitive telecommunications.)

By the first half of 1845, the company was carrying all the coal traffic on its line, while outside carriers conveyed 19% of "other goods".

In this period, attention was being drawn to the high cost of operation of the line; in 1839 - 1843 gross revenue was £15,337 and working expenditure was 51.3% of that sum.

== The Glasgow, Garnkirk and Coatbridge Railway ==
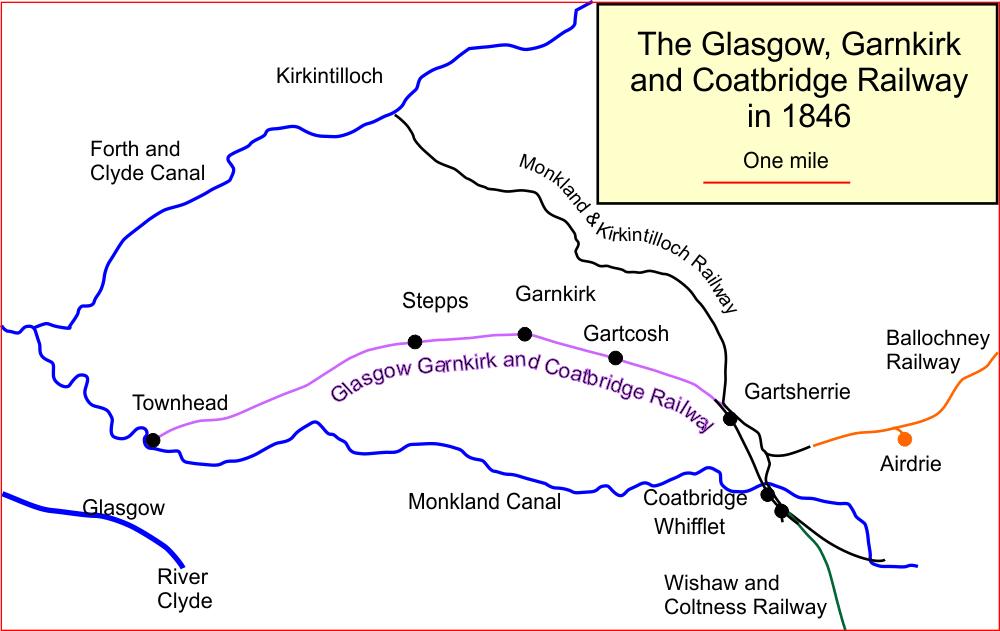
The Glasgow Garnkirk and Coatbridge system in 1846

Friction between the G&GR and the neighbouring M&KR developed. The M&KR passenger station at Coatbridge ("The Howes") was constantly complained of by the G&GR as being a deterrent to passengers. A more fundamental issue was the intensive traffic over the M&KR section, crossing a junction of main roads at Coatbridge. Moreover, the Wishaw and Coltness Railway (W&CR) relied on the M&KR section to convey coal from its line to the G&GR. The M&KR refused to allow locomotives on its line, even though the two other railways used them routinely.

At length the G&GR decided to build its own independent line paralleling, and by-passing, the M&KR, and connecting directly with the W&CR line. When it sought parliamentary authority it changed its name to the more appropriate Glasgow, Garnkirk and Coatbridge Railway (GG&CR). It was formed on 19 July 1844.

Running north-south between Gartsherrie and Whifflet, and to the west of the M&KR line, the new route opened in July 1845. It crossed the Monkland Canal and Bank Street in Coatbridge by a bridge, and it crossed the M&KR Rosehall branch on the level. There was a new Coatbridge station, which much later became Coatbridge Central.

== The Caledonian Railway ==
From 1844 business interests were promoting the idea of a new railway from Carlisle to both Edinburgh and Glasgow. The old coal railways had already found themselves at a disadvantage with their non-standard track gauge of 4 ft 6 in (1,372 mm), which prevented interchange of traffic with the more modern railways that were developing. The Caledonian Railway offered considerable extra traffic, by connecting to the Wishaw and Coltness line at Garriongill, and continuing to Glasgow over it and the GG&CR. As the Caledonian line was to be standard gauge (4 ft 8 1/2 in (1,435 mm)), this was obviously contingent on those railways changing their gauge to suit. In fact all the coal railways decided to change in concert, and did probably on 26 August 1847 and for a few days after. There was a miners' strike at this time, so the cessation of mineral traffic for the work was not as difficult as it might have been.

Caledonian Railway (Glasgow, Garnkirk and Coatbridge Railway Purchase) Act 1846
- Act of Parliament
- Parliament of the United Kingdom
- Long title: An Act to effectuate the Sale of the Glasgow, Garnkirk, and Coatbridge Railway Company of the said Railway to the Caledonian Railway Company; and other Purposes therewith connected.
- Citation: 9 & 10 Vict. c. cccxxix

Dates
- Royal assent: 3 August 1846

The Caledonian Railway pursued its plans to enter Glasgow, and also to reach Stirling and Perth by building from near Gartsherrie to meet the projected Scottish Central Railway at Greenhill. The Caledonian negotiated to acquire both the W&CR and the GG&CR, and in fact it leased the GG&CR from 1 January 1846. On 3 August 1846 the Caledonian Railway (Glasgow, Garnkirk and Coatbridge Railway Purchase) Act 1846 (9 & 10 Vict. c. cccxxix) was obtained for amalgamation, and final amalgamation occurred on 29 June 1865.

The GG&CR company was not dissolved until 2 August 1880.

== Notes ==
=== Sources ===
- Awdry, Christopher (1990). Encyclopaedia of British Railway Companies. Sparkford: Patrick Stephens Ltd. ISBN 1-8526-0049-7. OCLC 19514063. CN 8983.
- Cunnison, J. and Gilfillan, J.B.S., (1958). The Third Statistical Account of Scotland: Glasgow. Glasgow: William Collins Sons & Co. Ltd.
- Jowett, Alan (March 1989). Jowett's Railway Atlas of Great Britain and Ireland: From Pre-Grouping to the Present Day (1st ed.). Sparkford: Patrick Stephens Ltd. ISBN 978-1-85260-086-0. OCLC 22311137.
- Little, M., (1979). Greater Glasgow's Railway Network. In: Scottish Transport, 33, Scottish Tramway Museum Society. ISSN 0048-9808.
- Thomas, John (Introduction) (n.d.) [post-1977 and pre-1982]. Smith, W. A. C. (compiler) (ed.). Rails Around Glasgow. Paisley: Scottish Steam Railtours Group. ISBN 0-9506-9090-2.
- Thomas, John (1971). A Regional History of the Railways of Great Britain. Volume VI Scotland: The Lowlands and the Borders (1st ed.). Newton Abbot, Devon: David & Charles. ISBN 0-7153-5408-6. OCLC 16198685.
- Whishaw, Francis (1969) [1840]. The Railways of Great Britain and Ireland practically described and illustrated (3rd ed.). Newton Abbot: David & Charles. ISBN 0-7153-4786-1.
