= Monkland and Kirkintilloch Railway =

Railway in East Dunbartonshire, Scotland (1826–1982)

Coordinates: 55°55′27.91″N 4°8′29.10″W

Overview
- Dates of operation: 1826–1982
- Successor: North British Railway

Technical
- Track gauge: 4 ft 8 1/2 in (1,435 mm) standard gauge
- Previous gauge: 4 ft 6 in (1,372 mm)

The Monkland and Kirkintilloch Railway (M&KR) was an early mineral railway running from a colliery at Monklands to the Forth and Clyde Canal at Kirkintilloch, Scotland. It was the first railway to use a rail ferry, the first public railway in Scotland, and the first in Scotland to use locomotive power successfully, and it had a great influence on the successful development of the Lanarkshire iron industry. It opened in 1826.

It was built to enable the cheaper transport of coal to market, breaking the monopoly of the Monkland Canal. It connected with the Forth and Clyde Canal at Kirkintilloch, giving onward access not only to Glasgow, but to Edinburgh as well.

The development of good ironstone deposits in the Coatbridge area made the railway successful, and the ironstone pits depended at first on the railway. Horse traction was used at first, but steam locomotive operation was later introduced: the first successful such use in Scotland. Passengers were later carried, and briefly the M&KR formed a section of the principal passenger route between Edinburgh and Glasgow.

In 1848 the company merged with two adjoining railway lines to become the Monkland Railways; which in turn were absorbed by the Edinburgh and Glasgow Railway. A short length of the original route remains in use in the Coatbridge area.

== Formation of the railway ==
In the first decades of the 19th century, the City of Glasgow had a large and increasing requirement for coal, for domestic and industrial use, and after the cessation of coal extraction from local pits, this was chiefly supplied from the Lanarkshire coal field, centred near Airdrie, in Monkland. There was also some extraction of iron ore in the area.

The Monkland Canal had opened in 1794, and provided a considerable stimulus to the coalpits in Monkland, and early iron workings were encouraged also. However, before the era of a proper road network, the canal had a virtual monopoly of transport, and it set its prices accordingly; so successful was its exploitation of the situation that it "for many years yielded a dividend of Cent. per cent ... arising solely on its tolls on coal".

A group of interested businessmen promoted the Monkland and Kirkintilloch Railway to link the coal pits and iron works to the Forth and Clyde Canal at Kirkintilloch. If coal and minerals were transshipped there, they could reach not only Glasgow, escaping the monopoly of the Monkland Canal, but also Edinburgh.

Monkland and Kirkintilloch Railway Act 1824
- Act of Parliament
- Parliament of the United Kingdom
- Long title: An Act for making a Railway from Palace-Craig in the Parish of Old Monkland in the County of Lanark, to the Forth and Clyde Canal near Kirkintilloch in the County of Dumbarton.
- Citation: 5 Geo. 4. c. xlix

Dates
- Royal assent: 17 May 1824

The scheme obtained authority on 17 May 1824 by the Monkland and Kirkintilloch Railway Act 1824 (5 Geo. 4. c. xlix), with share capital of £32,000 and powers to raise a further £10,000 by additional shares or by borrowing. Construction started by contract the following month.

The engineer for the scheme was Thomas Grainger, in his first large undertaking; he had previously been chiefly engaged in road schemes. When he became engaged on the construction of the railway, he took as his assistant John Miller, and a year later the two men formed a partnership, Grainger & Miller, which was to be heavily involved in Scottish railway schemes.

It was built to the track gauge of 4 ft 6 in (1,372 mm), and as other 'coal railways' opened up in the area in connection with the line, this track gauge became established for their use. It is not known why Grainger chose this gauge. He must have been aware of the huge success of the Stockton and Darlington Railway, built to a gauge of 4 ft 8½ in. The convention for specifying gauge had not settled down at this early date; as late as 1845 Captain Coddington of the Railway Inspectorate was describing another railway and wrote: "Gauge of rails 4 ft 8½ in from centre of rail to centre of rail, and 4 feet 6 inches from inside to inside of rail." and it is not impossible that Grainger intended to imitate the Stockton line but mistook the parameter. Whatever the reason, he inadvertently caused huge disadvantage to the M&KR and several other coal railways in Central Scotland.

== Opening ==
The line is quoted to have opened in October 1826, but the section north of Gartsherrie at least must have opened during May 1826, although the earliest "opening" may have been for trial runs only. On 1 June 1826 a coal merchant, James Shillinglaw advertised coal from Gartsherrie for sale in Edinburgh:

"The Gartshearie Coal (from the Monkland Coal-Field) is now introduced for the first time in Edinburgh, in consequence of the opening of the Kirkintilloch Railway."

At first the railway did not own wagons or horses to pull them, and independent hauliers operated over the line, paying the company a toll for the privilege. It was only from 1835 that the company started to acquire its own fleet of wagons.

The M&KR operated successfully from its opening: revenue was £704 in 1826, £2,020 in 1827, and £2,837 in 1828. The price of coal in Glasgow fell markedly, as much due to the weakening of the cartel previously in force. However the bulk of coal arrived in Glasgow by the canal—about 89% in 1830.

== Route ==
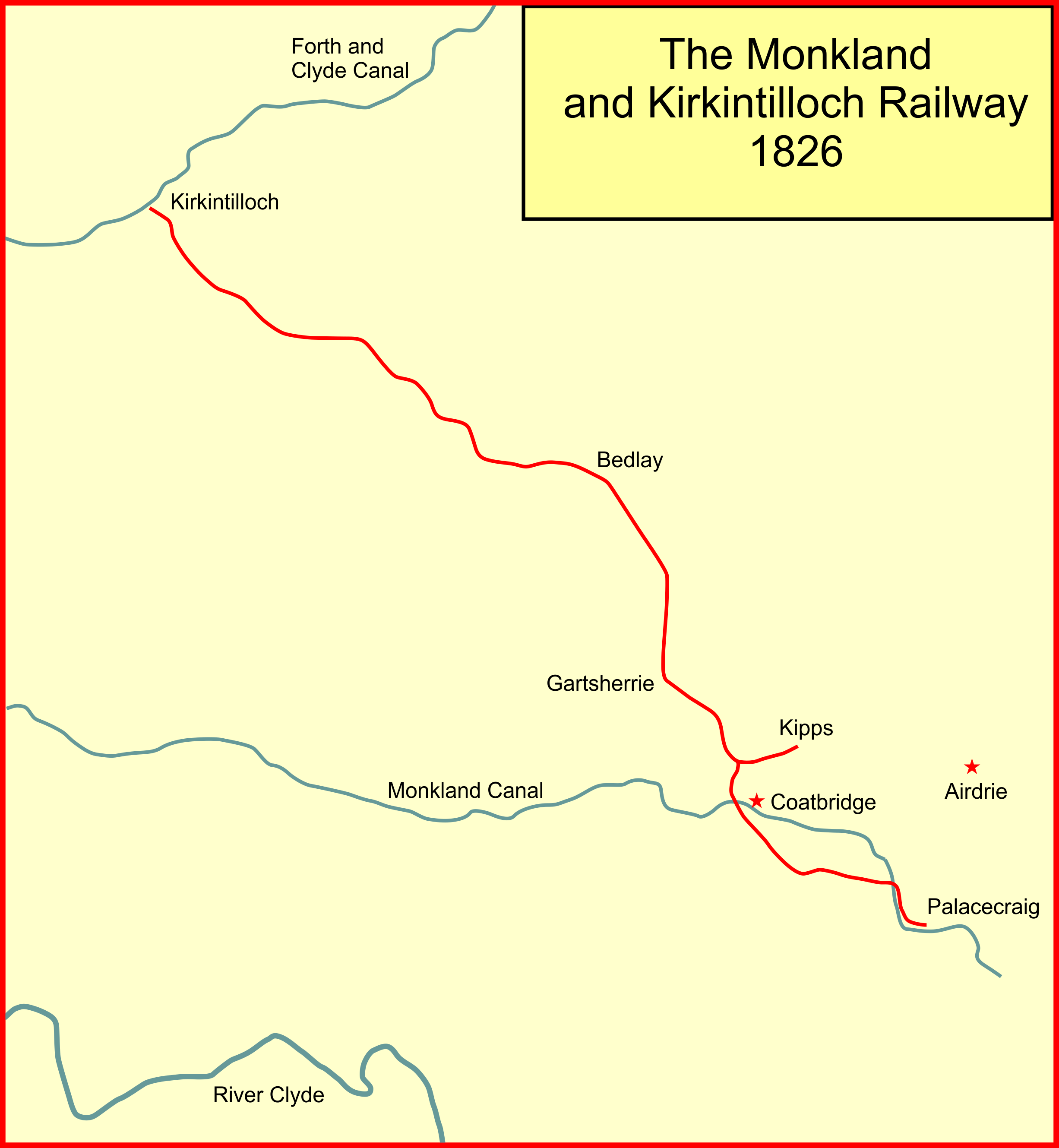
Map of route with contemporary canals and modern railways

George Buchanan, writing in 1832, described the route:

The railway commences at Palacecraig and Cairnhill Collieries about a mile south-west of Airdrie, and nine or ten miles east of Glasgow in a straight line. From this point it runs about a mile westwards, passing close to the north of the [William Dixon's] Calder Iron Works; it then turns to the north-west, and about half a mile farther on, crosses the Edinburgh and Glasgow road by Airdrie, at the same point this road crosses the Monkland Canal by the Coat Bridge. (Note: At this time the town of Coatbridge did not exist, and the reference is simply to the wooden bridge that carried the Edinburgh to Glasgow Road over the Monkland Canal, adjacent to the Gartsherrie Burn) This is nine miles from the Cross at Glasgow, and two miles west of Airdrie. From this point the line continues nearly due north for a quarter of a mile, and here a small branch goes off eastwards about three-fourths of a mile, to the Colliery of Kipps [near Archibald Frew's Kippsbyre Colliery]. The line then advances northwards for about a mile, passing to the east of Gartsherrie Coal and Iron Works, and on to Gargill Colliery, where it turns nearly north for two miles; and turning again to the north-westwards with several turns till it reaches the canal opposite Kirkintilloch.

The whole length from Cairnhill Bridge to the Forth and Clyde Canal is ten miles and the fall about 127 feet. In some parts it is quite level, and in others runs with a gentle but variable declination. ... It was originally laid with a single line of rails and passing places. Ground was taken, however, to lay a double line of way and this has since been gradually carrying into effect. The expense of the original line was about L. 3700 (i.e. £3,700) a mile.

Priestley said that the fall from Palacecraig to the canal was 133 feet 11 inches (40.82 m), and from Kipps Colliery to the canal of 161 feet 3 inches (49.15 m). Gradients were moderate, with the steepest on the main line being 1 in 120 (8.3 ‰) to the east of Bedlay, and 1 in 80 (12.5 ‰) on the Kipps branch.

The line crossed Main Street and Bank Street on the level at what is now the roundabout for Sunnyside Street, a little to the east of the later high level line, now which crosses Bank Street on a bridge. The canal passes under the road at this point. The level crossing at this important road junction was eliminated when the high level lattice girder bridge was built in 1872.

Grainger had been instructed "to fit the road for locomotive engines", although the railway passed under the Cumbernauld Road near Bedlay in a low tunnel, with only 9 feet (2.74 m) headroom.

== Birkinshaw rails ==
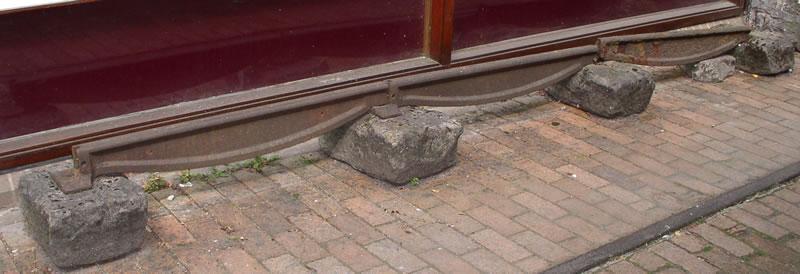
Fish-belly rails used on the Cromford and High Peak line

The M&KR used stone block sleepers with Birkinshaw's patent malleable iron rails. At this early date the technology of rail configuration had not matured, but John Birkinshaw had secured a patent in 1820 for a T-section fish-bellied edge rail of malleable iron. His patent specified that they should be formed by passing through rollers—as they were fish-bellied, presumably only the head was shaped in the rollers. Cast iron, as used until then, is brittle and ill-suited to heavy railway use; malleable iron is heat treated after casting and is able to withstand shocks. (Note: Hammering, from Latin malleus, a hammer; note that malleable iron is not wrought iron, which is made by a different process) The Stockton and Darlington Railway was the first public railway to adopt Birkinshaw's rail; the Monkland and Kirkintilloch Railway was either the second or the third public (Note: The rails may have been laid in small quantities on some private mineral lines) railway.

== Other railways, friendly and competing ==
=== Ballochney Railway ===
As the first railway in a rapidly developing industrial area, the M&KR soon found that industry was springing up just beyond its reach. While some short branches and extensions were built (see below), other railways took the challenge and connected the new works.

First to follow the M&KR was the Ballochney Railway, opened in 1828, and running eastwards from the end of the Kipps branch to "that part of the Monkland Coal Field to the North and East of Airdrie". The Ballochney was dependent on the M&KR for onwards conveyance of the minerals, and relations were friendly.

=== Garnkirk and Glasgow Railway ===
The success of mineral railways throughout Great Britain was apparent, and before the M&KR was opened, businessmen in Glasgow were proposing a direct railway: after all, transport over the M&KR involved transshipment to canal at Kirkintilloch, and was by no means direct. Support for the idea quickly gained strength, and the direct line, to be called the Garnkirk and Glasgow Railway (G&GR) was authorised by the Garnkirk and Glasgow Railway Act 1826 (7 Geo. 4. c. ciii) in May 1826. At first it was to diverge from the M&KR near Bedlay and run more or less directly to Townhead, but its proprietors had second thoughts and changed the point of junction to Gartsherrie Bridge.

The G&GR opened in 1831, and at first relations with the M&KR were friendly; the G&GR was dependent on its mineral traffic originating on the M&KR. From the M&KR point of view, they had a wharf on the deep water Forth and Clyde Canal, reached by seagoing vessels, whereas the G&GR was to terminate on the shallow "cut of junction" (the connection at Townhead between the Monkland Canal and the Forth and Clyde Canal).

As technology and trade developed this relationship changed; the M&KR was a feeder railway, dependent on canals, and the G&GR, for onward conveyance; its locomotives were technically less advanced; and the G&GR seemed to flirt with extensions and alliances that threatened to cut the M&KR out. Gradually the G&GR became more of a competitor and less of an ally.

=== Slamannan Railway ===
In 1840 the Slamannan Railway opened between a point on the Ballochney Railway at Arbuckle and a wharf on the Union Canal at Causewayend. While the promoters suggested that traffic would arise from coal pits actually on their line of route, the obvious objective was to convey Monklands coal to Edinburgh direct, by-passing the Forth and Clyde Canal and much of the transit over the M&KR. However a long route over unpopulated terrain, ending in a rope-worked incline and a transshipment to the canal, seriously limited its potential.

The opening of the Slamannan line did give rise to a faster passenger journey from Edinburgh to Glasgow, by canal from Edinburgh to Causewayend, and then successively by the Slamannan, Ballochney, Monkland and Kirkintilloch and Garnkirk & Glasgow Railways; the journey took four hours.

Passing through remote moorland with few mineral deposits actually being worked the Slamannan line was never a success, and the opening of the better engineered Edinburgh and Glasgow Railway in 1842 dealt it a near-fatal blow.

== Industrial development ==
Technical development in iron production had a massive influence in the Coatbridge area. Iron ores had been extracted in the area since the beginning of the century, but David Mushet discovered blackband ironstone which had a much richer iron content coupled with carboniferous material and in 1828 James Beaumont Neilson invented the hot blast process of iron smelting. In the third and fourth decades of the nineteenth century the iron industry expanded hugely in the Coatbridge area. There were 17 blast furnaces in 1826 and 53 in 1843. The hot blast process consumed large quantities of local coal; the processes previously in use had required coke, for the production of which the local coals were unsuitable. This encouraged further coal production, as well as ironstone extraction.

The smelting process also required limestone, conveyed at first by horse and cart from the Cumbernauld area; and fireclay, available in the Gartsherrie and Garnkirk areas, for manufacturing refractory bricks for lining the kilns and withstanding high temperatures.

The M&KR found itself straddling the centre of the iron smelting industry, but aligned and engineered for carrying coal to Kirkintilloch, and not connected to the developing ironstone and coal pits. This generated huge potential, but also considerable challenges as the needs of the dominant industries developed.

Other local mineral railways were constructed to access pits and works, and as the M&KR was located at the centre of the iron industry, they worked in collaboration with it, and adopted the same 4 ft 6 in (1,372 mm) track gauge. As inter-city railways developed elsewhere, they adopted what had become the standard gauge of 4 ft 8 1/2 in (1,435 mm), and they quickly became the dominant transport medium. The Edinburgh and Glasgow Railway opened in 1842. The local lines in Monkland could not transfer their wagons to those other lines and, operating with horses and technically primitive locomotives, on stone block sleepered track, they found themselves at an enormous disadvantage.

== Growth and development ==
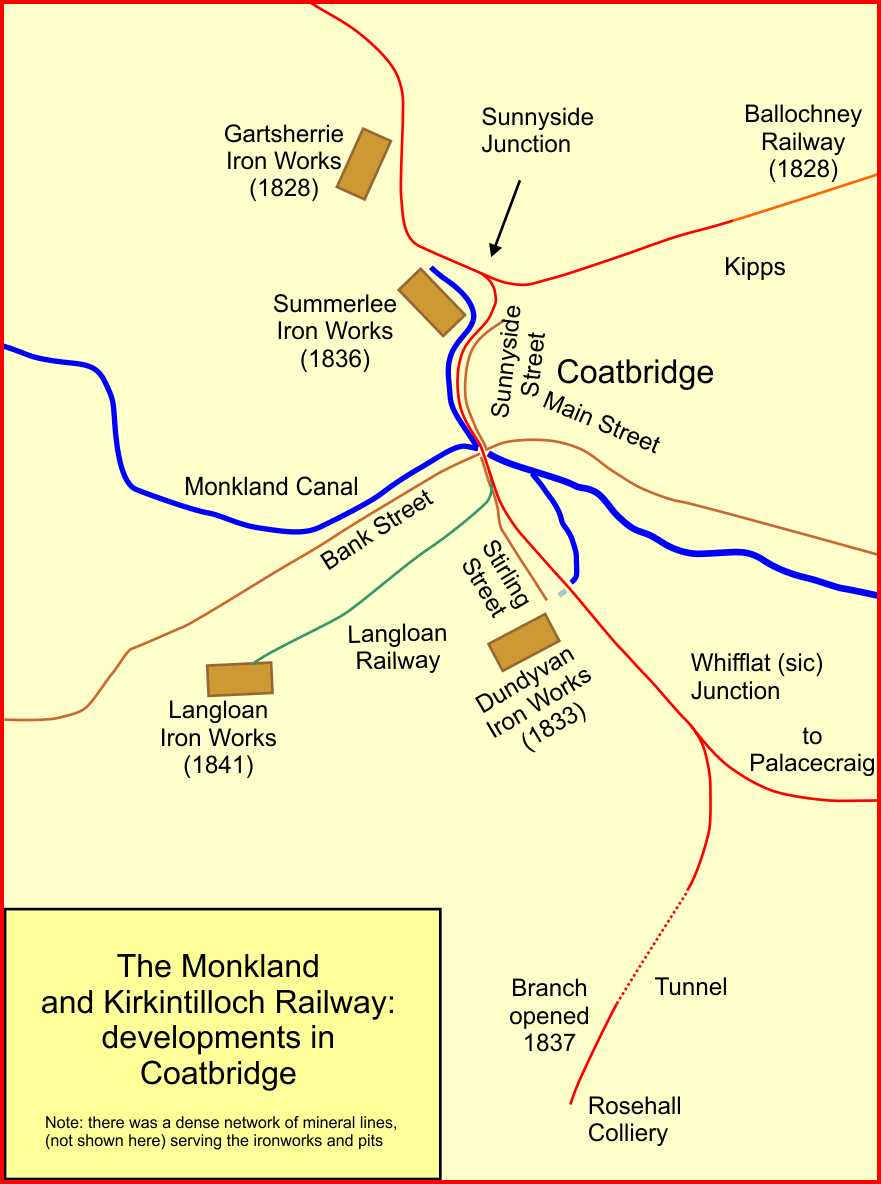
Detail of the M&KR line in Coatbridge

It soon became clear to the promoters of the railway that much work had to be done on the line after opening, due to the heavy use of the line. In February 1830 it was reported that 5,320 yards (4,865 m) of track had been doubled, and that a further 2,000 yards (1,829 m) would be doubled during the subsequent Spring, and the decision was taken to raise the additional £10,000 of share capital, authorised in the Monkland and Kirkintilloch Railway Act 1824. Thomas and Paterson imply that this work was "making the line fit to receive" locomotives. The first locomotive ran from 1831 (see below).

Monkland and Kirkintilloch Railway Act 1833
- Act of Parliament
- Parliament of the United Kingdom
- Long title: An Act for making Two Branch Railways from the Monkland and Kirkintilloch Railway; and for altering, amending, and enlarging the Powers of an Act of the Fifth Year of His late Majesty for making the said Railway.
- Citation: 3 & 4 Will. 4. c. cxiv

Dates
- Royal assent: 24 July 1833

Other legislation
- Amends: Monkland and Kirkintilloch Railway Act 1824

Text of statute as originally enacted

In 1833 the M&KR was seeking parliamentary authority for two new branches, and additional capital, the additional capital from 1830 having been used up. Operating methods were revealed when Charles Tennant used the hearing to press for an altered method of working. The M&KR was operating between The Howes (Coatbridge) and Gargill with locomotives; the G&GR was permitting hauliers to operate with horse traction, continuing on to the M&KR. The M&KR had been operating this section as two single lines, one for steam traction and one for horses; the M&KR said that the drivers of horses had been "taking off their horses [i.e. coasting downhill] and allowing their waggons to come in contact and collision with the steam carriages". Tennent demanded conversion to ordinary double track working, and there was much manoeuvring in the parliamentary stages. Finally the M&KR got its way, retaining segregation of horse and locomotive haulage, (Note: This was described as following the regulations used on the Stockton and Darlington Railway as long as both lines used mixed haulage. The S&DR segregated haulage at the time.) and the M&KR got its act of Parliament, the Monkland and Kirkintilloch Railway Act 1833 (3 & 4 Will. 4. c. cxiv), on 24 July 1833. The additional capital authorised was £20,000 and this was obtained as a bank loan.

In 1834 another connection was made at Whifflet, when the Wishaw and Coltness Railway made a junction there, bringing pits at Coltness into the M&KR network.

In 1834-5 a basin was constructed by the Forth and Clyde Canal at Kirkintilloch on M&KR land; originally the transshipment point had been a simple canalside wharf. The new basin was opened on 28 February 1835.

In 1835 the Forth and Clyde Canal acquired a 14-ton iron boat equipped with rails and turntables to carry railway wagons. The plan was to load wagons from the M&KR for onward conveyance to any point on the canal; as well as factory sidings this apparently included transfer to seagoing vessels at Grangemouth, and possibly Bowling. At small locations, individual wagons were probably manoeuvred onto hard standing, not necessarily to siding tracks, and the arrangement avoided two transshipments of the material carried. In December 1835 the M&KR expended £81 for new wagons and for cutting rails, i.e. making the approach to the loading point at Kirkintilloch. In 1836 the "coal waggon boat" earned £540.

A branch was opened in 1837 from Whifflat Junction (the present spelling is Whifflet) to Rosehall, passing through a short tunnel. There was a colliery there, and several tramways were built to connect pits in the area to the M&KR. The line was leased for 30 years from Whit Sunday 1838 to Addie and Millar [or Miller] and worked by them.

Monkland and Kirkintilloch Railway Act 1839
- Act of Parliament
- Parliament of the United Kingdom
- Long title: An Act to enable the Monkland and Kirkintilloch Railway Company to raise a further Sum of Money; and to amend the Acts relating to the said Undertaking.
- Citation: 2 & 3 Vict. c. lxx

Dates
- Royal assent: 4 July 1839

Text of statute as originally enacted

Monkland and Kirkintilloch Railway Act 1843
- Act of Parliament
- Parliament of the United Kingdom
- Long title: An Act to make, complete, maintain, and incorporate with the Monkland and Kirkintilloch Railway Two improved or additional Lines of Railway; and to alter, amend, enlarge, and repeal the Acts relating to the said Undertaking.
- Citation: 6 & 7 Vict. c. lxxix

Dates
- Royal assent: 28 July 1843

Text of statute as originally enacted

In 1839 the company secured authority in the Monkland and Kirkintilloch Railway Act 1839 (2 & 3 Vict. c. lxx) for a substantial increase in its capital, to £124,000, "for the purpose of re-laying the line with heavy rails, and otherwise providing for the augmented traffic". In July 1843 further lines were authorised by the Monkland and Kirkintilloch Railway Act 1843 (6 & 7 Vict. c. lxxix), with capital further increased to £210,000.

In 1842 the M&KR responded to the continuing growth in traffic by acquiring five new locomotives and tenders and 232 new wagons.

In 1846 the alignment around Sunnyside Junction at Coatbridge was altered. Gartsherrie Iron Works had been contained between the Monkland Canal and the railway, and the line was shifted eastwards, close to Sunnyside Street, to enable the ironworks to be expanded.

== Locomotives ==
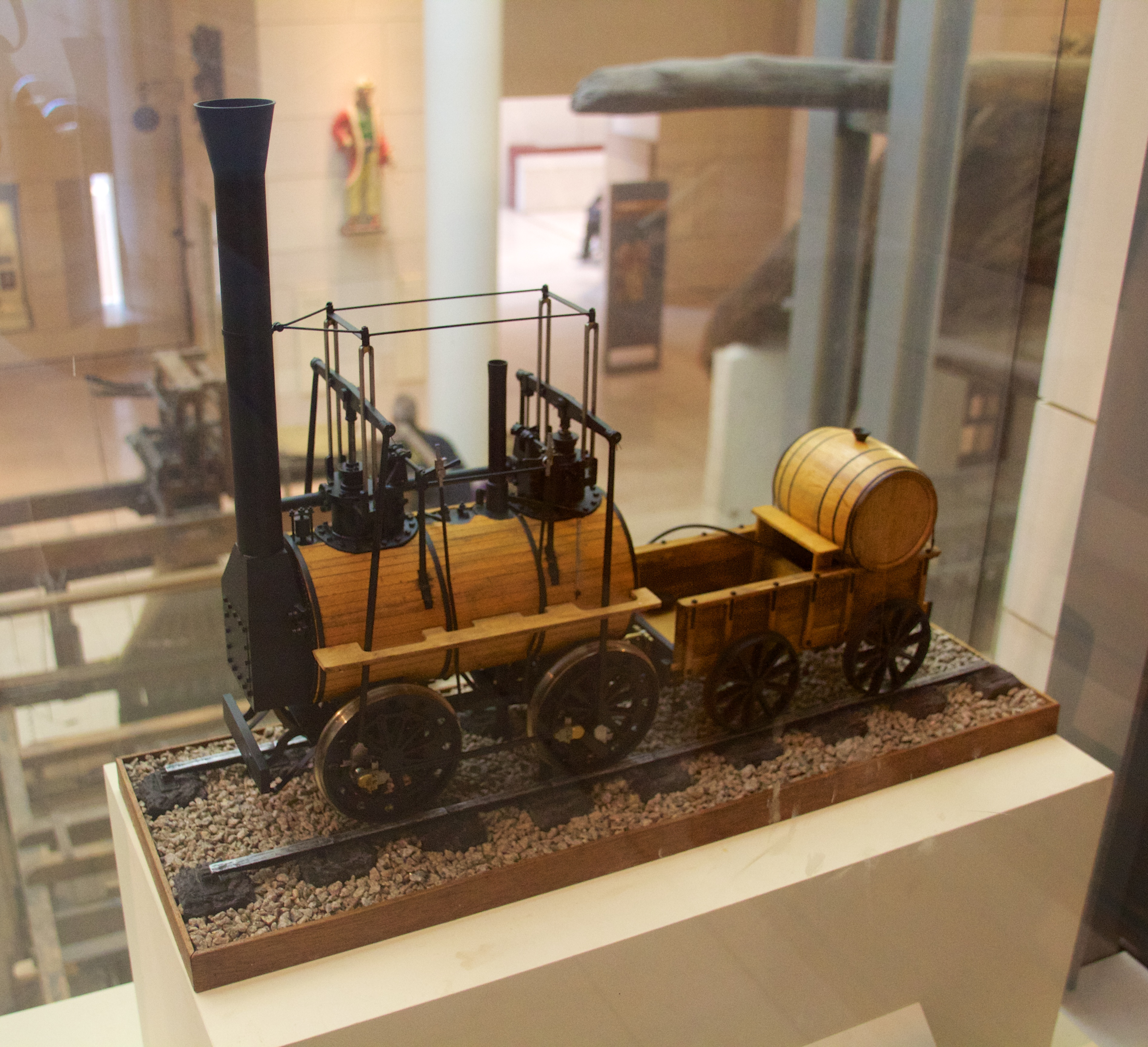
Model of Locomotive no. 1

When the line opened, the motive power was horses, owned by independent hauliers. However the technical developments achieved on the Liverpool and Manchester Railway were noted, and it had been announced that the Garnkirk and Glasgow Railway would use locomotive power. The M&KR company decided to purchase a locomotive; it was designed by George Dodds, the company's own superintendent, and it was constructed by Murdoch, Aitken and Company of Glasgow. Locomotive no. 1 (as it was designated) was delivered on 10 May 1831:

It was taken from the workshop, Hill Street, on Tuesday morning, and being started on the railway below Chryston, it passed several miles along the railway, sometimes going at the rate of fifteen miles per hour (24 km/h), although the company's engines are not required to move, when loaded, at a greater speed than 4 miles per hour (6.4 km/h) an hour.

The locomotive was the first to operate successfully on a commercial basis in Scotland. The M&KR expended £5,925 on strengthening the track for locomotive operation.

The same makers delivered No. 2 on 10 September 1831. These locomotives were of the "Killingworth" type, considered even at this date rather old-fashioned: Dodds had a conservative outlook and had specified this type in preference to the technically progressive English designs of Robert Stephenson. They had two vertical cylinders, and the pistons had piston rings; the boiler was 9 feet (2,743 mm) long by 4 1/2 feet (1,372 mm) diameter, with 62 copper tubes 1 1/2 inches (38 mm) diameter; working pressure was 50 lb/sq in (340 kPa). The wheels were 4 feet (1,219 mm) in diameter. The locomotives were reported to have been very reliable.

When the second locomotive was acquired, the two units operated on either side of Bedlay tunnel which had inadequate clearance; horses were used through the tunnel. In January 1832 through working was started, the line having been doubled, and the tunnel opened out. The location in question is at Bedlay, on a sharp curve immediately south of the Stirling Road, now the A80.

A key factor in the ability to run locomotives at this early date was the use of Birkinshaw patent 'malleable' wrought iron rails, rolled by machine to 15-foot (4.57 m) lengths. These were strong enough to bear the weight of locomotives, unlike the plateways (such as the Kilmarnock and Troon Railway, where the first, unsuccessful attempt to operate locomotives in Scotland took place) or ordinary cast iron rails, which were brittle and prone to fracture under heavy unsprung loads.

In 1837 the company built a workshop for the locomotive purposes at Kipps. Locomotives Nos. 3 and 4 were made by the company itself in 1834 and 1838 respectively. Locomotives named Zephyr, Atlas and Orion were operating in the 1840s.

== Passengers ==
=== Early days ===
A trial of a railway coach took place on 8 July 1828; it was reported in The Scotsman newspaper:

Railway Coach. The first railway coach constructed in Scotland for the conveyance of passengers, made a trial journey in the neighbourhood of Airdrie on Tuesday. It is dragged by one horse, and is to ply on the Kirkintilloch Railway, in carrying passengers to boats on the canal. It is meant to carry 24 passengers, but started in high style with no less than forty, within and without.

Tomlinson infers that a regular passenger service started on that day, and later authors have followed him, but it is not certain that the trial immediately led to a regular run. If and when it did, it must have been from Leaend (on the Ballochney Railway) to Kirkintilloch. In any case, it seems to have been very short-lived. (Note: Butt indicates an opening to passengers on 1 October 1826, but this must be wrong; R V J Butt, The Directory of Railway Stations, Patrick Stephens Limited, Sparkford, 1995, ISBN 1 85260 508 1)

When the Garnkirk and Glasgow Railway opened its line, it operated a service between Leaend and its Townhead terminus in Glasgow, running over part of the Ballochney Railway and the M&KRR Kipps branch, and calling at The Howes in Coatbridge. (Note: It does not seem possible to determine the exact location of The Howes on contemporary maps; at this early date Coatbridge had not developed as a town, and the most likely location is close to the bridge where the Edinburgh to Glasgow road crossed the Monkland Canal. It may be the same location as "South End" referred to in M&KR accounts in 1840.) There were four trains each way daily. As the M&KR operated like a toll road at this time, there was nothing surprising about another business, or in this case another railway company, operating passenger trains over the M&KR line.

At first, from 1 June 1831 this was a horse-drawn service, but a few weeks later the G&GR put a locomotive, called St Rollox on, running as far as Gartsherrie. The M&KR would not allow the locomotive over their line, so horse traction took over from there to Leaend. This service continued until 1843. Bradshaw's Guide shows, in a section headed Garnkirk and Glasgow Railway, passenger trains from Glasgow to Airdrie, &c, at 7½ and 10½ a.m., 1½ and 4½ p.m. Airdrie to Glasgow, &c, 8¾ and 11¾ a.m., 2¾ and 5¾ p.m. Fares, Glasgow and Airdrie 1s. 0d.-- 6d.

In June 1831 there was a horse-drawn service from Calder Iron Works (on the M&KR) to Gartsherrie, connecting there with the Leaend to Glasgow service, and in the summer of 1832 the G&GR advertised a service from Cairnhill Bridge (near the Calder Iron Works) to Glasgow, and also from "Clarkston": the Clarkston Wester Moffat location on the Ballochney Railway, via Kipps:

A Railway Carriage starts from Clarkston and Cairnhill Bridge every Wednesday at a quarter to 8 o'clock A.M. and returns with the evening train from the Railway Depot.

Another advertisement dated 15 October 1832 announced that the Clarkston and Cairnhill carriages were "now discontinued".

=== M&KR passenger services and stations ===
Summarising passenger stations during M&KR days is difficult, and many sources are contradictory. In the earliest days horse drawn trains probably stopped wherever someone wanted to board or alight, without formal station premises.

On 1 June 1831 a passenger service was run from Airdrie Leaend to the Howes (in Coatbridge) and on to Gargill. This was later extended to Glasgow Townhead over the Garnkirk and Glasgow Railway, operated in collaboration with that line. There was a short lived connecting service about this time from Calder Iron Works to Gartsherrie. In the summer of 1832 weekly services were advertised from Cairnhill Bridge and Clarkston to connect with the Airdire to Glasgow trains.

From late 1839 there was service from Leaend to the Howes, Chryston and Kirkintilloch Basin, but this probably ceased in 1840 or soon after.

There was a passenger service from Airdrie Hallcraig Street to Kirkintilloch (the exchange station on the E&GR) from 26 December 1844. There was a connecting service from Kirkintilloch to Kirkintilloch Basin until 23 March 1846. The main passenger service was suspended on 26 July 1847 while the track gauge was altered. On 28 July 1847 the service resumed, now running through to Glasgow Queen Street. On 1 December 1847 the service was diverted to Glasgow over the Garnkirk line from Gartsherrie, but on 10 December 1849 it was reverted to Queen Street. A connecting service was run southwards to Cairnhill Bridge, but this was shortened back to terminate at Whifflat (now called Whifflet) on 1 December 1850. The whole passenger service was suspended on 10 December 1851. A passenger service was reinstated from Glasgow Buchanan Street to Airdrie Hallcraig Street in August 1852.

Taking the stations from north to south, they were as follows.

- Kirkintilloch Basin, open from 1828 at the northern terminus by the canal; closed as a passenger station by 23 March 1846; there was a nearby North British Railway station, opened in 1848, and which continued until 1964;
- Woodley; the Edinburgh and Glasgow Railway had a station called Kirkintilloch, by the modern Easter Garngaber Road; the M&KR opened Woodley station a little to the north on its line in 1844; connecting passengers would have had a 100 yards walk; but in the same year the M&KR constructed a spur to exchange sidings alongside the E&GR at Garngaber and there was passenger exchange there also; (the M&KR and the E&GR had different track gauges at this date); the station was also referred to as Kirkintilloch and also Kirkintilloch Junction; it closed on 26 July 1847;
- Bridgend, at Gartferry Road, opened about 1839 and closed 10 December 1851;
- Bedlay, opened 1849 (i.e. after the end of the M&KR's independent existence) and closed again the same year;
- Garnqueen, probably at Main Street, opened 10 December 1849; closed on 10 December 1851;
- Gartsherrie, at the junction with the G&GR, also known as Gargill; opened 1 June 1831; and closed 10 December 1851; adjacent Caledonian station continued 1940;
- The Howes: probably located at the site of Sunnyside Junction; it opened in 1831 and closed in 1851; also known as South End;
- Coatbridge: opened 10 December 1849; closed 10 December 1851, on the M&KR line alongside the present-day Coatbridge Central station (which is on the parallel GG&CR line); when the M&KR main line was rebuilt at a higher level in North British Railway days (to cross over Bank Street and eliminate the level crossing), a station at the same location was opened in 1871 on the new high level line;
- Whifflat; (nowadays spelt Whifflet); opened 10 December 1849; closed 10 December 1851; the NBR later (1871) opened a station at this location);
- Calder Iron Works; opened June 1831; soon closed;
- Cairnhill Bridge; opened summer 1832; closed by mid October 1832; reopened by Monklands Railway 10 December 1849; closed 1 January 1850.

The location of the early Coatbridge "Howes" station is especially difficult to determine, and it is not shown on any available mapping; when the M&KR opened, Coatbridge was not yet an established community. At times it was called "The Howes", or just "Howes". Cobb places it at Kipps, but this must be wrong. Martin says that there was a stationary engine in 1836 for the accommodation of the traffic coming from the Wishaw Railway, and quotes accounts for the purchase of winding apparatus and ropes. This must have been to rope-haul trains coming from the south up to what became Sunnyside Junction, from the level crossing at Bank Street. There is a "Howes Basin" immediately south-west of the Sunnyside Junction location on the 1864 Ordnance Survey Map. As trains to Leaend stopped at The Howes, it must have been at the junction where the M&KR main line and the Kipps branch diverged.

=== Later developments ===
The opening of the Slamannan Railway in 1840 gave rise to a brief inter-city passenger traffic between Edinburgh and Glasgow, by the Union Canal to Causewayend, thence by the Slamannan line to Arbuckle, and from there by the Ballochney Railway to Kipps, the M&KR to Gartsherrie and the Garnkirk and Glasgow Railway to Townhead. The journey time was four hours or more. The Union Canal basin was not in the centre of Edinburgh, and there were three rope-worked inclines on the route. The stage coach journey time was similar. At first a success, the passenger traffic soon waned, and the opening of the Edinburgh and Glasgow Railway in 1842 put an end to it. None of the stations is referred to in the 1843 Bradshaw or the 1850 Bradshaw

There does not seem to have been much attempt at passenger business in later years, nor on the Kirkintilloch main line. However, on and from 26 December 1844, four trains ran each way daily from the Hallcraig Street station at Airdrie (newly opened on the Ballochney line) to an exchange station at the point of intersection with the Edinburgh and Glasgow Railway, somewhat to the east of the present Lenzie station. This used a new spur to an exchange station; the two railways had different track gauges at this time. The Ballochney company purchased seven second-hand coaches from the Midland Railway for the service. Also in December 1844, a horse-drawn passenger conveyance ran from Kirkintilloch to the Bothlin Viaduct, at the point of intersection, (i.e. over the northern extremity of the M&KR) for connectional purposes, but this seems to have been short-lived.

The M&KR altered its track gauge to standard on 26 and 27 July 1847, and on the following day the Airdrie service was able to run through to Glasgow (Queen Street) via Bishopbriggs; the journey now took 45 minutes. There must have been a lower scale of fares over the E&GR portion (presumably proportionate to fares charged over the G&GR to Glasgow, and undercutting the E&GR's own fares); in November the E&GR gave notice that it would charge the full rate for its portion of the journey. This meant that the fares were now equal to much longer journeys on the M&KR itself, so the M&KR transferred the train service back to the G&GR route from 1 December 1847. However they returned to the Bishopbriggs route from 10 December 1849. It ran until 10 December 1851, from when it was discontinued.

== Losing the competitive race ==
At the time the Monkland and Kirkintilloch line was being built, there was a huge acceleration in the rate of technological change, and the pioneer lines—the coal railways—found themselves left behind by more advanced railways; the Edinburgh and Glasgow Railway (E&GR) opened its line, engineered for fast locomotive hauled trains, in 1842.

The Monkland and Kirkintilloch line found itself left behind; it had a track gauge that prevented through working with the developing networks; to convey minerals to Glasgow, it relied on either transshipment to a canal or transfer to another line (the G&GR); to get to Edinburgh was even worse: access was over the Ballochney Railway, with two rope-worked inclined planes, and then the Slamannan line, with another rope-worked inclined plane, and transshipment at Causewayend to the Union Canal.

This competitive disadvantage was equally keenly felt by the other coal railways with which the M&KR collaborated—the Ballochney and Slamannan companies. They decided that their interests lay in collaboration, and they formed a joint working arrangement from 29 March 1845. In 1844 the M&KR had built a short spur to transshipment sidings with the E&GR at Garngaber, a little east of the present-day Lenzie station. The inconvenience of the transshipment emphasised the fact that their now non-standard track gauge prevented easy transfer of traffic to the developing railway network.

Working together, they decided to change the track gauge to standard gauge; they got parliamentary authority, and effected the change together on 26 July and 27 July 1847.

The Garnkirk and Glasgow had originally been one of the "coal railways" but its management was more progressive and at first a close ally, it gradually became a competitor. It changed its gauge to standard a few weeks after the M&KR, and it opened its new line by-passing the M&KR in 1845, becoming the Glasgow, Garnkirk and Coatbridge Railway (GG&CR), and allying itself more closely with the Wishaw and Coltness Railway (W&CR) to the south. At this time, promoters were forwarding the idea of a railway from Carlisle, connecting with the developing English network, and they needed a route from the Southern Uplands into Glasgow. This was neatly provided by the W&CR and the GG&CR, who now transformed from coal railways to elements of an intercity main line.

The new Caledonian Railway opened its trunk line from Carlisle to Glasgow (over the Garnkirk line) in 1848, emphasising the isolation of the M&KR. At the same time the Caledonian opened a route to Greenhill, to connect with the Scottish Central Railway there. The Caledonian used a short section of the Monkland and Kirkintilloch route, between Gartsherrie and Garnqueen South Junction, to get access to its onward route. In later decades the traffic from Motherwell to Perth adopted this route, and in the twentieth century, Caledonian express passenger trains used what had become a section of the North British Railway, and from 1923 as the respective successor companies, the London Midland and Scottish Railway used London and North Eastern Railway tracks.

== Amalgamation ==
The joint working arrangement between the M&KR, the Ballochney Railway and the Slamannan Railway was working well, while the competitive pressures were increasing, and the three companies decided to amalgamate: they did so on 14 August 1848, forming a new company called the Monkland Railways.

The new company took steps to consolidate its business, building a number of branches to collieries; a longer branch to Bathgate and a new chemical works there; a branch to Bo'ness; and eventually the "New Line" joining Coatbridge and Airdrie to Bathgate direct, via Armadale.

The Monkland Railways company was absorbed by the Edinburgh and Glasgow Railway (E&GR) by the Edinburgh and Glasgow and Monkland Railways Amalgamation Act 1865 (28 & 29 Vict. c. ccxvii) dated 5 July 1865, effective from 31 July 1865. A day later (on 1 August 1865) the Edinburgh and Glasgow Railway was absorbed into the North British Railway.

== After 1865 ==
The Monkland and Kirkintilloch Railway had been built as a north-south line connecting to a canal, and the other coal railways had equally obsolescent origins. For the time being the mineral traffic was dominant, but more direct access to Glasgow was required, provided from 1871 by the Coatbridge to Glasgow line. This enabled a much more direct passenger access from the Monklands area to Glasgow, and a through route from Edinburgh to Glasgow, on an east-west axis and running briefly over the M&KR route. Trains on the north-south axis, from Motherwell towards Stirling, used the short section of the M&KR route between Gartsherrie and Garnqueen as already described.

Passing through Coatbridge, the line crossed Main Street and Bank Street at their junction by a level crossing. This was an exceedingly inconvenient arrangement, and in 1871 the Monkland Railways rebuilt the line at a higher level, crossing Bank Street by a large lattice iron bridge. There had been a mineral siding running eastward from the level crossing location to a pit and iron works near the present day Coatbank Street roundabout. When the main line was reconstructed, a new connection to the siding was formed from a junction a short distance further south, and a Sheepford goods station was provided. There was an extension to Rochsholloch Iron works and a tube works.

In 1878 the North British Railway sponsored a nominally independent railway, the Glasgow, Bothwell, Hamilton and Coatbridge Railway to develop colliery access; this connected to the Rosehall colliery line near Whifflet, giving direct access towards the ironworks of Coatbridge.

In 1895 a spur was opened from Bridgend Junction to Waterside Junction, enabling through running from the M&KR route northbound to the E&GR route eastbound, avoiding reversal at Lenzie.

In the twentieth century the best days of the Monklands iron industry were past, and gradual decline set in, and the duplication of access to the remaining pits and works was damaging for the former M&KR line.

In 1959 the two connections to the E&GR main line (at Lenzie and Waterside Junction) closed. The Sheepford section had already shut down in 1951, and the Bothwell line closed in 1955. The Cairnill and Palacecraig section closed by the 1950s. On 2 April 1966 the main line to Kirkintilloch Basin Goods Station closed north of Bedlay Colliery. That too closed in 1969 leaving a stub to Leckethill but in 1982 the line north of Gartsherrie closed completely.

== Present day (2008) ==
Two very short sections of the M&KR line remain:

- the north-south line from Sunnyside Junction to Whifflet (although the section of route was rebuilt at a higher level to eliminate the level crossing at Bank Street in 1871/2
- the eastward section from Sunnyside Junction to Greenside Junction, now part of the Glasgow – Airdrie line, electrified in 1960.

== Links to other lines and modes of transportation ==
- The Ballochney Railway at Kipps.
- The Caledonian Railway Main Line at Garnqueen South Junction and Gartsherrie North Junction.
- The Forth and Clyde Canal at Kirkintilloch
- The Garnkirk and Glasgow Railway at Gartsherrie Junction
- The Slamannan Railway
- The Wishaw and Coltness Railway
