= Wishaw and Coltness Railway =

Former railway line in Scotland

The Wishaw and Coltness Railway was an early Scottish mineral railway. It ran for approximately 11 miles (17.7 km) from Chapel Colliery, at Newmains in North Lanarkshire connecting to the Monkland and Kirkintilloch Railway near Whifflet, giving a means of transport for minerals around Newmains to market in Glasgow and Edinburgh.

Shortage of capital made construction slow, and the line was opened in stages from 1833, opening fully on 9 March 1844.

It was built to the track gauge of 4 ft 6 in (1,372 mm), commonly used in Scotland for coal railways. It had several branches serving pits and ironworks.

In 1849 it became part of the Caledonian Railway and sections of the original network form part of the modern West Coast Main Line railway.

== Formation of the railway ==
In the early decades of the 19th century, the pace of industrialisation in central Scotland accelerated considerably, generating a huge demand for the raw materials of coal and iron ore. Transport of these heavy materials to market was a key issue. Canals offered some solution to this problem, but railways came to be seen as a more accessible option. The Monkland and Kirkintilloch Railway was opened in 1828, giving access to Monklands pits to Glasgow and Edinburgh via the Forth and Clyde Canal, vastly reducing the cost of carriage. Pits further afield saw the benefit to their competitors, and thought of constructing their own lines.

A Garturk and Garion Railway bill was presented to Parliament in 1829 (though Awdry calls it the Garion and Garturk Railway). (Note: Garion, etc, was the spelling used at the time.)

Wishaw and Coltness Railway Act 1829
- Act of Parliament
- Parliament of the United Kingdom
- Long title: An Act for making a Railway from Chapel in the Parish of Cambusnethan in the County of Lanark, by Coltness and Gariongill, to join the Monkland and Kirkintilloch Railway where the same passes through the Lands of Coats or Garturk in the Parish of Old Monkland and County of Lanark.
- Citation: 10 Geo. 4. c. cvii

Dates
- Royal assent: 1 June 1829

Text of statute as originally enacted

During the parliamentary process the name was changed to the Wishaw and Coltness Railway, and under that name it was incorporated by an act of Parliament, the Wishaw and Coltness Railway Act 1829 (10 Geo. 4. c. cvii), on 1 June 1829. This authorised "making a railway from Chapel, in the parish of Cambusnethan, ...by Coltness and Gariongill, to join the Monkland and Kirkintilloch Railway ... in the parish of Old Monkland". Share capital was £80,000 with borrowing powers of £20,000. Tolls were laid down, and "the company may provide carriages for the conveyance of passengers, and charge for each person conveyed a rate of 4d per mile" and "locomotive engines may be used on the railway"

The name of the company refers to the area where minerals would originate. Coltness Colliery was in the area of Wishaw, and both places were some distance from the present-day communities. The northern end of the proposed system was a junction to another railway at Whifflet, and perhaps did not seem an attractive component when the company's name was being chosen.

Priestley says that the line was "designed to pass from the collieries of Chapel and Crawfoot, in the parish of Cambusnethan, in the county of Lanark, through Daiziel, Hamilton, Bothwell, Coltness, Overtown, Wishawtown, Motherwell, Burnhouse and Carnbroe, to join the Monkland and Kirkintilloch Railway at Old Monkland; with a branch to Rosehall; a second to the collieries of Stevenson, Carfin and Cleland; and a third from these last places to Law, in the parish of Carluke, in the same county of Lanark". Several of these objectives were never achieved in the independent lifetime of the company.

In securing parliamentary authority, the company had to accept a clause in its act forbidding the use of locomotives, to overcome the opposition of Drysdale of Jerviston, to a line which, he claimed, "would enable the Landed Proprietors south of Major Drysdale to enhance the value of their estates at the expense of his". The prohibition was later bought out for £1,000, of which the company paid half.

Wishaw and Coltness Railway Act 1834
- Act of Parliament
- Parliament of the United Kingdom
- Long title: An Act for extending the Time for completing the Wishaw and Coltness Railway in the County of Lanark.
- Citation: 4 & 5 Will. 4. c. xli

Dates
- Royal assent: 16 June 1834

Text of statute as originally enacted

Wishaw and Coltness Railway Act 1837
- Act of Parliament
- Parliament of the United Kingdom
- Long title: An Act for further extending the Time for completing the Wishaw and Coltness Railway in the County of Lanark.
- Citation: 7 Will. 4 & 1 Vict. c. c

Dates
- Royal assent: 12 July 1837

Text of statute as originally enacted

Wishaw and Coltness Railway Act 1841
- Act of Parliament
- Parliament of the United Kingdom
- Long title: An Act for enabling the Wishaw and Coltness Railway Company to raise a further Sum of Money.
- Citation: 4 & 5 Vict. c. xi

Dates
- Royal assent: 10 May 1841

Shortage of funds led to further acts, the Wishaw and Coltness Railway Act 1834 (4 & 5 Will. 4. c. xli) and the Wishaw and Coltness Railway Act 1837 (7 Will. 4 & 1 Vict. c. c) to obtain three-year extensions for completion of the railway; a further £80,000 of capital was raised by 1840 and this was followed by a further act, the Wishaw and Coltness Railway Act 1841 (4 & 5 Vict. c. xi) to raise an addition £160,000 of capital.

== Opening in stages ==
=== First section to Chapelknowe ===
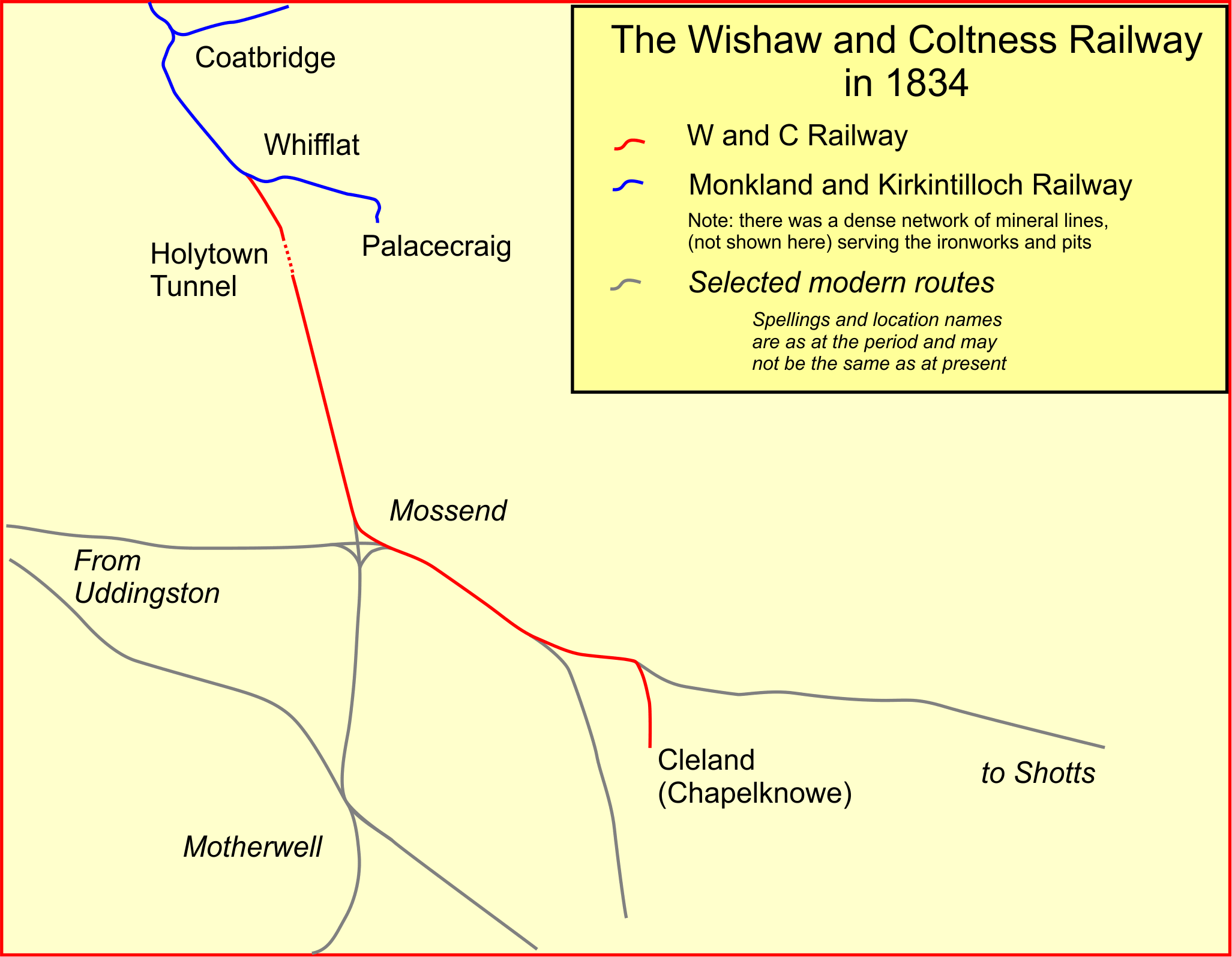
The route of the first section of the Wishaw and Coltness Railway

The new company found raising money difficult, and this considerably slowed completion of the line.

The first section was opened on 23 January 1834, running southwards from a junction with the Monkland and Kirkintilloch Railway at Whifflat Junction (as it was then spelt: immediately east of the present A725) road to "Holytown", actually on the Holytown Road, now the A775. There was a tunnel at Carnbroe Iron Works and a "Holytown Tunnel" a short distance north of the present A8 road crossing. (Note: The tunnels were opened out for the widening of the line in 1854 and 1855.)

Nine weeks later, on 31 March 1834 the line was opened to the pits at Chapelknowe: immediately south of Holytown Road the line swerved eastwards. When other parts of the line were built later, there was a continuation south and the site became, much later, Mossend North Junction. However a passenger station called Holytown was opened there in 1844, changing its name to Mossend in 1882.

Now running south-east to east, the line passed a Carfin station (renamed Holytown in 1882) and a Newarthill station (renamed Carfin in 1928). As far as this point, the route is still in operation today as Whifflet—Mossend North Junction—Holytown—Carfin, but here the original line turned south to serve several pits in the Cleland estate at Chapelknowe.

=== Coltness Estate ===
In 1836 Thomas Houldsworth, a Manchester entrepreneur, purchased the Coltness Estate, with its extensive mineral rights. At this time the railway company had run out of money to complete the building of their line. "In order to allow the development of his minerals, Houldsworth agreed that if the company extended their line to Coltness, for which they would require to borrow £20,000 and to get an act of Parliament allowing an extension of time for construction, he would personally guarantee the interest on the loan, and pay £300 towards the expenses of obtaining what became the Wishaw and Coltness Railway Act 1837. He also agree to give the necessary land on the Coltness Estate free (apart from compensation to tenants) and to send all his goods by the railway, if the Company charged him the prevailing rate." He also agreed to pay half of the payment to the Drysdale estate to buy out the prohibition on locomotives.

=== Reaching Jerviston ===
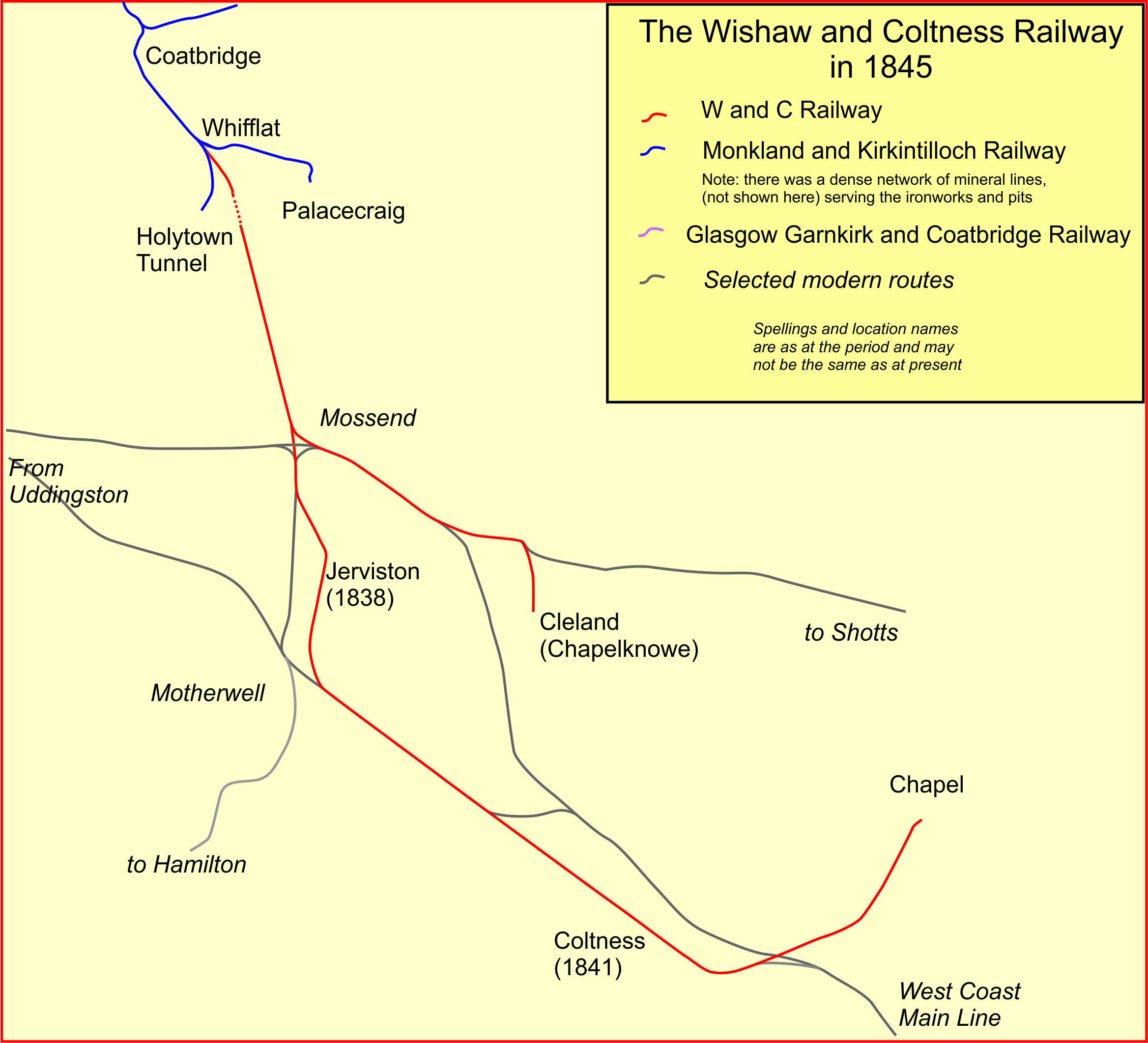
Wishaw and Coltness Railway system in 1845

As money became available, the next extension (actually the intended "main line") was built, about 1 mile (1.6 km) long, and opening in 1838, running due south from the junction at "Holytown" (i.e. Mossend North Junction) to "Jerviston", serving several pits. The location was at the north end of the (later) Ravenscraig complex, and the route was to the east of the present Mossend - Motherwell line (opened in 1857).

=== On to "Coltness" ===
In 1841 the next section was opened, from Jerviston to Overton (now spelt Overtown). Continuing south from Jerviston and crossing the Clyde, the line turned south-east at Motherwell Junction, a little distance south-east of the present-day station there; from there the line formed the route of the present West Coast Main Line, serving coal and ironstone pits and clay pits and reaching Coltness Colliery, which was in the area between the bridges at Pather and Overtown.

=== To Chapel at last ===
In 1842 a further extension was opened, taking the line on from Coltness Colliery to Chapel Colliery—the first-named objective in Priestley's description—in the area of Morningside. This was immediately east of the Stirling Road (later A73). Passenger stations were opened in 1845 at Overtown and "Carluke"; the Carluke station was on the Stirling Road near the site of the old Law Hospital.

=== Morningside ===
The final stage in the gradual extension of the route was achieved on 9 March 1844; continuing from Chapel Colliery, the line ran the short distance to pits and a brick and tile works close to Morningside, involving a bridge over the Auchter Water. (Note: James states that this is the date when the line reached Chapel.)

== Wilsontown, Morningside and Coltness Railway ==
In 1845 the Wilsontown, Morningside and Coltness Railway (WM&CR) opened its line, on 2 June. The new railway sought to connect pits further east to the developing network towards the Monklands and the Clyde, and was therefore dependent on the Wishaw and Coltness Railway. The newcomer was always short of money and never succeeded to connecting the important iron works at Wilsontown, and the inspecting officer for passenger operation wrote that "the line terminates in a large field, about a mile from a small village called Whitburn."

The newcomer built a Morningside terminus, facing east, in the north-east angle of Mill Road and Morningside Road, and built a short connection to the Wishaw and Coltness Railway (W&CR) on the west side of Morningside Road. The W&CR promptly built its own Morningside station at that point, abutting the road, and 2 chains (44.0 yd; 40.2 m) from the WM&CR station.

== Operation ==
Like the other coal railways built in the same period, the railway thought of itself as analogous to a canal, where it provided a route and independent hauliers provided wagons and horses to pull them, and paid the company a toll for the privilege. In fact the original Wishaw and Coltness Railway Act 1829 stipulated that "Owners of land may erect wharfs, warehouses and cranes on the line, and if they refuse the company may do so, charging for the use thereof [certain laid down charges]"

By 1838 the Garnkirk and Glasgow Railway (G&GR) was operating locomotives over the G&GR and the W&CR.

In 1839 the company decided to adopt locomotive traction, and to reduce the multiplicity of horse traders, in order to "do away with the collisions which are daily taking place between the drivers".

In 1842 the company bought 323 wagons from the independent hauliers on their line to reduce the number of traders on the line and to keep down the complaints from traders that locomotives were damaging their wagons.

The wagons were primitive and unsprung, and when the Caledonian Railway was later negotiating to purchase the line, it was essential to be able to report that "new wagons with springs and entire new engines have been put on".

In 1843–1845, 1,057,431 tons were carried by the company, of which 61.2% were conveyed by the company itself, and the balance by independent hauliers.

In this period, attention was being drawn to the high proportion of operating costs: of £11,125 annual average revenue in 1839–1843, 36.9% of that figure was expended in operation.

== Locomotives ==
The Wishaw and Coltness company acquired three locomotives designed by Robert Dodds and built by James M Rowan of Glasgow: they were named Wishaw, Coltness and Cleland; they started work at the end of 1840. It was reported that

When received, they were forthwith applied to the purpose of the traffic, and they have provided the advantages to be derived on this as on the adjoining railways from the more general employment of engines instead of horse haulage. In all cases they have been found to be of great service to the prosperity of the Company's revenue.

== Passengers ==
The company started a passenger service to Coatbridge on 8 May 1845 (Note: Paterson says 1845 but this may be a misprint; similarly the through coach to Townhead is printed as from Townhead) leaving Morningside at 7.07 a.m., and calling at Stirling Road, Overtown Road, Wishaw, Motherwell, Holytown and Carnbroe Iron Works, arriving at Coatbridge at 8.50 a.m. A through coach was taken on by the Glasgow, Garnkirk and Coatbridge Railway (GG&CR) to its Townhead terminal in Glasgow, and there was a corresponding late afternoon return service. Through tickets were issued from Lanark, by omnibus to Stirling Road to connect, and the GG&CR later developed tourism by this route, advertising the scenic beauty of the Falls of Clyde at Lanark, using a morning outward service and afternoon return.

Names of the early passenger stations bear little resemblance to modern naming. From the junction at Whifflet, they were:

Cleland line:

- Carnbroe (or Carnbroe Iron Works), opened 1843, closed about 1846
- Holytown (located at the later Mossend North Junction); opened 1844, renamed Mossend 1882, closed 1962
- Carfin, opened in about 1834, renamed Holytown in 1882, still in operation
- Newarthill (located at the present-day Carfin station); opened in 1834, closed in 1880

Coltness line:

- Motherwell (located a short distance south of the present station); opened 1845, closed in 1885 when the present station opened
- Flemington, opened in 1891, closed in 1965
- Shieldmuir, opened 1990
- Wishaw, opened in 1845; renamed Wishaw South in 1880 when the new line from Holytown Junction to Law Junction opened; closed in 1958
- Overtown, opened in 1845; closed in 1881
- Carluke (located a considerable distance from the present Carluke station); opened 1845, renamed Stirling Road, Morningside in 1848; closed in 1853
- Morningside, opened in 1845, closed in 1930

The Morningside line became a minor branch off the West Coast Main Line when the Caledonian Railway took over the Company, and the passenger service probably ceased in 1853.

When the Caledonian Railway built a new line via Newmains, it approached Morningside from the north and a passenger service from Holytown terminated there. In 1895 and in 1922 there were five trains each way with one extra on Saturdays. The Wilsontown, Morningside and Coltness Railway operated a service from its own Morningside station, 40 m away by rail, heading east to Bathgate. There was not much co-ordination of train times, and the 40 m of railway between the two stations did not have a passenger service.

== Wider horizons ==
The line was built as a coal railway, with the primary object of conveying the mineral to market in central Scotland. The industrial processes developed rapidly during the first decade of the line's existence, so did the demand for efficient transport. As the Coltness Iron Works and other industries developed, they needed to bring in materials from further afield, and to dispatch their products to far-off destinations.

In common with the other "coal railways" the technical limitations of the little railway became more obvious, and the most important of these was the track gauge of 4 ft 6 in, which required transshipment of loads at the point of connection with standard gauge lines. In 1847, the railway changed its gauge to the standard 4 ft 8½ in.

The Caledonian Railway was being promoted about the same time, with the object of participating in forming a main line route between Central Scotland and Carlisle, connecting there with the English railway trunk network. At the time the Grand Junction Railway was planning an approach from the south to Carlisle.

Caledonian Railway (Wishaw and Coltness Railway Purchase) Act 1849
- Act of Parliament
- Parliament of the United Kingdom
- Long title: An Act to effect the Sale of the Wishaw and Coltness Railway to the Caledonian Railway Company.
- Citation: 12 & 13 Vict. c. lxvii

Dates
- Royal assent: 28 July 1849

Text of statute as originally enacted

The Caledonian Railway promoters planned an entry through Annandale. To get access to Glasgow, the Caledonian secured agreement from the Wishaw and Coltness Railway and the Glasgow Garnkirk and Coatbridge Railway to use their lines for the approach to the city. The Caledonian took a lease of the Wishaw and Coltness from 1 January 1847, guaranteeing 10.5% on the W&CR capitalisation of £240,000. (Agreement to lease the GG&CR had been obtained a year earlier at 8%.) The Caledonian the bought the W&CR under the Caledonian Railway (Wishaw and Coltness Railway Purchase) Act 1849 (12 & 13 Vict. c. lxvii).

For the time being the Caledonian used the GG&CR Townhead terminus in Glasgow, but soon extended to a new terminal at Glasgow, Buchanan Street.

Parts of the Wishaw and Coltness routes remain in use at the present day: the section from the original Motherwell station, just south-east of the present-day station, to Garriongill Junction, and the section from Whifflet to Mossend South Junction follows the original construction.
