= Carfin railway station =

Railway station in North Lanarkshire, Scotland

Carfin Scottish Gaelic: An Càrm Fionn
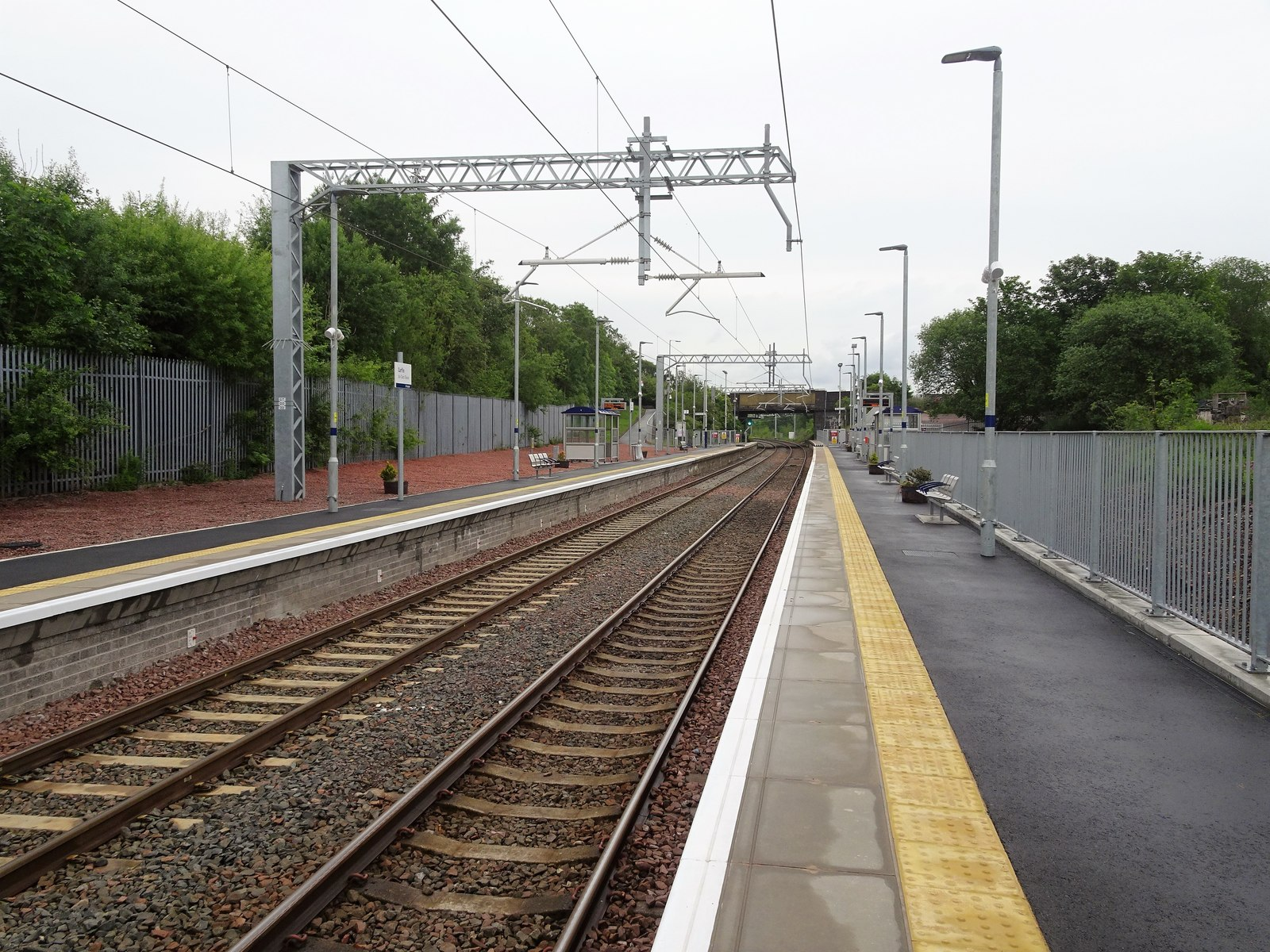
- Carfin in 2019, following electrification

General information
- Location: Newarthill, North Lanarkshire; Scotland
- Coordinates: 55.8076°N 3.9556°W
- Grid reference: NS775588
- Managed by: ScotRail
- Platforms: 2

Other information
- Station code: CRF

History
- Original company: LMS

Key dates
- ?: Opened as Carfin Halt
- 1 December 1930: Closed
- ?: Reopened
- 16 May 1983: Renamed

Passengers
- 2020/21: ▼17,510
- 2021/22: ▲65,146
- 2022/23: ▲87,220
- 2023/24: ▲0.117 million
- 2024/25: ▲0.119 million
Location
Notes
- Passenger statistics from the Office of Rail and Road

Carfin railway station is a railway station serving both Carfin and Newarthill in North Lanarkshire, Scotland. It is 14 miles (22 km) southeast of Glasgow Central railway station on the Shotts Line between Glasgow and Edinburgh.

It contains two platforms; one for trains in the direction of Glasgow, and the other for trains to Edinburgh Waverley via Shotts.

Like the following stop on the Shotts Line, Holytown, the location of the station is ambiguous. It is located on the border between Carfin and Newarthill, for much of its recent history closer to a housing estate in the latter. It is now bordered immediately on both sides by housing developments.

== Services ==
Trains from Carfin station provide an hourly service to the heart of Glasgow, stopping along the way at Holytown, Bellshill and Uddingston. Cambuslang is only served at peak times (and has been since December 2013), whilst there is a single evening train to Motherwell. In the opposite direction there is also an hourly service, calling at all stations except Breich en route to Edinburgh. A 2 hourly service runs on Sundays.

Preceding station	National Rail	Following station
Cleland	ScotRail; Shotts Line	Holytown
	Historical railways	
Omoa	Cleland and Midcalder Line; Caledonian Railway	Holytown
Cleland (Old); Line and station closed	Wishaw and Coltness Railway; Caledonian Railway	connection to Cleland and Midcalder Line

== Sources ==
- Brailsford, Martyn, ed. (December 2017) [1987]. Railway Track Diagrams 1: Scotland & Isle of Man (6th ed.). Frome: Trackmaps. ISBN 978-0-9549866-9-8.
- Butt, R. V. J. (October 1995). The Directory of Railway Stations: details every public and private passenger station, halt, platform and stopping place, past and present (1st ed.). Sparkford: Patrick Stephens Ltd. ISBN 978-1-85260-508-7. OCLC 60251199. OL 11956311M.
