= Newpark railway station =

Former railway station in Scotland

Newpark
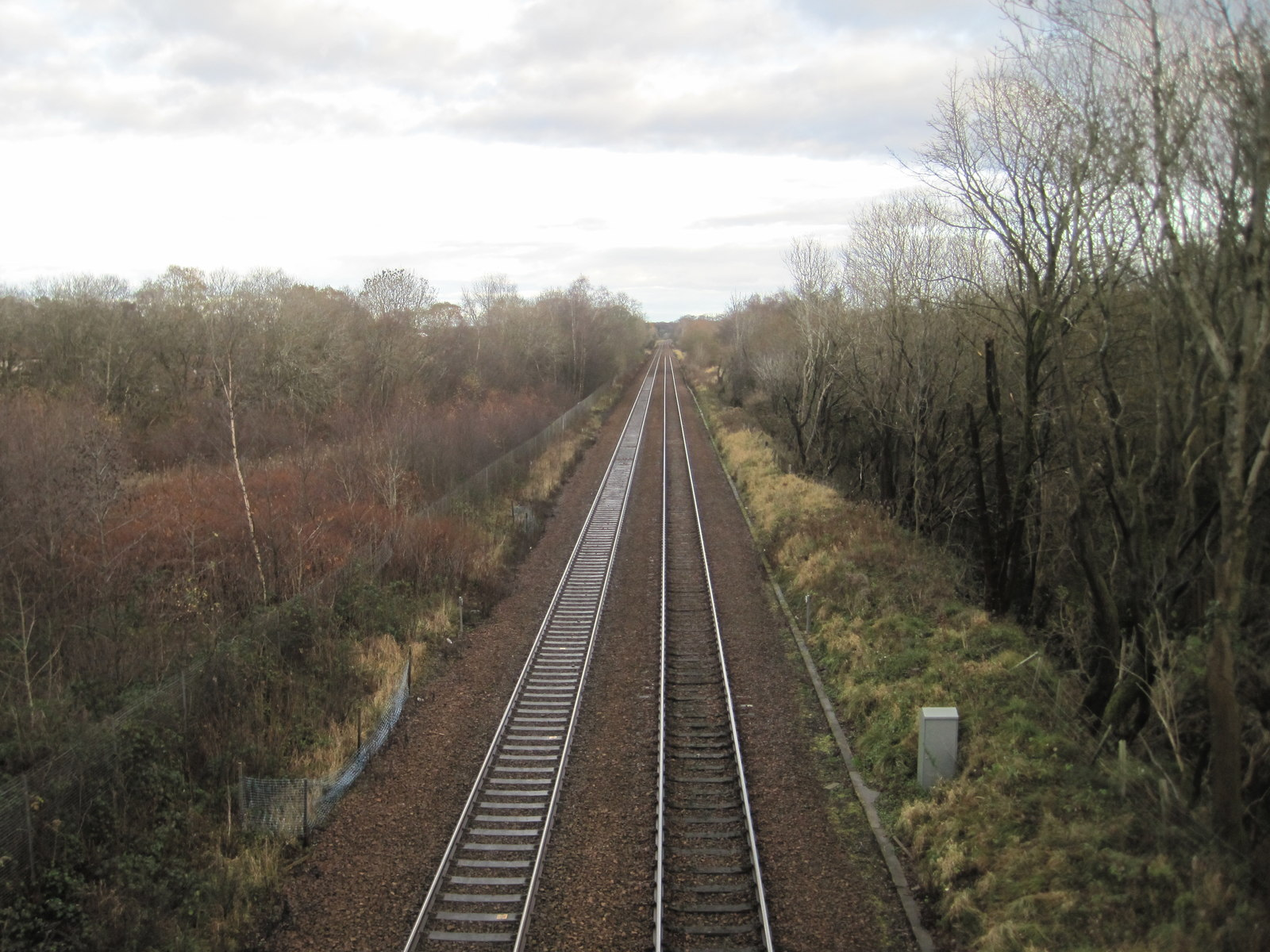
- The site of the station in 2016

General information
- Location: Bellsquarry, West Lothian; Scotland
- Coordinates: 55.8649°N 3.5195°W
- Platforms: 2

Other information
- Status: Disused

History
- Original company: Cleland and Midcalder Line
- Pre-grouping: Caledonian Railway
- Post-grouping: LMS

Key dates
- 11 October 1869: Opened
- 14 September 1959: Closed
Location

Newpark railway station was a railway station serving Newpark near Bellsquarry in West Lothian, then called Linlithgowshire. It was on the Cleland and Midcalder Line between Edinburgh and Glasgow. Trains on the Shotts Line still pass through the site of the former station.

== History ==
When the Caledonian Railway opened the Cleland and Midcalder Line in 1869, Newpark railway station was the most easterly station on the line around 4 kilometres (2.5 mi) from Mid Calder Junction, with the Caledonian Railway Main Line. It was situated where the Murieston Road crosses over the line. Once was surrounded by fields, the station site is now on the south west edge Livingston, with housing to the north and south of the station site although fields remain to the west. The station site can still be seen from aerial views.

Preceding station	Historical railways	Following station
West Calder; Line and station open	Caledonian Railway; Cleland and Midcalder Line	Mid Calder; Line and station open
