= Holytown railway station =

Railway station in North Lanarkshire, Scotland

Holytown Scottish Gaelic: Baile a' Chuilinn
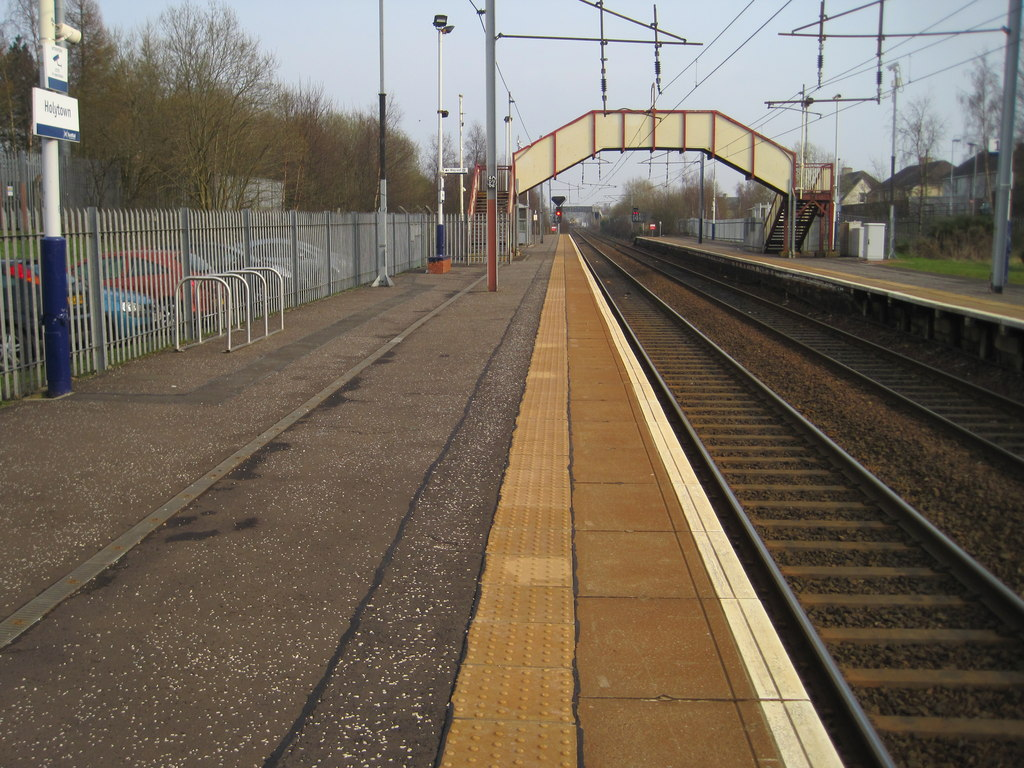

General information
- Location: New Stevenston, North Lanarkshire; Scotland
- Coordinates: 55.8126°N 3.9736°W
- Grid reference: NS764594
- Manager: ScotRail
- Platforms: 2

Other information
- Station code: HLY

Key dates
- 1 June 1880: Opened as Carfin
- 1 January 1882: Renamed Carfin Junction
- 1 June 1882: Renamed Holytown Junction
- 1 October 1901: Renamed Holytown

Passengers
- 2021/22: ▲85,942
- 2022/23: ▲0.122 million
- 2023/24: ▲0.157 million
- 2024/25: ▲0.165 million
- 2025/26: ▲0.175 million
- Interchange: 3
Location
Notes
- Passenger statistics from the Office of Rail and Road

Holytown railway station is a railway station serving both Holytown and New Stevenston in North Lanarkshire, Scotland. It is located on the Shotts Line, 13 miles (21 km) south east of Glasgow Central towards Edinburgh Waverley and is also on the Argyle Line. It was opened in 1880 (as 'Carfin') at the same time as the Wishaw Deviation Line from Law Junction, though the line on which it actually stands (the Wishaw and Coltness Railway) is considerably older.

Despite its name, the station is some 550 yards (500 m) from the edge of Holytown; instead it is in New Stevenston.

The station was opened to assist the coal mining industry; the mines are now long gone.

Around 2003, some services to Lanark on the Argyle Line began running via Holytown (by means of the Mossend South to East curve) then down to Wishaw, creating two routes (one via Holytown and the other via the already existing Shieldmuir). This created a twice-hourly service at Holytown to/from Glasgow and a regular link to/from Motherwell.

== Services ==
=== 2008 onward ===
Monday to Saturdays on the Shotts Line there is an hourly service westbound to Glasgow via Uddingston and eastbound to Edinburgh. Sunday services only run from Glasgow Central via Whifflet to Shotts for the month prior to Christmas.

However, from December 2012 a new two hourly service has operated between Glasgow Central and Edinburgh.

On the Argyle Line there is an hourly service northbound to Glasgow Central and beyond (to Milngavie) and southbound to Lanark via Motherwell with no Sunday service.

=== December 2014 ===
Following a recast of the Argyle Line timetable in the wake of the Whifflet Line electrification, there is no longer a regular daytime service to Motherwell, Milngavie via Anderston or Lanark. Only the hourly (two-hourly Sunday) Shotts line stopping services now call here – one of these in each direction (06:00 Motherwell to Edinburgh Waverley ) now provides the statutory minimum service from Motherwell over the Mossend South Jcn to East Jcn curve. A single weekday peak service from Carstairs to Garscadden in the morning, returning from Anderston to Carstairs in the evening fulfils the same function for the line from Wishaw.

Preceding station	National Rail	Following station
Carfin	ScotRail; Glasgow Central – Edinburgh Waverley	Bellshill
Carfin	ScotRail; Glasgow Central – Edinburgh Waverley	Motherwell
	Historical railways	
Carfin	Cleland and Midcalder Line	Bellshill
Wishaw Central	Caledonian Railway Main Line	Motherwell
Wishaw Central	Caledonian Railway Main Line	Mossend; Line open; station closed

== Sources ==
- Brailsford, Martyn, ed. (December 2017) [1987]. Railway Track Diagrams 1: Scotland & Isle of Man (6th ed.). Frome: Trackmaps. ISBN 978-0-9549866-9-8.
- Butt, R. V. J. (October 1995). The Directory of Railway Stations: details every public and private passenger station, halt, platform and stopping place, past and present (1st ed.). Sparkford: Patrick Stephens Ltd. ISBN 978-1-85260-508-7. OCLC 60251199. OL 11956311M.
- RAILSCOT on Caledonian Railway
- RAILSCOT on Cleland and Midcalder Line
