= Kirknewton railway station =

Railway station in West Lothian, Scotland

Kirknewton Scottish Gaelic: Eaglais a' Bhaile Ùir
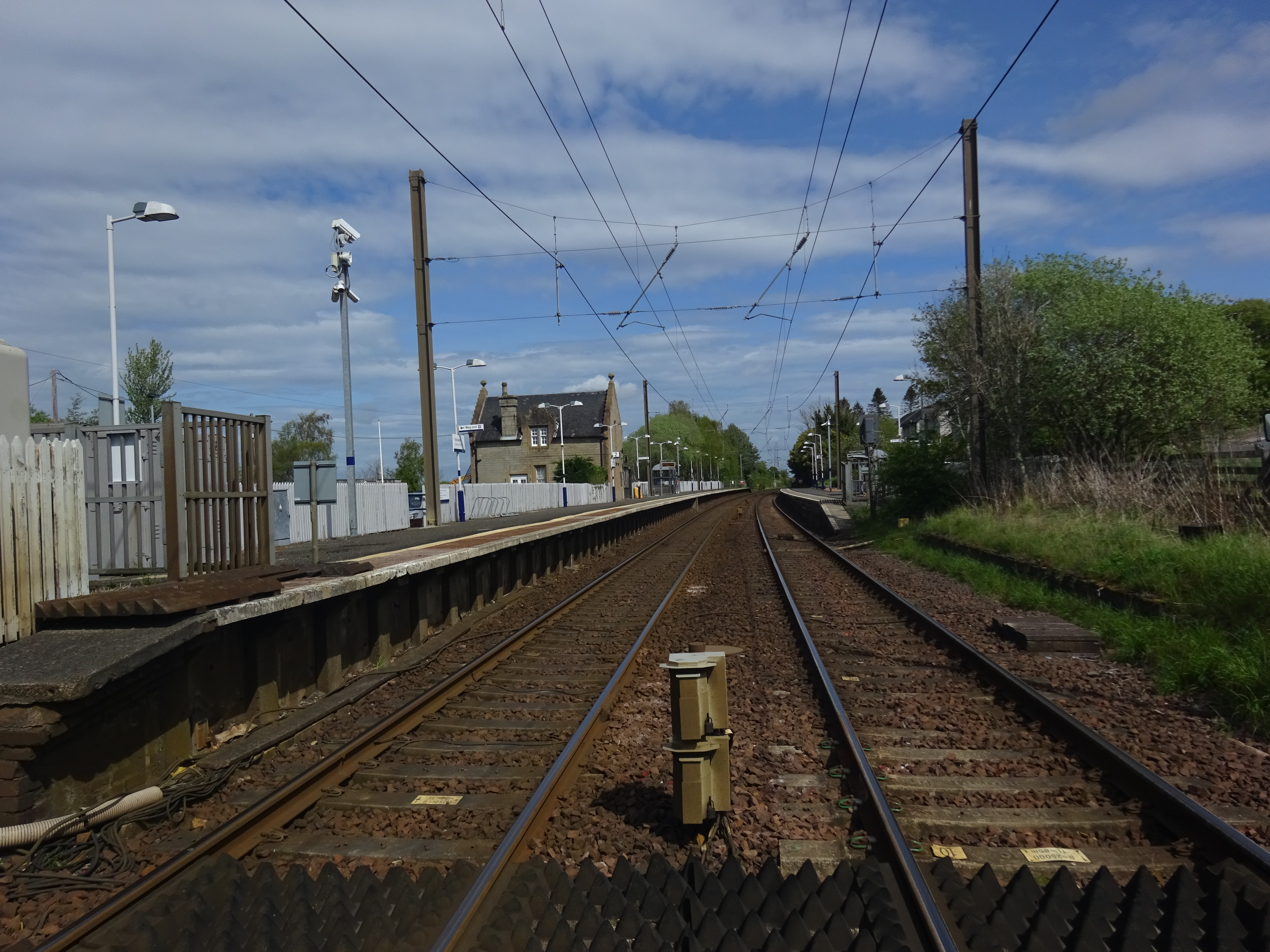
- The station viewed from the level crossing

General information
- Location: Kirknewton, West Lothian; Scotland
- Coordinates: 55.8890°N 3.4332°W
- Grid reference: NT104671
- Manager: ScotRail
- Platforms: 2

Other information
- Station code: KKN

History
- Pre-grouping: Caledonian Railway
- Post-grouping: LMS

Key dates
- 15 February 1848: Opened as Kirknewton
- April 1848: Renamed Midcalder and Kirknewton
- c. 1855: Renamed Midcalder
- 17 May 1982: Renamed Kirknewton

Passengers
- 2020/21: ▼6,036
- 2021/22: ▲28,024
- 2022/23: ▲39,750
- 2023/24: ▲63,714
- 2024/25: ▲71,168
Location
Notes
- Passenger statistics from the Office of Rail and Road

Kirknewton railway station is a railway station serving the village of Kirknewton in West Lothian, Scotland, Opened as Kirknewton in February 1848, the station was renamed Midcalder and Kirknewton after two months, before becoming Midcalder in 1855. The full circle was finally completed 127 years later in May 1982 when the name reverted to Kirknewton. This was to distinguish it from Kirknewton station near Mindrum on the NER Cornhill Branch.

The station lies on the Edinburgh branch of the West Coast Main Line, although it is not served by main line express services - it is served by commuter services on the Shotts Line from Glasgow Central to Edinburgh Waverley via Shotts. It is managed by ScotRail.

As there is no footbridge on the station (the footbridge was removed prior to electrification), passengers wishing to cross the line must do so via the level crossing, which is one of the most incorrectly used in Scotland. There are plans to provide a new crossing (subway) which will remove the level crossing. The level crossing is automatic and approach controlled which means trains which call at the station towards Glasgow have to stop so the driver can turn on the level crossing, This is done to allow traffic to cross when the train is stopped in the station.

== History ==
Kirknewton station opened on 15 February 1848 on the Caledonian Railway's Edinburgh and Carstairs line. The station was located near Ravelrig Junction, where the Caledonian Railway's Balerno Branch connected with the main line. Opened in 1874, the branch ran from Ravelrig Junction through Balerno, Currie, Juniper Green and Colinton to Slateford. Services from Edinburgh could operate through the branch to Balerno and then continue via Ravelrig Junction towards Midcalder, with the branch also serving local mills and other industries along the Water of Leith. Passenger services on the Balerno Branch were withdrawn on 30 October 1943, although goods traffic continued on the line. The western section between Ravelrig Junction and Balerno Goods closed in 1963, while the remaining section was closed to all traffic on 4 December 1967 following the closure of Kinleith Mill in 1966.

== Services ==
The station is served on Mondays to Saturdays by an hourly ScotRail stopping service between Glasgow Central and Edinburgh Waverley. There is a limited Sunday service to Edinburgh and Glasgow of just six trains each way. One service on this route originates at Motherwell in the morning, returning there in the evening.

As this station is on the Edinburgh branch of the West Coast Main Line; a variety of Avanti West Coast, CrossCountry, London North Eastern Railway and TransPennine Express trains pass through without stopping.

Preceding station	National Rail	Following station
Curriehill	ScotRail; Shotts Line	Livingston South
Curriehill	ScotRail; Glasgow–Edinburgh via Carstairs line Limited service	Carstairs
	Historical railways	
Connection at Midcalder Junction	Caledonian Railway; Cleland and Midcalder Line	Newpark
Ravelrig Halt	Caledonian Railway; Main Line	Harburn
