= Addiewell railway station =

Railway station in West Lothian, Scotland

Addiewell Scottish Gaelic: Tobar Adaidh
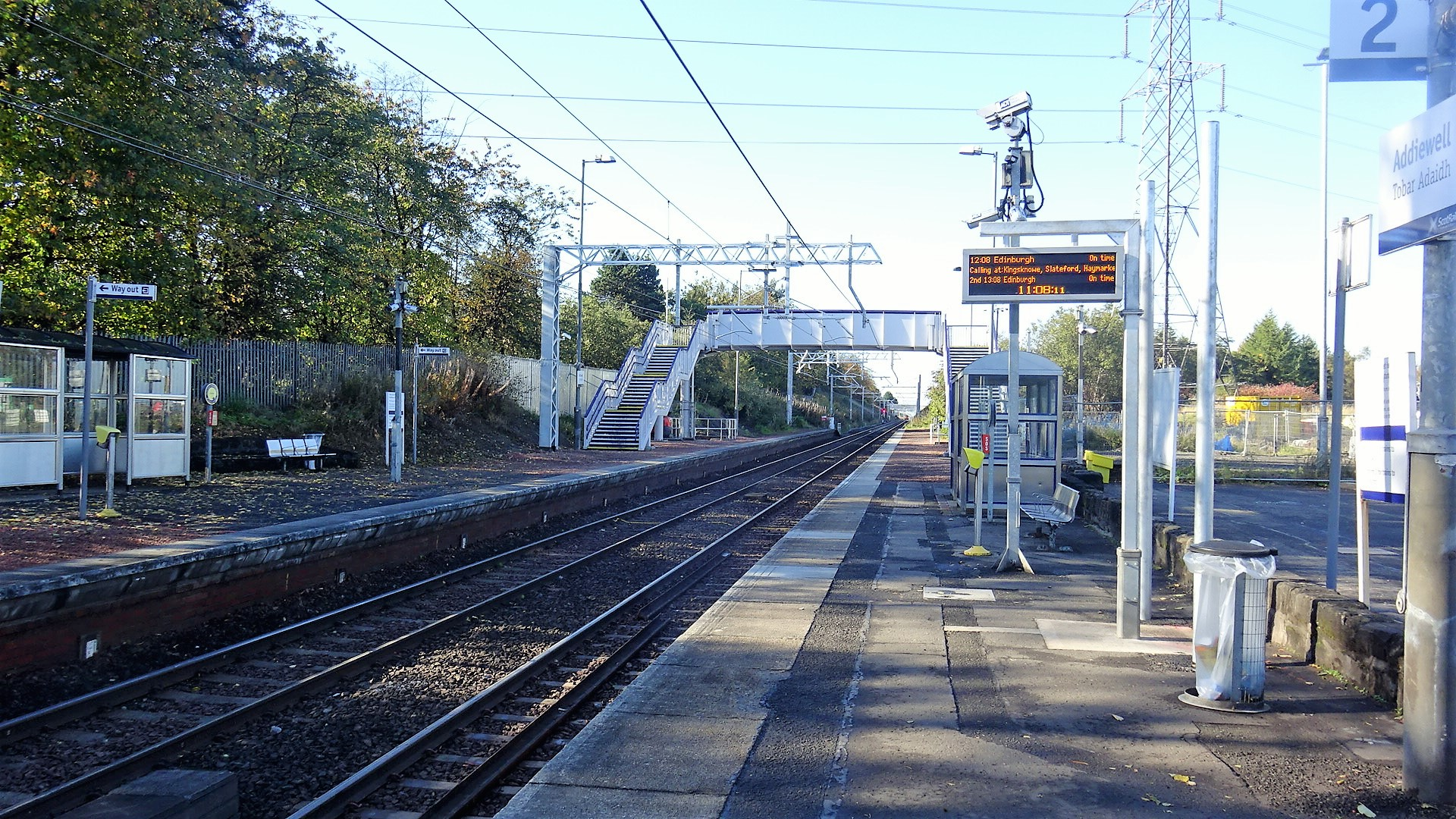
- Addiewell railway station, looking west

General information
- Location: Addiewell, West Lothian; Scotland
- Coordinates: 55.8434°N 3.6064°W
- Grid reference: NS995623
- Manager: ScotRail
- Platforms: 2

Other information
- Station code: ADW

Key dates
- 1 July 1882: Station opens

Passengers
- 2021/22: ▲11,226
- 2022/23: ▲14,566
- 2023/24: ▲17,680
- 2024/25: ▲18,496
- 2025/26: ▲22,420
Location
Notes
- Passenger statistics from the Office of Rail and Road

Addiewell railway station is a railway station serving Addiewell in West Lothian, Scotland. It is located on the Shotts Line from Glasgow Central to Edinburgh Waverley via Shotts.

== History ==
Opened by the Caledonian Railway in July 1882 (several years after the line itself), it became part of the London, Midland and Scottish Railway during the Grouping of 1923. The line then passed on to the Scottish Region of British Railways on nationalisation in 1948.

When sectorisation was introduced, the station was served by ScotRail until the Privatisation of British Rail.

Network Rail opened a new footbridge at the station in 2018.

== Passenger volume ==
Passenger Volume at Addiewell
	2019-20	2020-21	2021-22	2022-23
Entries and exits	17,242	1,762	11226	14,566

== Service ==
Monday to Saturday sees an hourly service to Edinburgh and Glasgow serving most intermediate stations, this drops to 2-hourly in the evening. There is one service a day to and from Motherwell.

Sundays see a 2-hourly service in both directions, not calling at Breich or Cambuslang.

Preceding station	National Rail	Following station
West Calder	ScotRail; Shotts Line	Breich
