= Breich railway station =

Railway station in West Lothian, Scotland

Breich Scottish Gaelic: Brìch
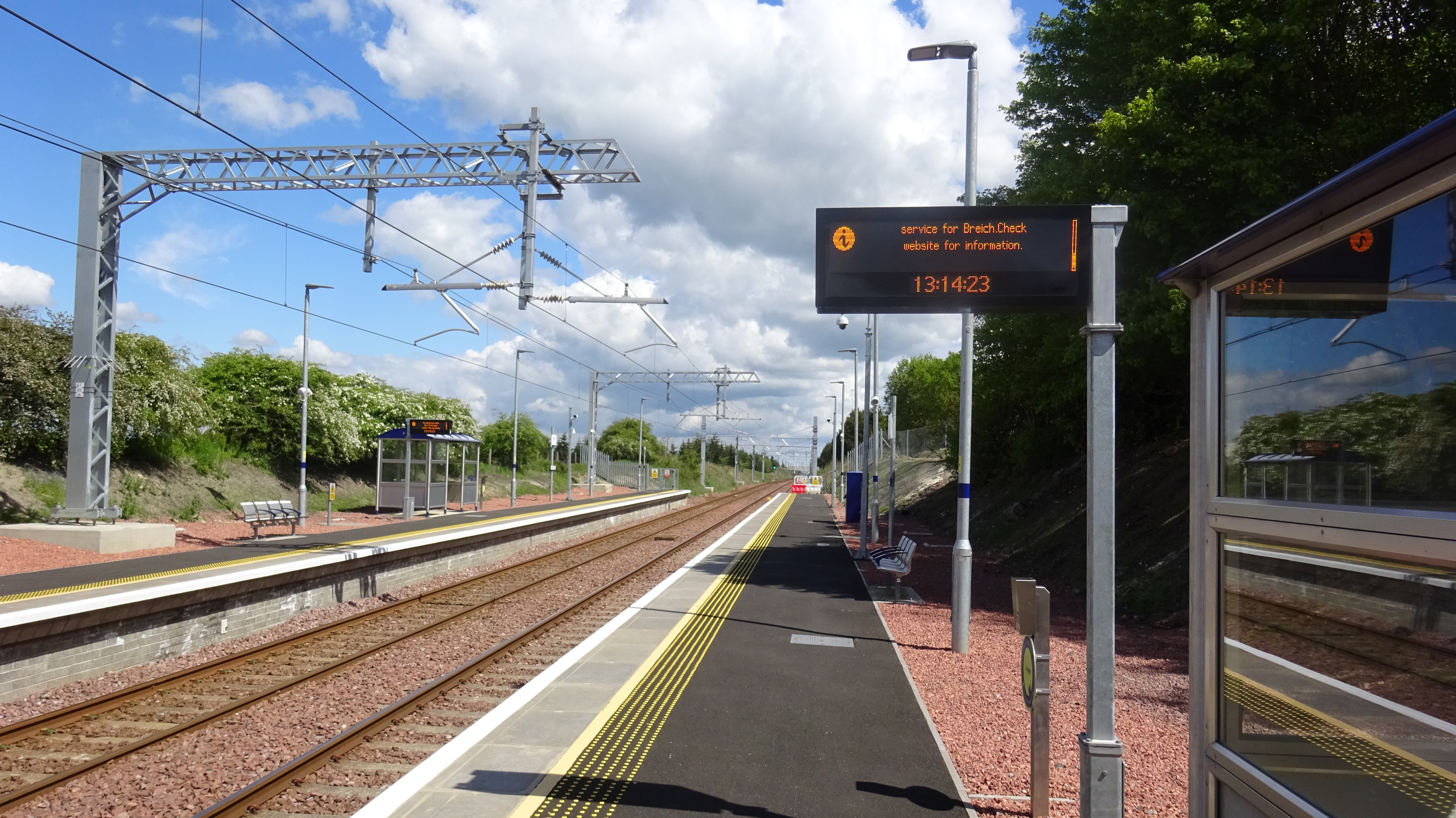

General information
- Location: Breich, West Lothian; Scotland
- Coordinates: 55.8275°N 3.6675°W
- Grid reference: NS956606
- Manager: ScotRail
- Platforms: 2

Other information
- Station code: BRC

Key dates
- 9 July 1869: Opened

Passengers
- 2021/22: ▲3,638
- 2022/23: ▲4,484
- 2023/24: ▲6,036
- 2024/25: ▼5,924
- 2025/26: ▼5,338
Location
Notes
- Passenger statistics from the Office of Rail and Road

Breich railway station is a rural railway station serving the village of Breich in West Lothian, Scotland. It is located on the Shotts Line, 14 miles (23 km) from Mossend North Junction, and is located between Addiewell and Fauldhouse. It was the sixth-least-used station in the UK until 2018-19 and was the second-least-used in Scotland, after Barry Links as well as being the least used station in West Lothian.

== History ==
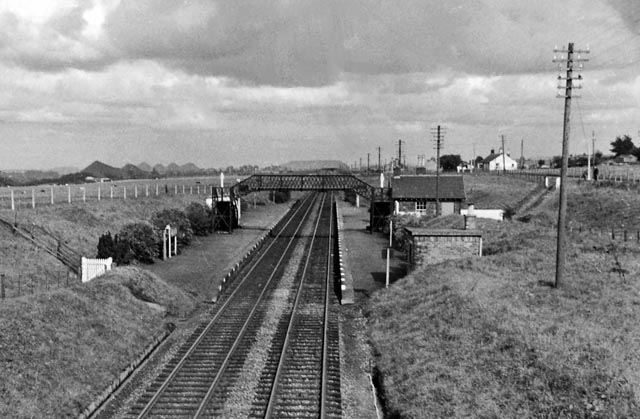
The station in 1962

The station was opened by the Caledonian Railway on their Cleland and Midcalder Line on 9 July 1869. Breich is named after the nearby Breich Water. The station pre-dates the present-day village of Breich.

The surrounding area, although now very rural, was once highly industrialised with several collieries, lime works and iron workings nearby, together with the Levenseat Branch of the North British Railway and the originally 4 ft 6 in (1,372 mm) Scotch gauge Wilsontown, Morningside and Coltness line with its old terminus station of Longridge, which opened in 1845 and closed in 1848.

=== Proposed closure ===
The station seen in 2016 before the proposed closure

On 21 June 2017, Network Rail announced that they had begun consultation on the proposed closure of the station due to low patronage and if retained will avoid heavy expenditure to update the station prior to electrification of the line, claiming that the low patronage at the station would not justify the cost of improving the station - approximately £1.4 million - to meet modern accessibility standards. It would have been the first station in Scotland to close in over 30 years, after Balloch Pier in 1986. A petition was started to "Save Breich Station". Some commented that, if closed, a precedent would be set to close stations "by stealth".

In November 2017, after the 12 week consultation, the Scottish Government confirmed that the station would remain open and would have improved service levels following upgrades to the station and electrification.

The station was closed temporarily from 23 June 2018 for 12 weeks during redevelopment as part of a £2.4 million project to make it suitable for new electric trains. The redevelopment included work to the platforms in order to make them compliant in both height and length for the new services, as well as ensuring ramped access to both platforms and improvements to station facilities such as new waiting shelters and ticket machines. The footbridge was removed at this time with access gained from the upgraded road overbridge.

== Facilities ==
A ticket office and waiting room was still present in 1962 as shown by the photograph of that date, together with a linesman's brick hut building, both on the Glasgow bound platform.

By 2018, the station's facilities had been reduced to a single shelter (on the Edinburgh-bound platform), a bench on the Glasgow-bound platform, a help point and station announcements.

The station was rebuilt in 2018 and consequently lost the old pedestrian overbridge and wooden shelter. It has new platforms, two modern style passenger shelters, additional outside seating and electronic travel information displays. Access from platform 1 to 2 is via the rebuilt road overbridge.

== Passenger volume ==
In 2014–15, Breich was the tenth least-used station in Britain, with 92 passenger exits and entries. The Times reported that the station had one regular commuter in 2003.

West Lothian Council's Route Utilisation Strategy suggests that if there was an increase in service frequency on the Shotts Line more services could stop at Breich. This could help future developments in the Breich and Longridge areas.

Passenger volume at Breich
	2004–05	2005–06	2006–07	2007–08	2008–09	2009–10	2010–11	2011–12	2012–13	2013–14	2014–15	2015–16	2016–17	2017–18	2018–19	2019–20	2020–21	2021–22	2022–23	2023–24	2024–25
Entries and exits	118	53	75	303	200	116	68	90	102	64	92	138	48	102	342	2,550	220	3,638	4,484	6,036	5,924

The statistics cover twelve month periods that start in April.

== Services ==
Before the increase in services, the station was served by one eastbound towards Edinburgh and one westbound train towards Glasgow Central per day, on weekdays and Saturdays. There was no Sunday service. From May 2019, an hourly service was introduced on weekdays and Saturdays, and a 2 hourly service on Sundays.

Preceding station	National Rail	Following station
Addiewell	ScotRail; Shotts Line	Fauldhouse
	Historical railways	
Addiewell; Line and station open	Caledonian Railway; Cleland and Midcalder Line	Fauldhouse
Newpark; Loop line and station closed	Caledonian Railway; Cleland and Midcalder Line; Addiewell Loop	Fauldhouse

== Bibliography ==
- Brailsford, Martyn, ed. (December 2017) [1987]. Railway Track Diagrams 1: Scotland & Isle of Man (6th ed.). Frome: Trackmaps. ISBN 978-0-9549866-9-8.
- Butt, R. V. J. (October 1995). The Directory of Railway Stations: details every public and private passenger station, halt, platform and stopping place, past and present (1st ed.). Sparkford: Patrick Stephens Ltd. ISBN 978-1-85260-508-7. OCLC 60251199. OL 11956311M.
- Caton, Peter (2018). Remote Stations. Leicestershire: Matador. ISBN 978-1-78901-408-2.
