= Mohawk Village, Ohio =

Unincorporated community in Ohio, U.S.

Coordinates: 40°19′30″N 82°04′47″W

Mohawk Village (also called Jericho) is an unincorporated community in Coshocton County, in the U.S. state of Ohio.

== History ==
Mohawk Village was laid out in 1859 as a center for the manufacturing of coal oil. The community took its name from nearby Mohawk Run.
