= Cleland railway station =

Railway station in North Lanarkshire, Scotland

Cleland
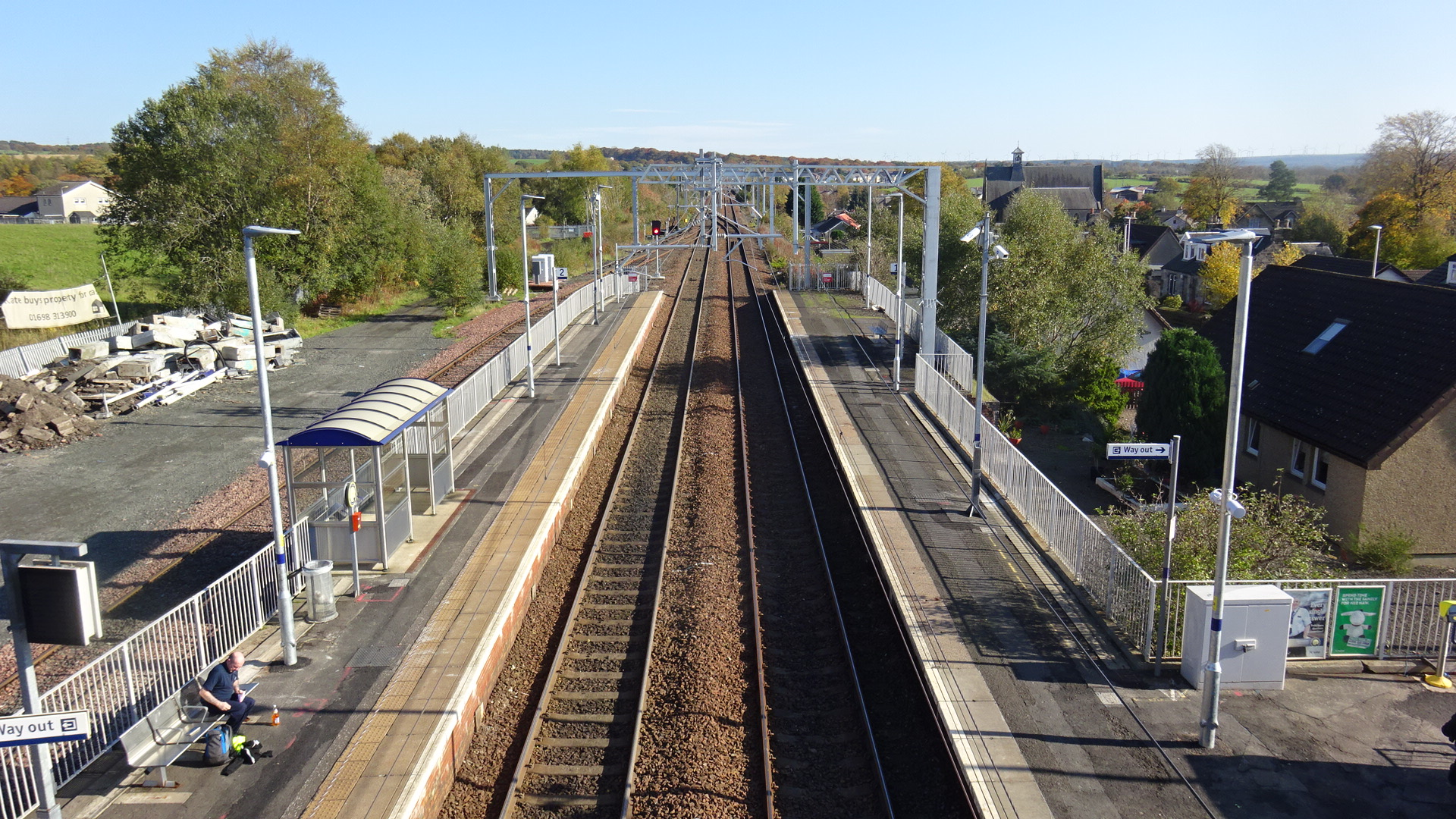
- Cleland railway station, looking east

General information
- Location: Cleland, North Lanarkshire; Scotland
- Coordinates: 55.8044°N 3.9107°W
- Grid reference: NS803584
- Managed by: ScotRail
- Transit authority: SPT
- Platforms: 2

Other information
- Station code: CEA

History
- Original company: Caledonian Railway
- Post-grouping: LMS

Key dates
- 9 July 1869: Opened as Bellside
- 1 October 1879: Renamed Omoa
- 1 October 1941: Renamed Cleland

Passengers
- 2020/21: ▼13,254
- 2021/22: ▲70,166
- 2022/23: ▲88,768
- 2023/24: ▲109,956
- 2024/25: ▼107,380
Location
Notes
- Passenger statistics from the Office of Rail and Road

Cleland railway station is a railway station serving the village of Cleland, near Motherwell in North Lanarkshire, Scotland. Built on the Cleland and Midcalder Line it was originally named 'Omoa', after the nearby ironworks, until Cleland (Old) on the Wishaw and Coltness Railway closed in 1930.

It is located on the Shotts Line, 15 3/4 miles (25.3 km) east of Glasgow Central towards Edinburgh Waverley via Shotts. The station has two platforms, connected by a stairway footbridge, and CCTV. It is managed by ScotRail.

== History ==
In 2019 the footbridge was replaced and lifts installed, allowing step-free access to both platforms.

== Services ==
It is currently served (Monday to Saturday) by one ScotRail service each hour between Glasgow Central and Edinburgh Waverley, plus one return service each day to/from Motherwell. On Sundays, there was normally no service prior to the December 2012 timetable change. However, in the four weeks leading up to Christmas an hourly service to Glasgow Central from Shotts via Whifflet is laid on for shoppers.

Cleland was not included in the timetable for the express passenger service along this line between Glasgow and Edinburgh.

However, from 9 December 2012 a new two-hourly Sunday service began operating between Glasgow Central and Edinburgh Waverley in both directions.

Preceding station	National Rail	Following station
Hartwood	ScotRail; Shotts Line	Carfin
	Historical railways	
Hartwood	Caledonian Railway; Cleland and Midcalder Line	Carfin

== Traction ==
The staple passenger traction on this line is now provided by Class 385 units with a small number of services operated by diesel powered Class 158 units.

Engineering works on other routes between Glasgow and Edinburgh may result in other diesel hauled passenger traction being seen, but these almost never call at this station.

Regular containerload and wagonload freight traffic also traverses the line regularly.

== Sources ==
- Butt, R. V. J. (October 1995). The Directory of Railway Stations: details every public and private passenger station, halt, platform and stopping place, past and present (1st ed.). Sparkford: Patrick Stephens Ltd. ISBN 978-1-85260-508-7. OCLC 60251199. OL 11956311M.
- Jowett, Alan (March 1989). Jowett's Railway Atlas of Great Britain and Ireland: From Pre-Grouping to the Present Day (1st ed.). Sparkford: Patrick Stephens Ltd. ISBN 978-1-85260-086-0. OCLC 22311137.
