= Fauldhouse railway station =

Railway station in West Lothian, Scotland

Fauldhouse
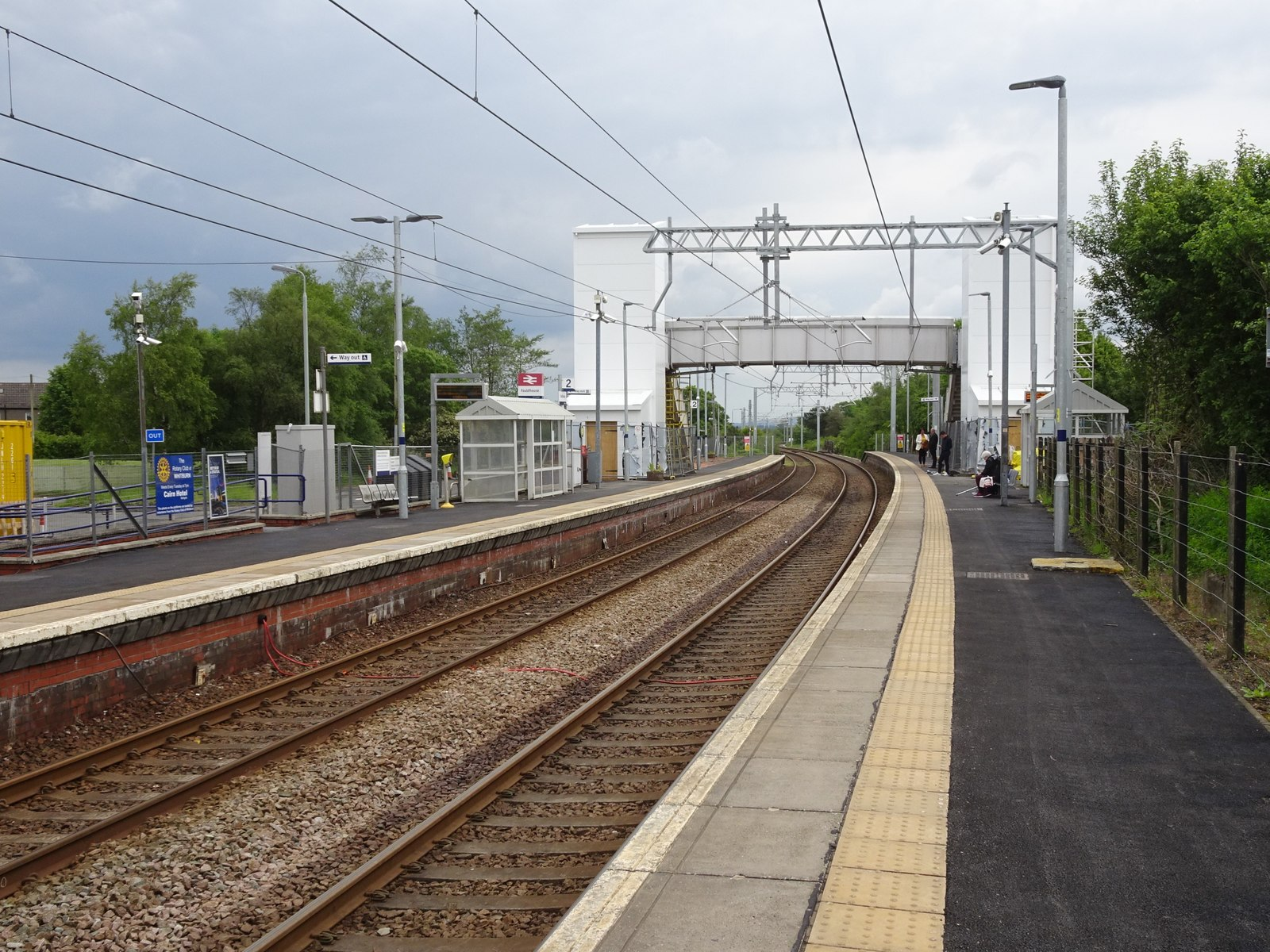
- Fauldhouse station in 2019, following electrification

General information
- Location: Fauldhouse, West Lothian; Scotland
- Coordinates: 55.8224°N 3.7192°W
- Grid reference: NS923601
- Manager: ScotRail
- Platforms: 2

Other information
- Station code: FLD

History
- Original company: Cleland and Midcalder Railway

Key dates
- 9 July 1869: Opened as Fauldhouse for Crofthead
- 1 June 1872: Renamed Fauldhouse
- 3 March 1952: Renamed Fauldhouse North
- 29 March 1986: Renamed

Passengers
- 2021/22: ▲25,232
- 2022/23: ▲32,740
- 2023/24: ▲42,016
- 2024/25: ▲46,148
- 2025/26: ▲50,666
Location
Notes
- Passenger statistics from the Office of Rail and Road

Fauldhouse railway station is a railway station serving Fauldhouse in West Lothian, Scotland. It is located on the Shotts Line, 23¼ miles (37 km) west of Edinburgh Waverley towards Glasgow Central.

The station is almost at the halfway point of the Shotts Line between Glasgow and Edinburgh. The station is located on the south-western edge of the village of Fauldhouse.

== Services ==
Monday to Saturday, there is generally an hourly service eastbound to Edinburgh Waverley and westbound towards Glasgow Central (less frequently in the late evening). There is also a single train each way to/from Motherwell (from there in the early morning, back in the evening).

There are no ticket collection or purchasing facilities at the station and it is unstaffed with limited car parking facilities.

Sundays see a 2-hourly service in both directions to Edinburgh and Glasgow.

== See also ==
- Fauldhouse and Crofthead railway station

== Sources ==
- Butt, R. V. J. (October 1995). The Directory of Railway Stations: details every public and private passenger station, halt, platform and stopping place, past and present (1st ed.). Sparkford: Patrick Stephens Ltd. ISBN 978-1-85260-508-7. OCLC 60251199. OL 11956311M.

Preceding station	National Rail	Following station
Breich	ScotRail; Shotts Line	Shotts
