= Curriehill railway station =

Railway station in Edinburgh, Scotland

Curriehill Scottish Gaelic: Cnoc Churraich
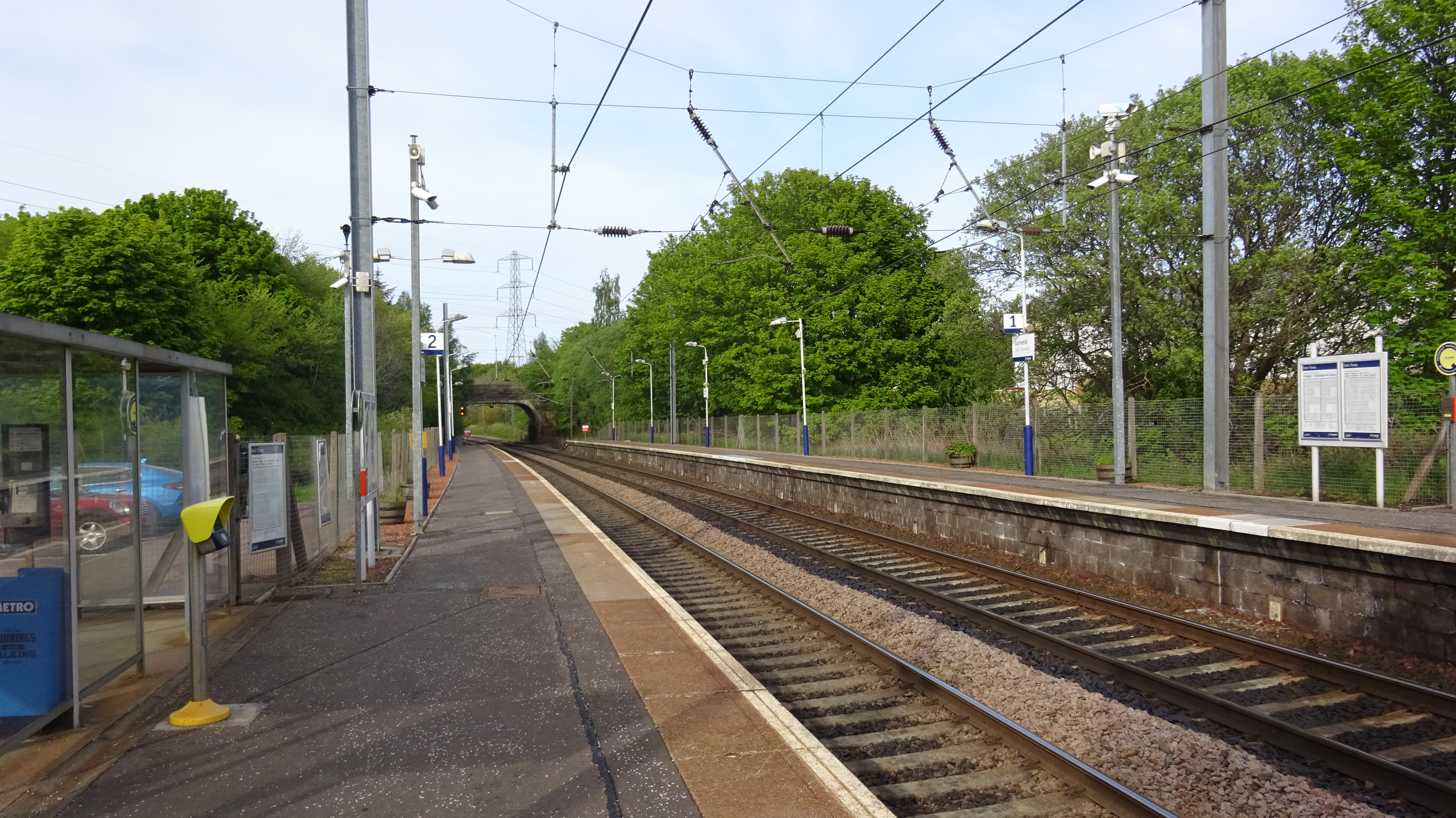

General information
- Location: Currie, Edinburgh; Scotland
- Coordinates: 55.9006°N 3.3185°W
- Grid reference: NT176682
- Managed by: ScotRail
- Platforms: 2

Other information
- Station code: CUH

Key dates
- 15 February 1848: Station opened
- 31 March 1951: Station closed
- 5 October 1987: Station reopened

Passengers
- 2020/21: ▼8,972
- 2021/22: ▲40,210
- 2022/23: ▲69,292
- 2023/24: ▲109,626
- 2024/25: ▲124,218
Location
Notes
- Passenger statistics from the Office of Rail and Road

Curriehill railway station is located in Currie, a southwestern suburb of the city of Edinburgh, Scotland, not far from the main campus of Heriot-Watt University. It lies on the Shotts Line, which runs from Glasgow Central to Edinburgh Waverley by way of Shotts.

The station has two platforms, connected by a stairway footbridge, and is equipped with CCTV. It is managed by ScotRail.

== History ==
Curriehill is a reopened station. The original Curriehill (called "Currie") opened on 15 February 1848, and was closed by British Railways on 31 March 1951. The present station (which occupies the site of the old station) opened on 5 October 1987.

== Services ==
Curriehill is currently served on Mondays to Saturdays by an approximately hourly ScotRail service in each direction, to Edinburgh Waverley and Glasgow Central. Most of these trains run via Shotts. Westbound trains via Carstairs only stop here during the evening. Two trains per day run to Motherwell (one in the evening peak running via Shotts and one late night service via Carstairs), whilst one starts back from there. On Sundays the service is more limited, with two-hourly departures each way after midday.

The staple passenger traction calling at this station is the Class 385, although the occasional Class 380 can also be seen. Avanti West Coast and TransPennine Express services pass through the station without stopping.

Preceding station	National Rail	Following station
Wester Hailes	ScotRail; Shotts Line	Kirknewton
