= Bellsquarry =

Coordinates: 55.871°N 3.517°W

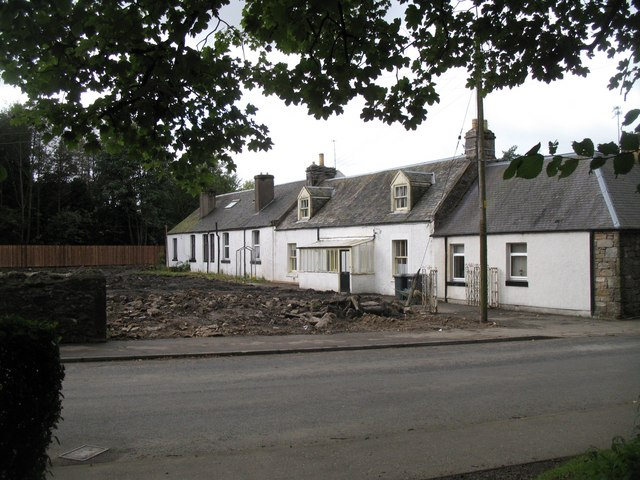
- Surviving houses from the era before Livingston

- Location within West Lothian
- OS grid reference: NT050652
- Civil parish: Mid Calder
- Council area: West Lothian
- Lieutenancy area: West Lothian
- Country: Scotland
- Sovereign state: United Kingdom
- Post town: LIVINGSTON
- Postcode district: EH54
- Dialling code: 01506
- Police: Scotland
- Fire: Scottish
- Ambulance: Scottish
- UK Parliament: Livingston
- Scottish Parliament: Almond Valley

Bellsquarry is a suburban area located in the south-west of Livingston, West Lothian, Scotland. Bellsquarry is located to the west of the Murieston area of the town and to the south of the Dedridge area of the town. The Brucefield industrial estate lies on its western edge.

== History ==
Along with the settlements of Livingston Village and Livingston Station (now Deans), Bellsquarry became part of Livingston new town on its designation in 1962.

The name Bellsquarry originates from a former Burdiehouse Limestone quarry and the surname of its owner, Mr Bell. The quarry was in operation by 1782 and continued until the early 20th century, when it was used as a rubbish dump before being tidied and covered. Some of the former limestone kilns still remain around throughout the area.

Brucefield Farm is a former substantial farmhouse built circa 1800 that is now in use as a restaurant.

== Buildings ==
As one of the older settlements in Livingston, there are several 19th and early 20th century buildings in Bellsquarry, including Bellsquarry Village Hall.

The Elm Tree Inn located at the village square, re-opened in early 2005 as a pub (downstairs) and restaurant (upstairs).

There is one primary school in Bellsquarry, constructed in 1909 by the architect James Graham Fairley. The school has its own adventure trail.

== Culture ==
There is a children's play park and several recreation fields in the centre of Bellsquarry. There is also a 17.75 ha (43.86 acres) wooded area known as Bellsquarry Wood, with ponds, and with trails connecting Bellsquarry to Murieston. Bellsquarry wood and the area to the south of the original village was once part of the estate of Newpark House. The house built in 1806 still survives, being incorporated in a series of new housing developments in the late 20th century. The original orchard exists as part of a new community orchard created in 2011.

== Transport ==
Bellsquarry is situated just south of the Edinburgh to Kilmarnock A71 road.

Newpark railway station was a railway station that served Bellsquarry on the Cleland and Midcalder Line between Edinburgh and Glasgow but it closed in 1959. Since then the nearest railway station to Bellsquarry is Livingston South railway station.
