= Breich =

Coordinates: 55.831°N 3.655°W

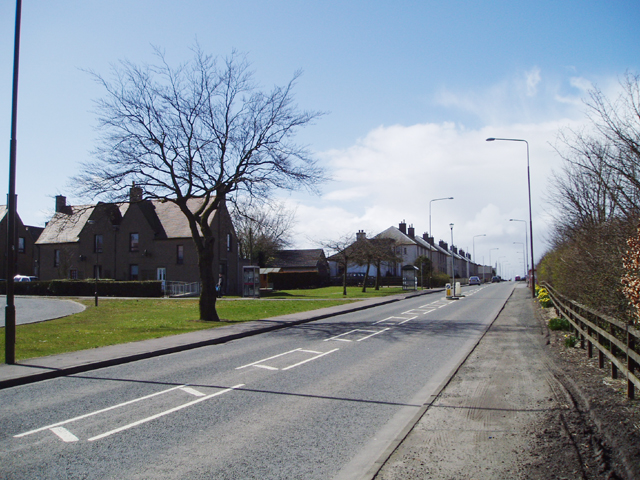
- The A71 through Breich

- Location within West Lothian
- Population: 209
- OS grid reference: NS963608
- Civil parish: West Calder
- Council area: West Lothian
- Country: Scotland
- Sovereign state: United Kingdom
- Post town: WEST CALDER
- Postcode district: EH55
- Dialling code: 01501
- Police: Scotland
- Fire: Scottish
- Ambulance: Scottish
- UK Parliament: Livingston
- Scottish Parliament: Almond Valley

Breich (/briːx/) is a small village lying in the western part of West Lothian, Scotland. It lies on the A71, the Edinburgh to Ayrshire road, which also goes to the large town of Livingston 7 miles to the east. It is situated at the junction of the A706, to Lanark, Bathgate and Linlithgow.

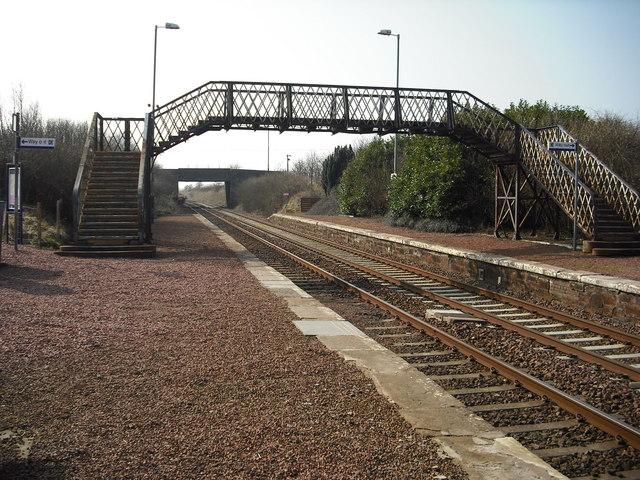
Breich railway station.

== Etymology ==
Breich is named after the nearby Breich Water. This name may be derived from Brittonic *brïch, meaning "variegated, mottled, speckled" (Welsh brych), or the early Gaelic cognate brecc. Derivation from Gaelic breac, meaning "trout", is possible, but the earliest form is Brech from 1199.

== Demography ==
According to a 2015 West Lothian report, Breich has a population of 209.

== Amenities and features ==
The village consists mainly of a single row of houses by the roadside, with some new builds behind the single row. Breich railway station is on the Shotts Line, until 2018 was served by one eastbound and one westbound train per day. Since then, the line has been electrified the station has been rebuilt and is served by an hourly train in each direction. A nearby coal bing (spoil heap) was used as a speedway training track in the late 1960s.

== Media ==
The Channel 4 TV comedy series Absolutely used Breich as a location for the fictional town of Stoneybridge, showing photographs of the houses by the roadside in a mock promotional video. It also used the nearby 'Five Sisters' spoil heap in the same scene.
