= Rutherglen railway station =

Railway station in South Lanarkshire, Scotland

Rutherglen Scottish Gaelic: An Ruadh-Ghleann
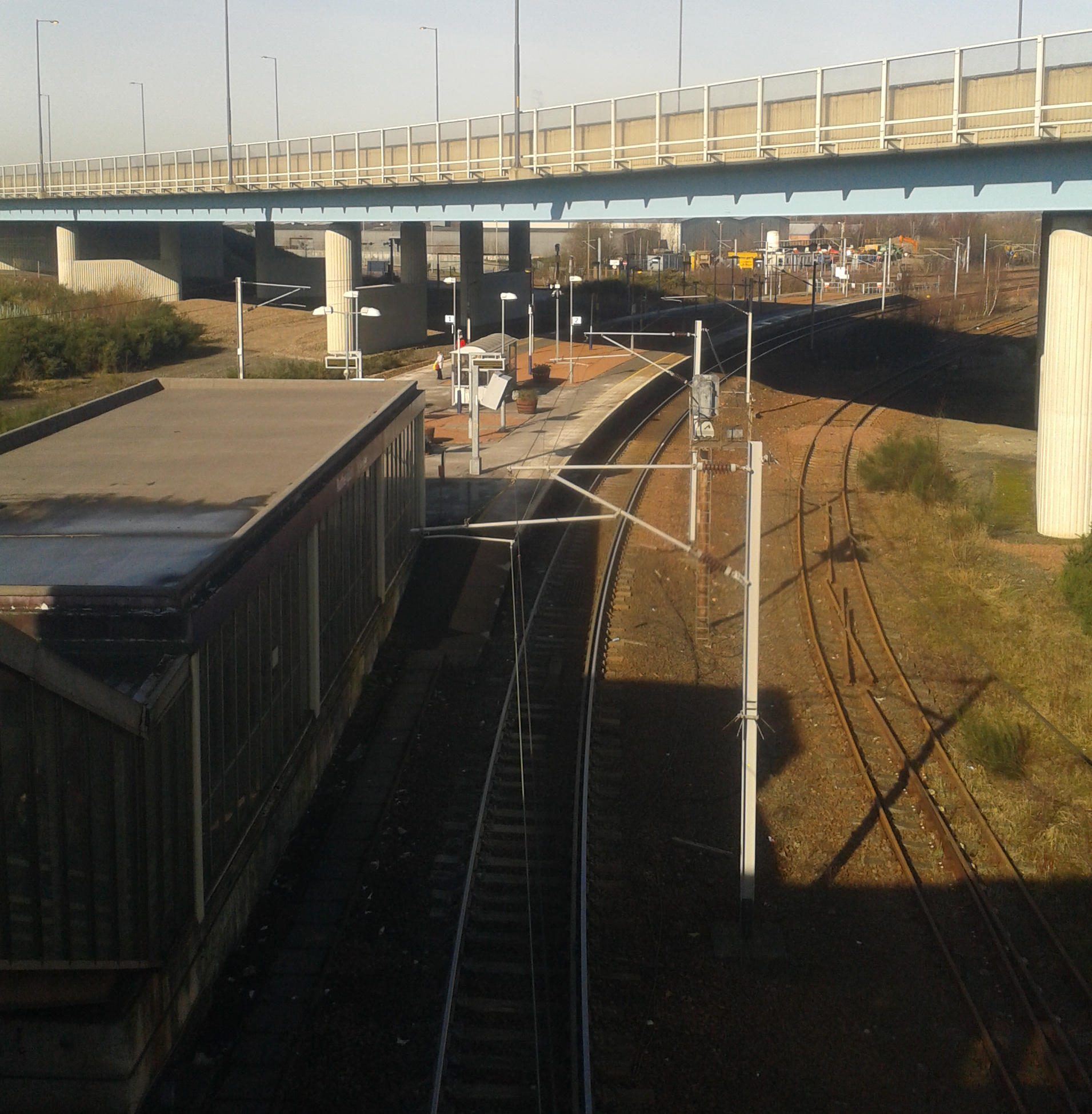
- Platform viewed from east walkway, February 2016

General information
- Location: Rutherglen, South Lanarkshire; Scotland
- Coordinates: 55°49′52″N 4°12′49″W
- Grid reference: NS615619
- Manager: ScotRail
- Transit authority: SPT
- Platforms: 2

Other information
- Station code: RUT

History
- Original company: Caledonian Railway
- Pre-grouping: Caledonian Railway
- Post-grouping: London Midland and Scottish Railway

Key dates
- 1 June 1849: Original station opened
- 31 March 1879: Original station closed; New station opened
- 5 October 1964: GCR platforms closed.
- 5 November 1979: Opening of the Argyle Line platforms; WCML slow line platforms closed.

Passengers
- 2021/22: ▲0.490 million
- 2022/23: ▲0.549 million
- 2023/24: ▲0.813 million
- 2024/25: ▲0.871 million
- 2025/26: ▲0.891 million
Location
Notes
- Passenger statistics from the Office of Rail and Road

Rutherglen railway station is in the town centre of Rutherglen, South Lanarkshire, Scotland, and lies on the Argyle Line. The station is served by a single island platform, connected to the street by a footbridge.

== History ==
=== Earlier stations ===
The first Rutherglen station was opened on the Caledonian Railway's line to Glasgow on 1 June 1849, or possibly 1842. The side platforms existed beneath today's footbridge at the base of the triangular junction. Serving about 70 passenger trains daily, it was replaced on 31 March 1879 by the second one stretching below the Farmeloan Road bridge. This, and subsequent stations, had both side platforms and island platforms. The third station served the west side and base of the triangle near the respective angle. The fourth station at the mid east side of the triangle complemented the third one. Despite the three rebuilds, access remained a concern.

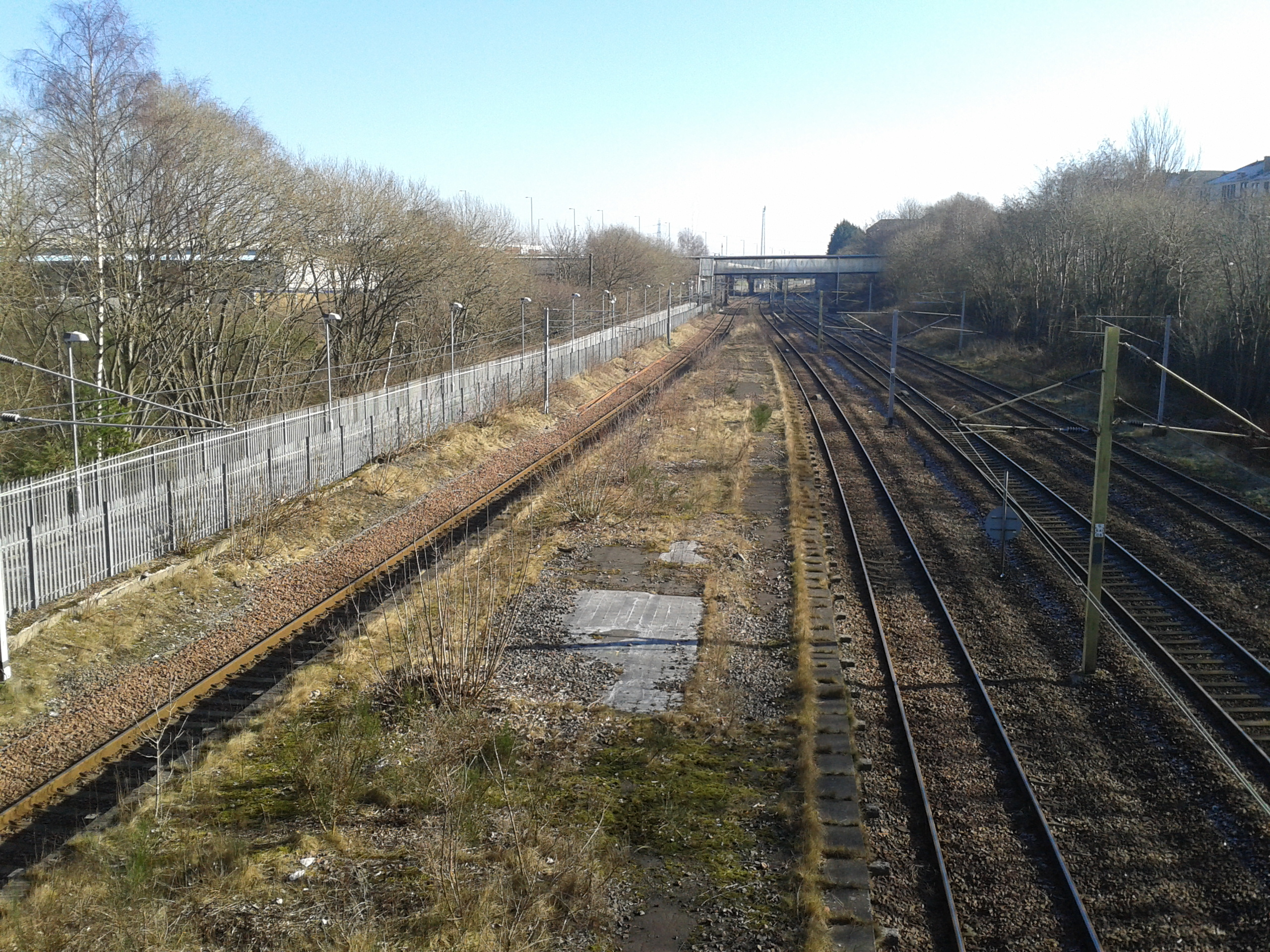
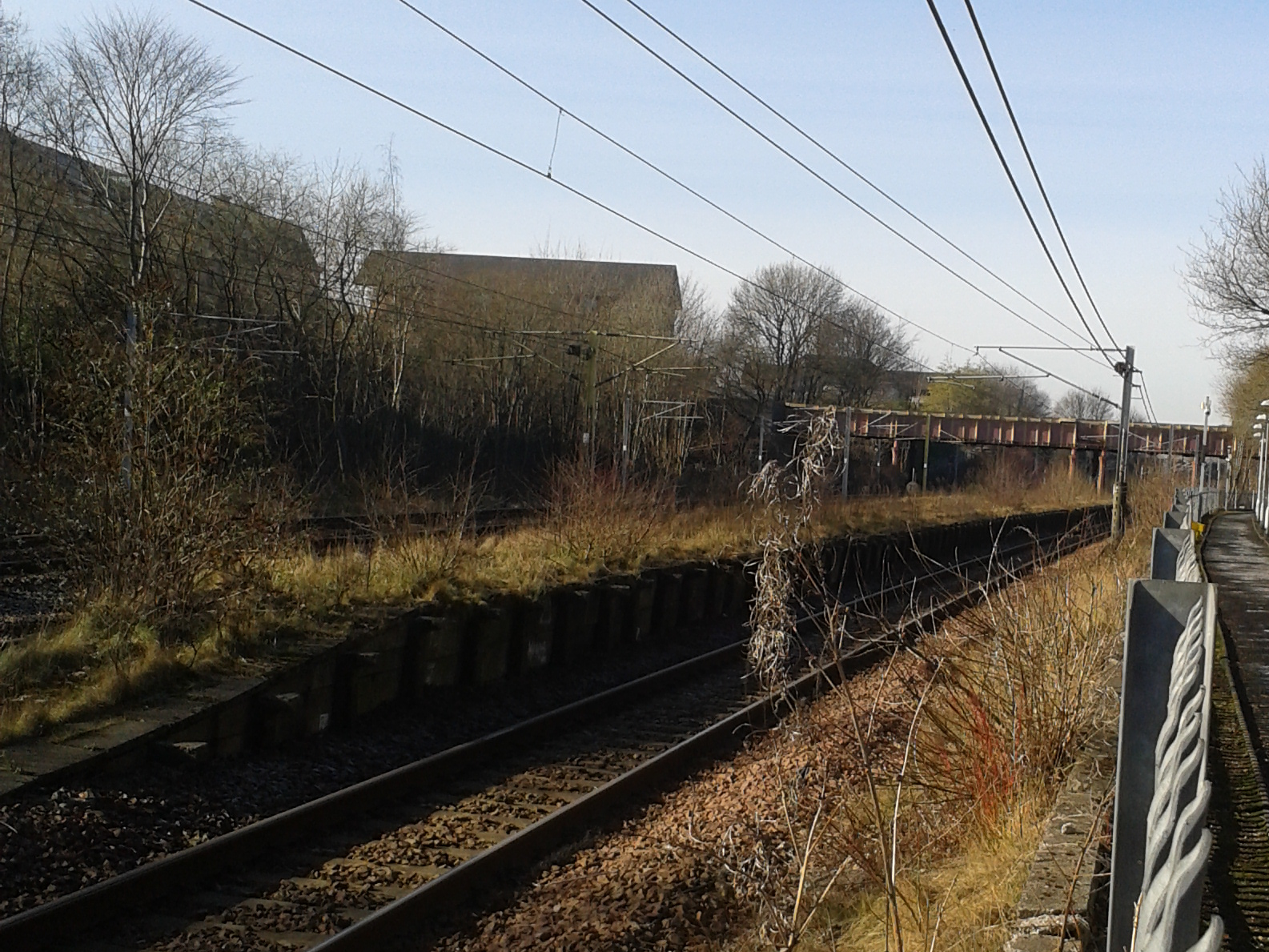
The remains of the old platform, beside the West Coast Main Line, February 2016.

Passenger services to London Road station, that began 1 April 1879, ceased when the Glasgow Central Railway underground commenced on 1 November 1895.

Services on the latter route were withdrawn as part of the Beeching Axe on 5 October 1964. Signal boxes have existed at the three angles. In 1973, a central control room in Glasgow replaced the final one at the apex.

On 6 May 1974, the West Coast Main Line (WCML) was opened to electrified services, which included Hamilton Circle services through the slow line island platform.

=== 1979 station ===
==== Routes ====
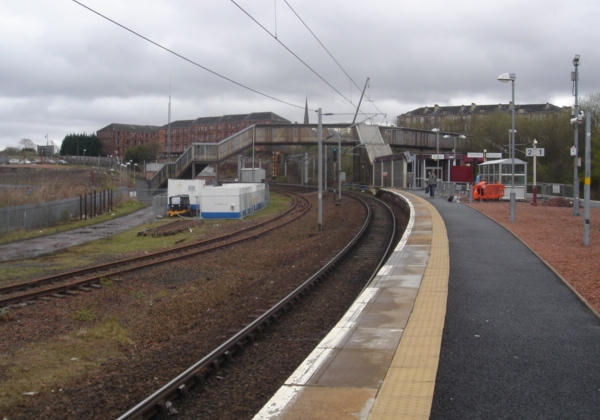
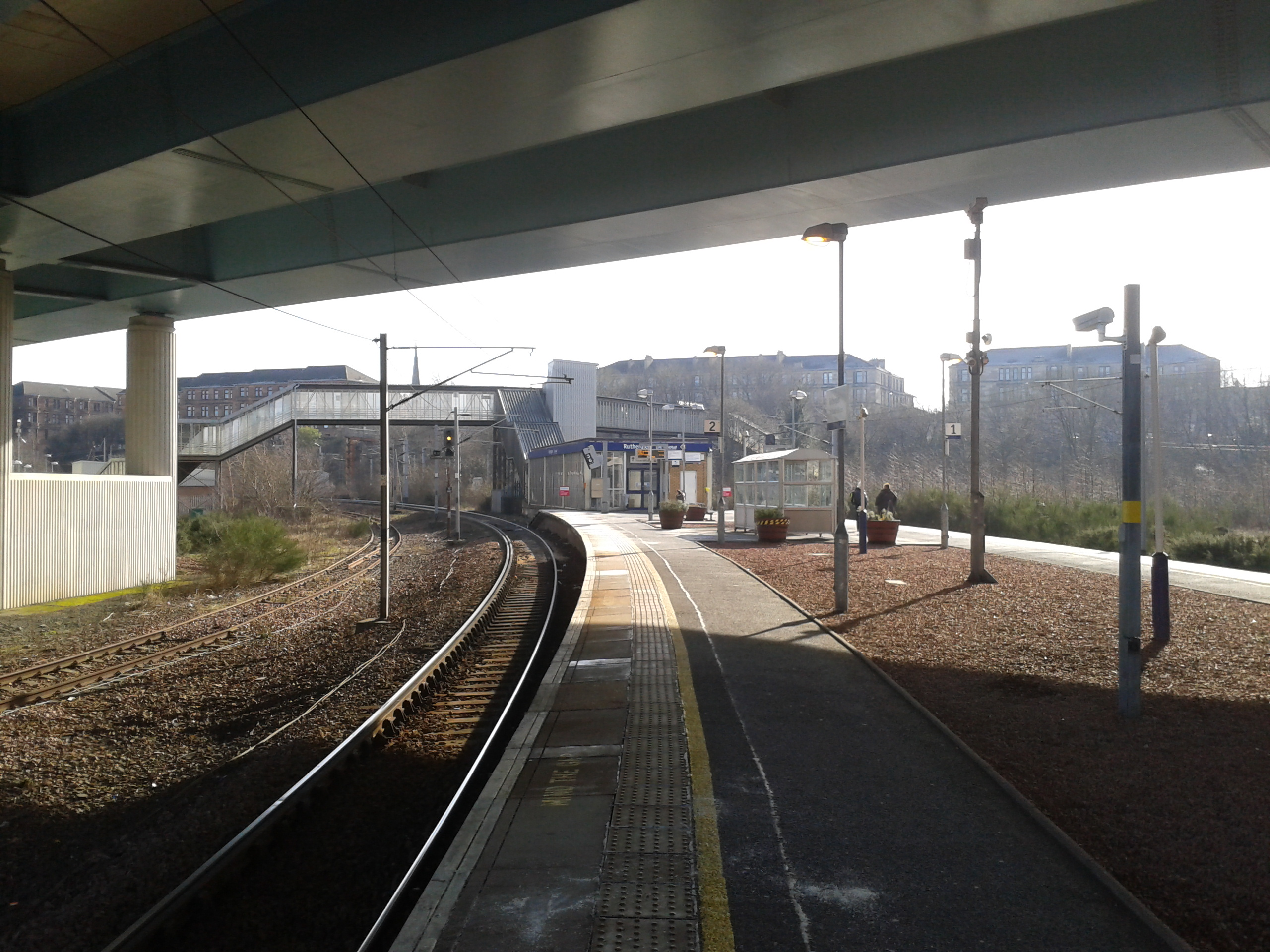
Southeastward view towards the WCML, April 2008, and after lift tower and M74 viaduct exist, February 2016.

No longer accessible to the public, but still visible, the former WCML island platform was closed when the new one opened in the vicinity of the fourth station on 5 November 1979 for Argyle Line services along the former route via Dalmarnock. Consequently, the DMU services on the Whifflet Line that terminated at Glasgow Central High Level bypassed the stop from 1979. When the Whifflet Line was electrified in December 2014, these trains were rerouted to the Argyle Line and the stop restored.

Eastwards, the Argyle Line formed a connection with the WCML and either diverged to the Whifflet Line, or continued on the WCML towards Cambuslang before continuing to the southern ends of the Argyle Line (Hamilton Circle, Cumbernauld or Larkhall). Since the 2014 electrification, passengers for stations to Motherwell and Lanark via Bellshill have changed at Cambuslang.

==== Passenger access ====
Access to the present platform is by a large (covered) footbridge from the Main Street, over the high-level railway to stairs down to the island platform and ticket office. To create a pram friendly and a disability-compliant option, the installation of a lift was completed in April 2009. The level crossing at the opposite end is restricted to staff accessing the nearby First Engineering Training Centre.

=== Accidents ===
1865: A train fatally struck a contractor's employee in the vicinity.

1867: A train ran over and killed a platelayer.

1869: In the Rutherglen tunnel about 150 yards (137 m) west of the then station, an eastbound passenger train ran into the rear of a coal train that was awaiting the line ahead to clear. Several passengers suffered serious injuries.

1876: An eastbound passenger train failed to observe a signal and crashed into the rear of a local passenger train at the station. Damage and injuries were minor.

1880: A westbound passenger express overran a signal and smashed into the rear of a local passenger train departing the station. Although the rolling stock sustained extensive damage, only one passenger suffered a serious injury. The engine driver's four-month sentence was commuted to two months. That year, a signalman, on stepping off the main line to avoid an approaching passenger train, sustained internal injuries on being struck by a coal train on the loop line.

1887: During dense fog, an eastbound passenger train collided with a stationary pilot engine 260 yards (238 m) east of the station. Believing the latter was on a siding, the signalman had given the passenger train a clear signal. Damage was significant and eight passengers sustained cuts and bruises.

1898: A porter seized a passenger, who was boarding a moving train. In attempting to drag him from the compartment, the man dropped between the train and platform. Run over by the wheels, the victim died within hours.

1901: An engine struck a track labourer. Months later, an express fatally struck an employee, who inattentively stepped from a goods van in the station vicinity.

1904: An engine fatally struck a brakeman.

1906: A fireman was crushed between a wagon and engine. Later that year, the wheels of a milk train crushed a porter's foot.

1907: A brakeman sustained a serious head injury when struck from behind by a train.

1930: During heavy fog, an eastbound passenger train smashed into the rear coach of another passenger train stopped at a signal about 100 yards (91 m) west of the station. Believing the first train had passed, the signalman had inadvertently set the signal to red. Twelve passengers suffered fractures or other serious injuries, and 65 minor injuries.

1931: An eastbound passenger train struck a passenger train being shunted about 300 yards (274 m) out of the station. Neither train carrying passengers, no injuries occurred, but one train was partially derailed and a carriage was badly damaged.

1936: Shortly before Rutherglen, a woman inexplicably fell from a westbound passenger train.

1938: An axle failure on a westbound passenger train caused a derailment where the final coach mounted the platform and landed on its side. The aftermath was one fatality and multiple serious injuries.

1940: Fatality, but details unspecified.

1944: Fatality, but details unspecified.

1975: A westbound cement train struck an eastbound passenger train, which was crossing from the slow to fast line on leaving the station. Only one passenger in the four derailed coaches sustained serious injuries.

1977: An express fatally struck a three-year-old boy who had wandered through a broken fence and fallen down an embankment onto the line.

== Services ==
Passenger trains per hour
Direction	Terminus	Via	Mon–Sat	Sun (10am–6pm)
Eastbound	Cumbernauld	Motherwell, Hamilton Central	1	
	Motherwell	Hamilton Central or Whifflet	2	3
	Larkhall	Hamilton Central	2	1
	Whifflet		1	
Westbound	Dalmuir	Yoker or Singer	2	
	Milngavie		2	2
	Balloch		2	2

Preceding station	National Rail	Following station
Cambuslang or Carmyle	ScotRail; Argyle Line	Dalmarnock
	Historical railways	
Terminus	Caledonian Railway; London Road branch	Bridgeton (original)
Terminus	Caledonian Railway; Glasgow Central Railway	Dalmarnock; Line and station open
Cambuslang; Line and station open	Caledonian Railway; Clydesdale Junction Railway	Terminus
Terminus	Caledonian Railway; Polloc and Govan Railway and others	Glasgow Central (High Level); Line and station open
