= West Calder railway station =

Railway station in West Lothian, Scotland

West Calder Scottish Gaelic: Caladar an Iar
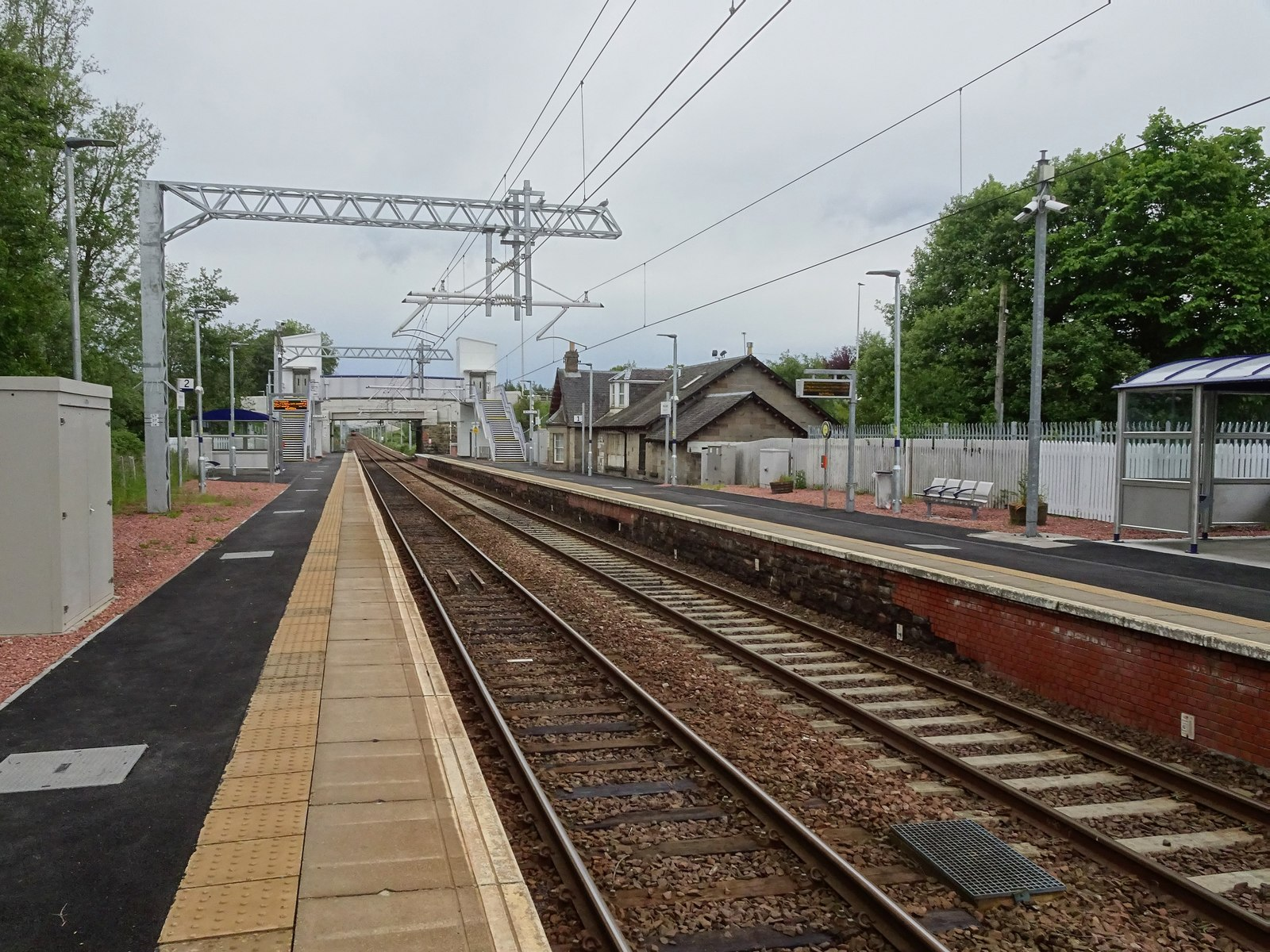
- West Calder station in 2019, following electrification

General information
- Location: West Calder, West Lothian; Scotland
- Coordinates: 55.8537°N 3.5671°W
- Grid reference: NT019633
- Managed by: ScotRail
- Platforms: 2

Other information
- Station code: WCL

Key dates
- 9 July 1869: Opened

Passengers
- 2020/21: ▼19,716
- 2021/22: ▲68,540
- 2022/23: ▲90,460
- 2023/24: ▲0.128 million
- 2024/25: ▲0.140 million

Listed Building – Category B
- Designated: 3 May 1988
- Reference no.: LB19677
Location
Notes
- Passenger statistics from the Office of Rail and Road

West Calder railway station is a railway station serving the village of West Calder in West Lothian, Scotland. It is located on the Shotts Line, 17 miles (28 km) west of Edinburgh Waverley on the way to Glasgow Central. The station has two platforms, connected by a stairway footbridge, and CCTV. It is managed by ScotRail. In 2018, accessibility improvements at the station saw the installation of a new footbridge and lifts while the original cast iron footbridge was dismantled and removed to the heritage Bo'ness and Kinneil Railway. Pedestrian ingress onto and egress from either platform, without using stairs or lifts, is possible via tarmac ramp connecting to the pavement of a traffic bridge.

== Services ==
Since the December 2009 timetable change, the station is currently served, Monday to Saturday, by one ScotRail all-stops service each hour between Glasgow Central and Edinburgh Waverley. There is also a semi-fast service between the two cities each hour which calls (this otherwise stops only at Haymarket, Livingston South, Shotts and Bellshill). One train a day from Edinburgh terminates at Motherwell and one starts back from there in the opposite direction.

The timetable featured a limited Sunday service of one train every two hours from this station to Edinburgh until December 2012; at the timetable change that year a two-hourly Sunday service between Glasgow Central and Edinburgh Waverley was introduced which remains in operation as of May 2016.

As of April 2019, the passenger traction on this line is the Class 380 and Class 385 (previously Class 156 and Class 158).

Preceding station	National Rail	Following station
Livingston South	ScotRail; Shotts Line	Addiewell or Shotts
