= John Hanlon (footballer) =

Scottish footballer (1892–1976)

Personal information
- Date of birth: 1892
- Place of birth: Addiewell, Scotland
- Date of death: 1976 (aged 83–84)
- Place of death: West Calder, Scotland
- Height: 5 ft 7 in (1.70 m)
- Position: Outside right

Senior career*
Years	Team	Apps	(Gls)
–	Fauldhouse West End		
1913–1916	Hamilton Academical	88	(11)
1916–1919	Heart of Midlothian	1	(0)
1919–1922	Hamilton Academical	96	(15)
1922–1926	Heart of Midlothian	18	(2)
1924	→ Bathgate (loan)	6	(1)
1925–1926	→ Alloa Athletic (loan)	5	(0)
1926–1927	Peebles Rovers		
1928–1929	Stoneyburn		
Total		214	(28)
- * Club domestic league appearances and goals

John Hanlon (1892–1976) was a Scottish footballer who played as an outside right.

== Early life ==
John Hanlon was born in 1892 in Addiewell, West Calder, Scotland to Irish parents, George Hanlon and Ellen/Helen McCrossan of County Donegal.

== Career ==
Hanlon played primarily for Hamilton Academical – he signed for the Accies as a teenager in 1913 a week after being selected for Scotland at junior level, featuring regularly for much of that time.

He moved to Heart of Midlothian in 1916 but only played in one Scottish Football League match during his initial three years at Tynecastle Park and was away from the club for much of the time serving in World War I.

He returned to Hamilton in late 1919 (and was a Lanarkshire Cup winner in 1920) then signed for Hearts again in 1922, but failed to become established there, serving lower-division loans at Bathgate and Alloa Athletic.

== Outside football ==
Hanlon was a noted athlete (often competing under the pseudonym 'Harris'), his speciality being middle-distance running and particularly the half mile, recording a 1min 55sec time in a meeting at Shawfield Stadium in 1922. He won multiple track events with his regiment (Royal Scots) in a post-war Rhine Army Sports Championship in 1919; during the conflict itself, he was employed as a dispatch runner.
