= Coal oil =

Oil derived from coal

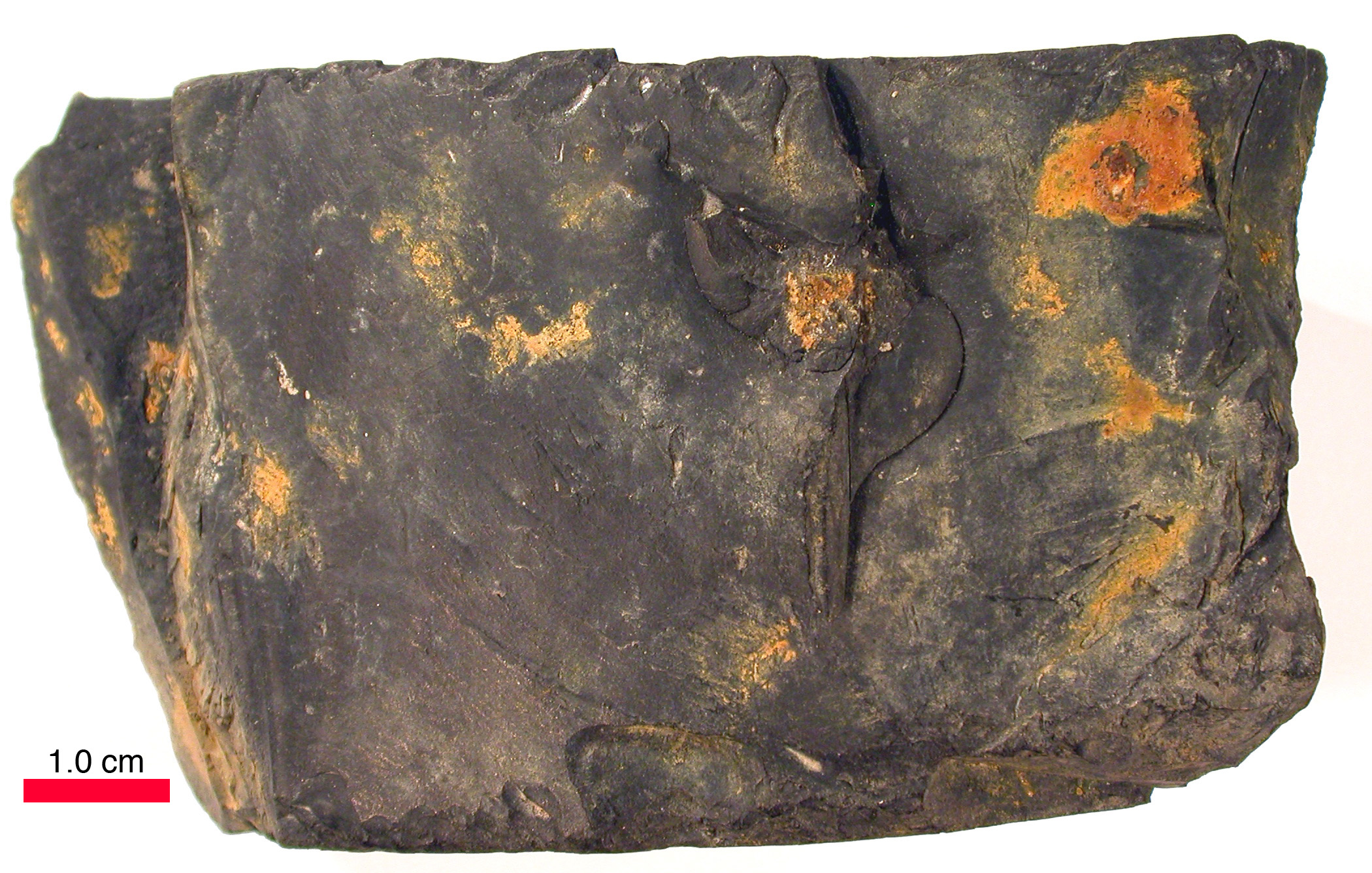
Cannel coal of the Pennsylvanian subperiod from NE Ohio used to produce coal oil

Coal oil is a shale oil obtained from the destructive distillation of cannel coal, mineral wax, or bituminous shale, once used widely for illumination.

Chemically similar to the more refined, petroleum-derived kerosene, it consists mainly of several hydrocarbons of the alkane series, with 10 to 16 carbon atoms in each molecule, with a boiling point of 175 to 325 °C (347 to 617 °F), higher than gasoline or the petroleum ethers, and lower than the oils.

Because kerosene was first derived from cannel coal, classified as terrestrial type of oil shale, it continued to be popularly referred to as "coal oil" even after production shifted to petroleum as a feedstock. Refined hydrocarbons of the alkane series with 10 to 16 carbon atoms are the same thing whether taken from coal or petroleum.

== History ==
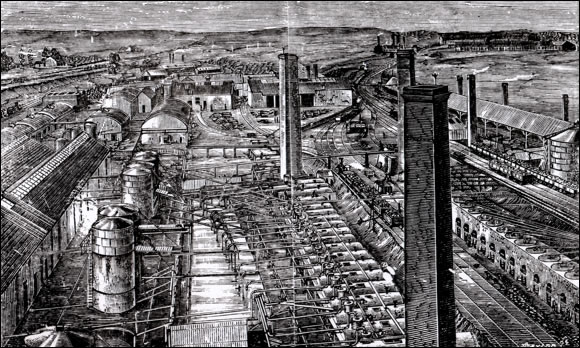
James Young's Addiewell Works in West Lothian

The term was in use by the late 18th century for oil produced as a by-product of the production of coal gas and coal tar. In the early 19th century, it was discovered that coal oil distilled from cannel coal could be used in lamps as an illuminant, although the early coal oil burned with a smokey flame, so that it was used only for outdoor lamps; cleaner-burning whale oil was used in indoor lamps.

Coal oil that burned cleanly enough to compete with whale oil as an indoor illuminant was first produced in 1850 on the Union Canal in Scotland by James Young, who patented the process. Production thrived in Scotland, making Young a very wealthy man.

In Addiewell, West Lothian, Young built a substantial industrial complex for separating petroleum from various oil shales, including cannel coal. In its time it was one of the largest chemical works in Scotland. Construction began in 1866. Addiewell remained the centre of operations for Young's Paraffin Light and Mineral Oil Co. Ltd., but as local supplies of bituminous shale became exhausted, activities were increasingly focussed on other shale-fields. The refinery closed around 1921.

In the United States, coal oil was widely manufactured in the 1850s under the trade name Kerosene, manufactured by a process invented by Canadian geologist Abraham Gesner. Young won his patent lawsuit against the Gesner process in the United States in 1860. But by that time, US coal oil distillers were switching over to refining cheaper petroleum, after the discovery of abundant petroleum in western Pennsylvania in 1859, and oil from coal operations ceased in the US.

== Uses ==
=== Lighting ===
Coal oil was used to provide lighting.

=== Medicinal use ===
Coal oil was once used as an internal and topical home remedy as a general cure-all for many ailments, including coughs, flu, cuts, abrasions, and wounds. Internal applications were administered by adding the toxic petroleum product to sugar cubes, molasses, honey or some other substance to mask the taste, while topical applications were applied by adding it to bandages or by pouring the coal oil directly on the affected area.

"Pale sulfonated shale oil" (PSSO), a sulfonated and ammonia neutralized variant named "Ichthammol" (chemical: Ammonium bituminosulfonate) is still in application today.

=== Culinary use of the term ===
The term "coal oil" is sometimes used in the context of food; it is not mineral coal oil as discussed in this article, but edible vegetable oil infused with wood-derived charcoal for flavour.

== See also ==
- Coal tar
- Patent medicine
- Abraham Pineo Gesner, produced kerosene from coal, 1846
- Shale oil extraction
