= Cambuslang railway station =

Railway station in South Lanarkshire, Scotland

Cambuslang Scottish Gaelic: Camas Lang
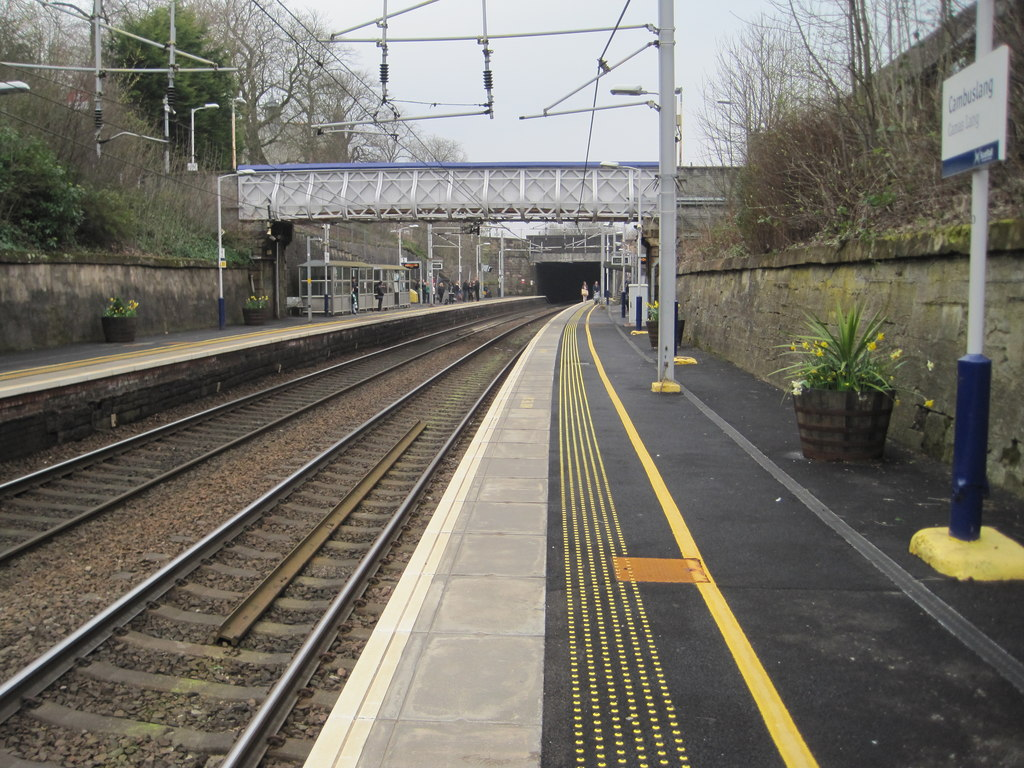
- Cambuslang railway station, looking north towards Rutherglen and Glasgow Central in 2014.

General information
- Location: Cambuslang, South Lanarkshire; Scotland
- Coordinates: 55.8195°N 4.1731°W
- Grid reference: NS639606
- Manager: ScotRail
- Transit authority: SPT
- Platforms: 2

Other information
- Station code: CBL

Key dates
- 1 June 1849: Station opened

Passengers
- 2021/22: ▲0.443 million
- Interchange: ▲25,888
- 2022/23: ▲0.629 million
- Interchange: ▲31,582
- 2023/24: ▲0.767 million
- Interchange: ▲42,517
- 2024/25: ▲0.831 million
- Interchange: ▲54,701
- 2025/26: ▲0.873 million
- Interchange: ▲58,135
Location
Notes
- Passenger statistics from the Office of Rail and Road

Cambuslang railway station is a railway station which serves the town of Cambuslang, South Lanarkshire, Scotland. The station is 5 miles (8 km) south east of Glasgow Central, and is physically located on the West Coast Main Line (WCML) although main line services do not stop here - it is served by local stopping services as part of the Argyle Line to and from Glasgow Central (both Low & High Level). Passenger services are provided by ScotRail on behalf of Strathclyde Partnership for Transport (SPT).

== History ==
The station was planned as part of the Clydesdale Junction Railway, opening on 1 June 1849 between Motherwell and Rutherglen along what had become part of the Caledonian Main Line which eventually became absorbed into the WCML route to London. In 1974, the WCML electrification was completed by British Rail allowing local stopping services through the station on the Hamilton Circle and Lanark routes to be operated by electric trains using BR Class 303 and 311 "Blue Trains".

The station originally had two large station buildings on each platform, leading directly up to the Main Street; these were later demolished, and one building has been built on the street containing the ticket office and timetable posters.

== Geography ==
The platforms of Cambuslang station are located in a cutting between North Avenue and Cambuslang Main Street (the A724, at its junction with the southern end of the short A763). The station falls within the G72 postcode area; the main entrance is on Main Street. There is also a secondary (non-wheelchair accessible) entrance from North Avenue. The station is approximately 5 minutes' walk from the nearby Morrisons supermarket. There are SPT bus stances directly outside on Main Street, served by First Bus and Henderson Travel services towards Rutherglen, Glasgow's Buchanan Bus Station and to Parkhead Forge, and towards Halfway, Blantyre and Hamilton in the opposite direction. In 2021, a 256-space Park and Ride facility was opened on Bridge Street, about 2 to 3 minutes' walking distance to the north.

== Operations ==
=== Platform 1 – Westbound ===
Westbound services travel towards Glasgow Central. Shotts Line services terminate at the High Level platforms, as did the Hamilton Circle services prior to the opening of the Argyle Line in November 1979. From November 1979, British Rail electric services proceeded through the Low Level platforms, to the North Clyde Line, terminating at Milngavie, Dalmuir (via Yoker or Singer). When the Argyle Line first opened in 1979, trains also terminated at Dumbarton Central.

A further recast of the timetable in December 2014 means that services from Lanark now run to High Level and passengers from this direction wishing to reach Argyle Line destinations must change trains here. Services on the Argyle Line now run to Dalmuir via Yoker and to Milngavie.

=== Platform 2 – Eastbound ===
Eastbound services travel from Glasgow Central. Trains on the Shotts Line proceed through to Edinburgh Waverley, but only call during the peaks and late evenings. Electric trains travel round the Hamilton Circle in an anti-clockwise direction to Motherwell/Cumbernauld or Larkhall and to Lanark (express; via Bellshill and Shieldmuir).

== Services ==
=== 1979 service patterns ===
Eastbound

- 2 tph from Dalmuir to Motherwell via Hamilton
- 1 tph from Dumbarton Central to Motherwell via Hamilton
- 2 tph from Dalmuir to Motherwell via Bellshill
- 1 tph from Dumbarton Central to Motherwell via Bellshill
- 1 tph from Milngavie to Lanark (express service between Glasgow Central and Motherwell)

Westbound

- 2 tph from Motherwell via Hamilton to Dalmuir
- 1 tph from Motherwell via Hamilton to Dumbarton Central
- 2 tph from Motherwell via Bellshill to Dalmuir
- 1 tph from Motherwell via Bellshill to Dumbarton Central
- 1 tph from Lanark to Milngavie (express service between Motherwell and Glasgow Central)

=== Current service patterns ===
Monday - Saturday

Eastbound

- 2tph to Larkhall via Hamilton
- 1tph to Motherwell via Hamilton
- 1tph to Cumbernauld via Hamilton & Motherwell
- 2tph to Lanark via Bellshill & Motherwell

There are services to Edinburgh Waverley via Shotts from Glasgow Central calling here 3 times a day.

Westbound

- 4tph to Dalmuir (either via Yoker or via Singer)
- 2tph to Glasgow Central High Level
- 2tph to Milngavie (Half the services to Dalmuir go to Milngavie in the evening.)

There are services to Glasgow Central from Edinburgh Waverley via Shotts calling here 5 times a day.

Sunday

Eastbound

- 1tph to Motherwell via Bellshill
- 2tph to Motherwell via Hamilton
- 1tph to Lanark via Bellshill & Motherwell
- 1tph to Larkhall via Hamilton

No services to Edinburgh Waverley call here.

Westbound

- 1tph to Balloch via Yoker
- 2tph to Glasgow Central High Level
- 2tph to Milngavie

No services from Edinburgh Waverley via Shotts to Glasgow Central calling here.

| Preceding station | National Rail | Following station |
|---|---|---|
| Uddingston | ScotRail; Shotts Line (limited service) | Glasgow Central |
| Newton | ScotRail; Argyle Line | Rutherglen |
| | Historical railways | |
| Newton; Line and station open | Caledonian Railway; Clydesdale Junction Railway | Rutherglen; Line and station open |

== Station facilities ==
Cambuslang is covered by CCTV and is completely accessible by wheelchair from the Main Street entrance. Timetables are posted on the footbridge and staff are on hand to assist passengers; real-time service information is provided by passenger information screens on the platforms. The footbridge is at street-level, and its metal sides rise to above average head-height, rendering the railway tracks invisible to anyone crossing. Access from the footbridge to platforms is via broad ramps. A ticket vending machine and new waiting shelters were recently installed on the westbound platform.
