= Shotts Line =

Railway line in Scotland

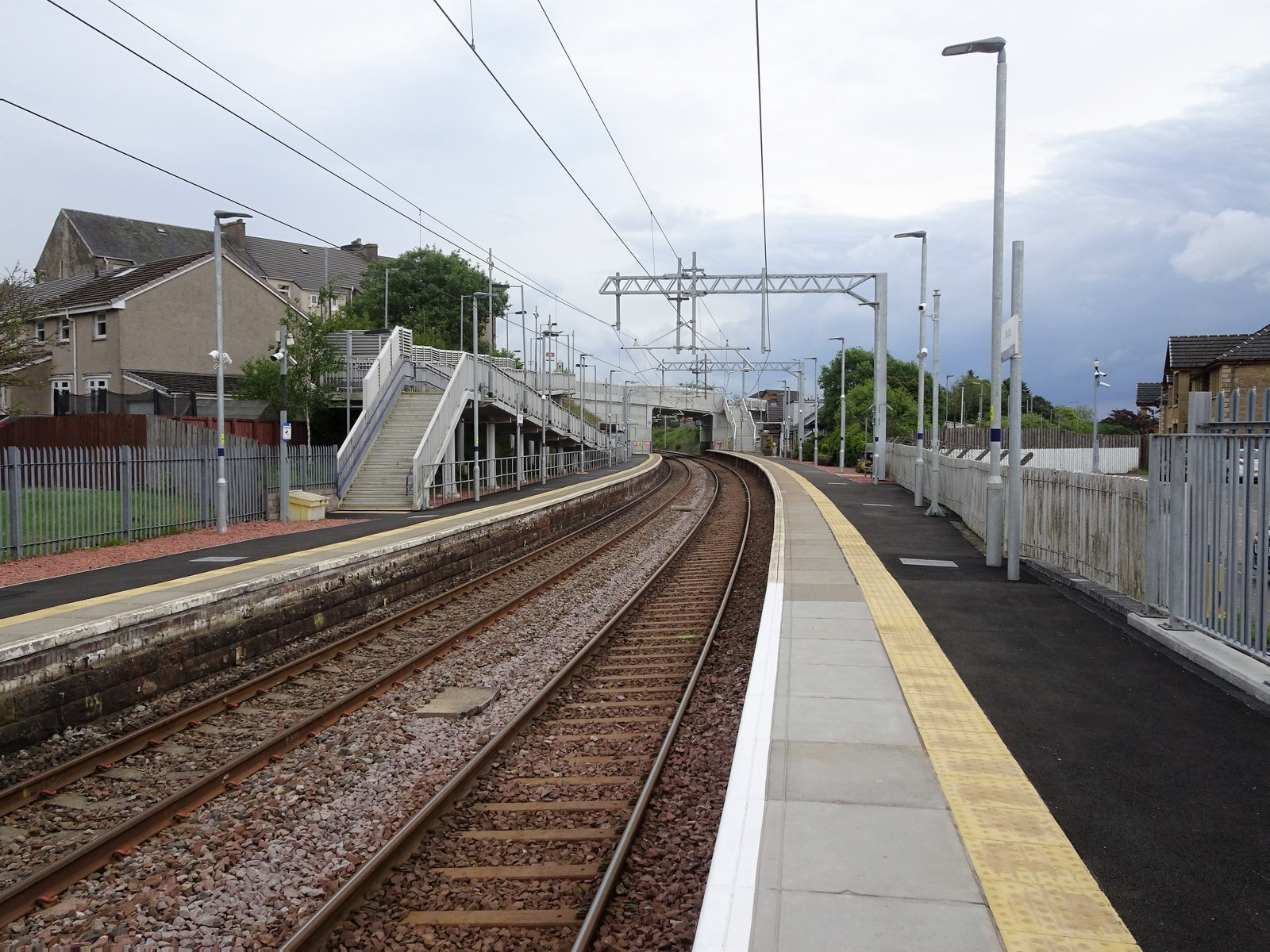
- Shotts railway station following electrification

Overview
- Owner: Network Rail
- Locale: Glasgow; South Lanarkshire; North Lanarkshire; West Lothian Edinburgh; Scotland
- Termini: Glasgow Central; Edinburgh Waverley

Service
- System: National Rail
- Operators: ScotRail; CrossCountry services pass but do not stop at intermediate stations
- Rolling stock: Class 158; Class 385

Technical
- Track gauge: 1,435 mm (4 ft 8 1/2 in)
- Electrification: 25 kV 50 Hz AC OHLE
Route map
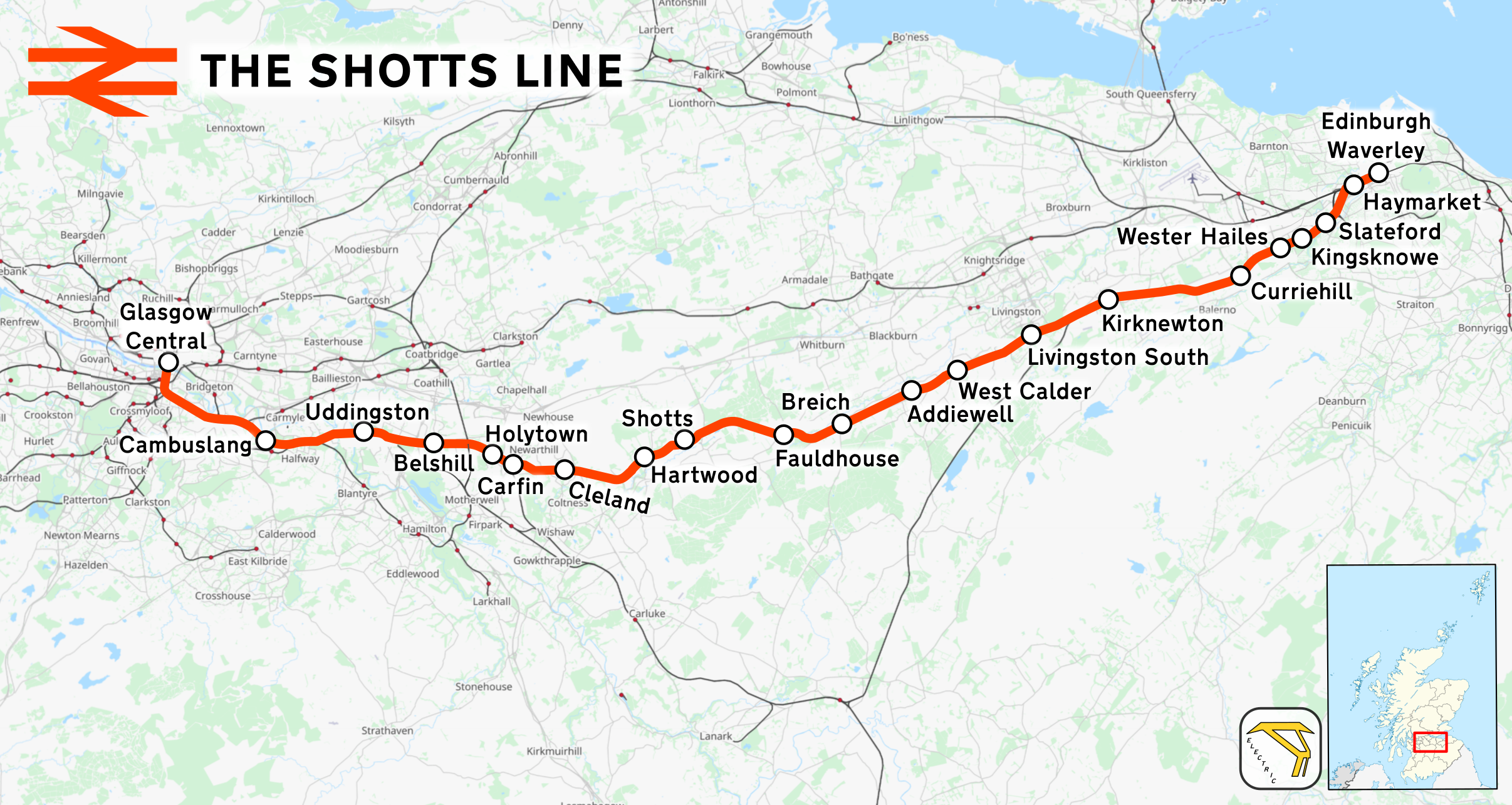
(Click to expand)

The Shotts Line is a suburban railway line in Scotland linking Glasgow Central and Edinburgh Waverley via Shotts. It is one of the four rail links between the two cities.

Between Glasgow Central and Uddingston, the line is shared with the West Coast Main Line (WCML), before branching off towards Bellshill, rejoining the Edinburgh branch of the WCML at Midcalder Junction. The line's electrification was completed in early April 2019.

== Glasgow to Edinburgh services ==
The Shotts line does not carry the principal service between the cities, with the fast service on the Shotts taking at least 15 minutes longer compared to the faster and more frequent Glasgow Queen Street-Edinburgh service via Falkirk, which is the principal commuter link between the two cities.

== History of route ==
The majority of the route follows ex-Caledonian Railway metals, with the North British Railway at the Edinburgh end.

- Glasgow Central Lines (CR)
- Polloc and Govan Railway between Eglinton Street Tunnels and Rutherglen (CR)
- Clydesdale Junction Railway between Rutherglen and Uddingston (CR)
- Cleland and Midcalder Line between Uddingston and Kirknewton (CR)
- Caledonian Railway Main Line between Kirknewton and Haymarket
- Edinburgh and Glasgow Railway between Haymarket and Edinburgh Waverley (NBR)

The line was threatened with closure in the Beeching Report of 1963, but was reprieved. Services were diverted from their original terminus at Edinburgh Princes Street to Haymarket and Edinburgh Waverley when Princes Street closed in September 1965.

The route from Glasgow to Shotts was part of the Strathclyde Partnership for Transport network until it was taken over by First ScotRail.

== Transport studies ==
In 2002, the Scottish Association Public Transport (SAPT) published a report suggesting that electrification of the Shotts Line would open up the Glasgow suburban electric network to Edinburgh and beyond, principally linking the capital to the Glasgow Airport Rail Link (now cancelled). This has been proposed as an alternative to the Crossrail Glasgow scheme, since it would not depend on the heavily used North Clyde Line, and would also provide a more direct electric link between Edinburgh and Glasgow without using the longer route via the WCML through Carstairs Junction.

== Stations ==
The Shotts line serves the following stations:

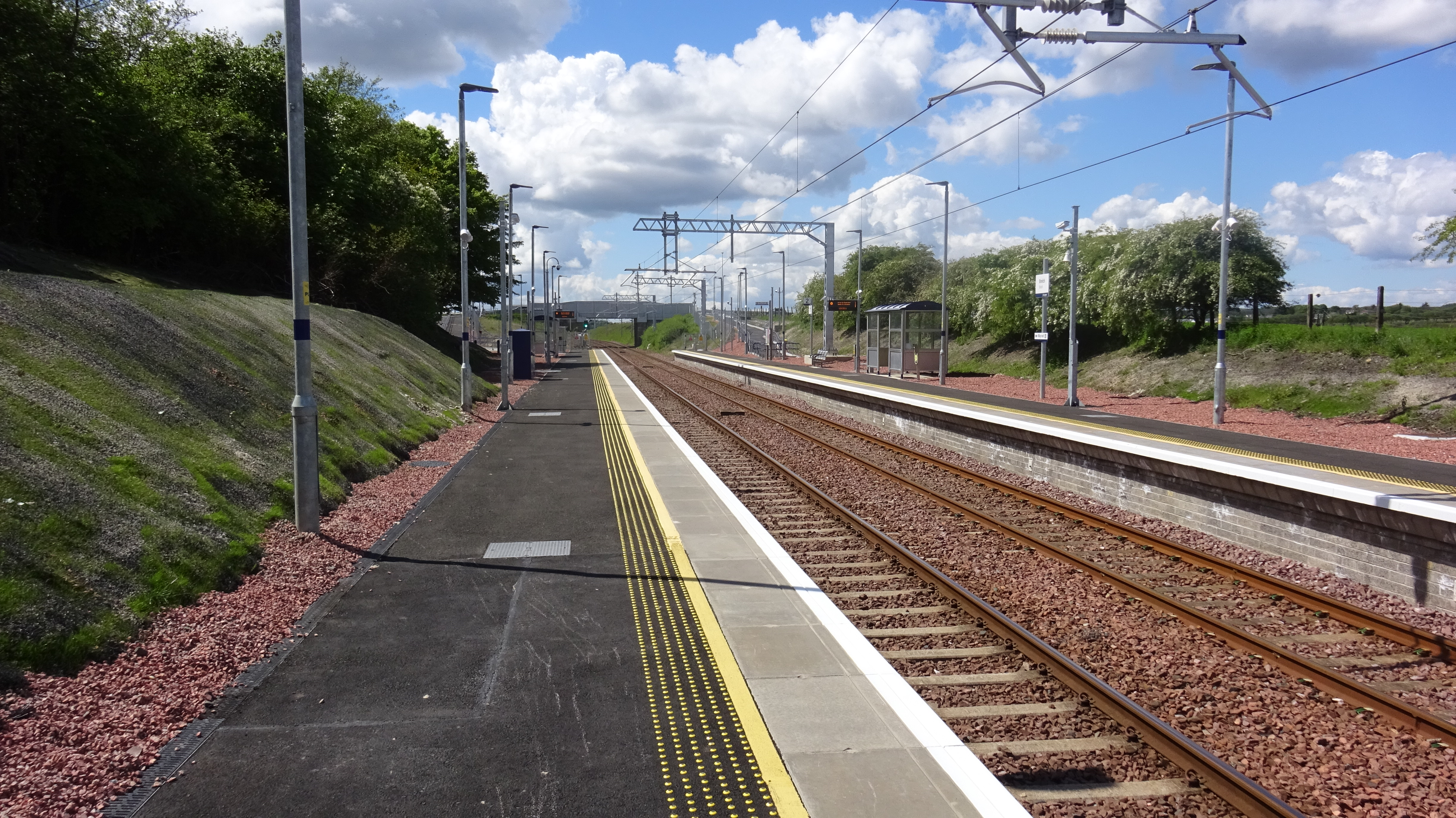
Breich railway station

- Glasgow Central
  - connections for south-west Scotland, including Ayr, Greenock and Dumfries as well as West Coast Main Line services
- Cambuslang
  - only at peak times
- Uddingston
- Bellshill
  - connections to Motherwell and Lanark.
- Holytown
- Carfin
- Cleland
- Hartwood
- Shotts
- Fauldhouse
- Breich
- Addiewell
- West Calder
- Livingston South
- Kirknewton
  - limited connections to Carstairs
- Curriehill
- Wester Hailes
- Kingsknowe
- Slateford
- Haymarket
- Edinburgh Waverley
  - connections to north-eastern and central Scotland, including Dundee, Stirling and Inverness as well as East Coast Main Line services

== Electrification ==
Network Rail completed an electrification project to electrify the entire line. Prior to the completion of the electrification project, parts of the route were already electrified using the 25 kV overhead system. These were:-

- Glasgow Central to Holytown
- Kirknewton to Edinburgh Waverley

The line follows the British Rail electrified West Coast Main Line as far as Uddingston Junction where it branches off to the east. Until Holytown Junction the line used by Argyle Line services. From Holytown the line continues through open countryside past Shotts and joins the Edinburgh Branch of the Caledonian Railway (part of the WCML) at Kirknewton. The central section between Holytown and Midcalder Junction was electrified by April 2019.

== Train services ==
=== Prior to December 2009 ===
A Monday to Saturday hourly service was operated on the line, calling at all stops between Glasgow Central and Edinburgh Waverley. The exceptions to this rule were: Breich which was a request stop at peak hours only, the two trains a day in either direction that travelled via Carstairs and the single afternoon service from Edinburgh via Shotts that terminated at Motherwell.

On Sundays only, a two hourly service was provided between Edinburgh and West Calder. There were no services between Addiewell and Bellshill on a Sunday.

=== December 2009 to December 2012 ===
While the original timetabled services on the route continue, albeit slightly altered, they have been supplemented by a new limited stop express passenger service. This new service operates in the gaps in the original timetable, making the route frequency now twice hourly.

The new service calls at Glasgow Central, Bellshill, Shotts, West Calder, Livingston South, Haymarket and Edinburgh Waverley only. It will see an end-to-end reduction in journey time of 33 minutes. The journey takes 65 minutes.

As of December 2009, the Shotts Line no longer serves Cambuslang, except during peak times.

=== December 2012 onwards ===
In the December 2012 timetable, the two hourly Sunday service that previously served Edinburgh – West Calder only has been extended the full length of the Shotts line, giving stations between West Calder and Bellshill a Sunday service. One late night service leaves Edinburgh and terminates at Motherwell

== CrossCountry ==
Some services operated by CrossCountry travel over the Shotts Line. Mostly these are empty coaching stock moves to/from Glasgow for driver route retention or passenger services diverted from their usual route via Carstairs due to engineering works or service disruption. There had been one service per week which was booked to travel over the line on Saturdays only (2105 Glasgow Central – Edinburgh), but this was withdrawn in the May 2023 timetable change.

== Traction ==
From 23 April 2019, ScotRail began operating a limited number of new electric Class 385 trains on the line. Class 156 and Class 158 used to operate on the line before electrification.

Freight services along the line are generally hauled using Class 66 traction, though on occasion other types may be used.

== Bellside Bridge ==
Bellside Bridge is situated between Cleland and Hartwood and crosses the A73. It is the most-struck bridge in the country, according to Network Rail in Scotland, being struck 56 times between 2011 and 2021. In August 2021, it was announced that its deck would be replaced with a slimmer version to increase clearance between the road and the bridge. The increased height of the bridge will also allow a signed diversion through Cleland village to be removed.
