= Bellshill railway station =

Railway station in North Lanarkshire, Scotland

Bellshill
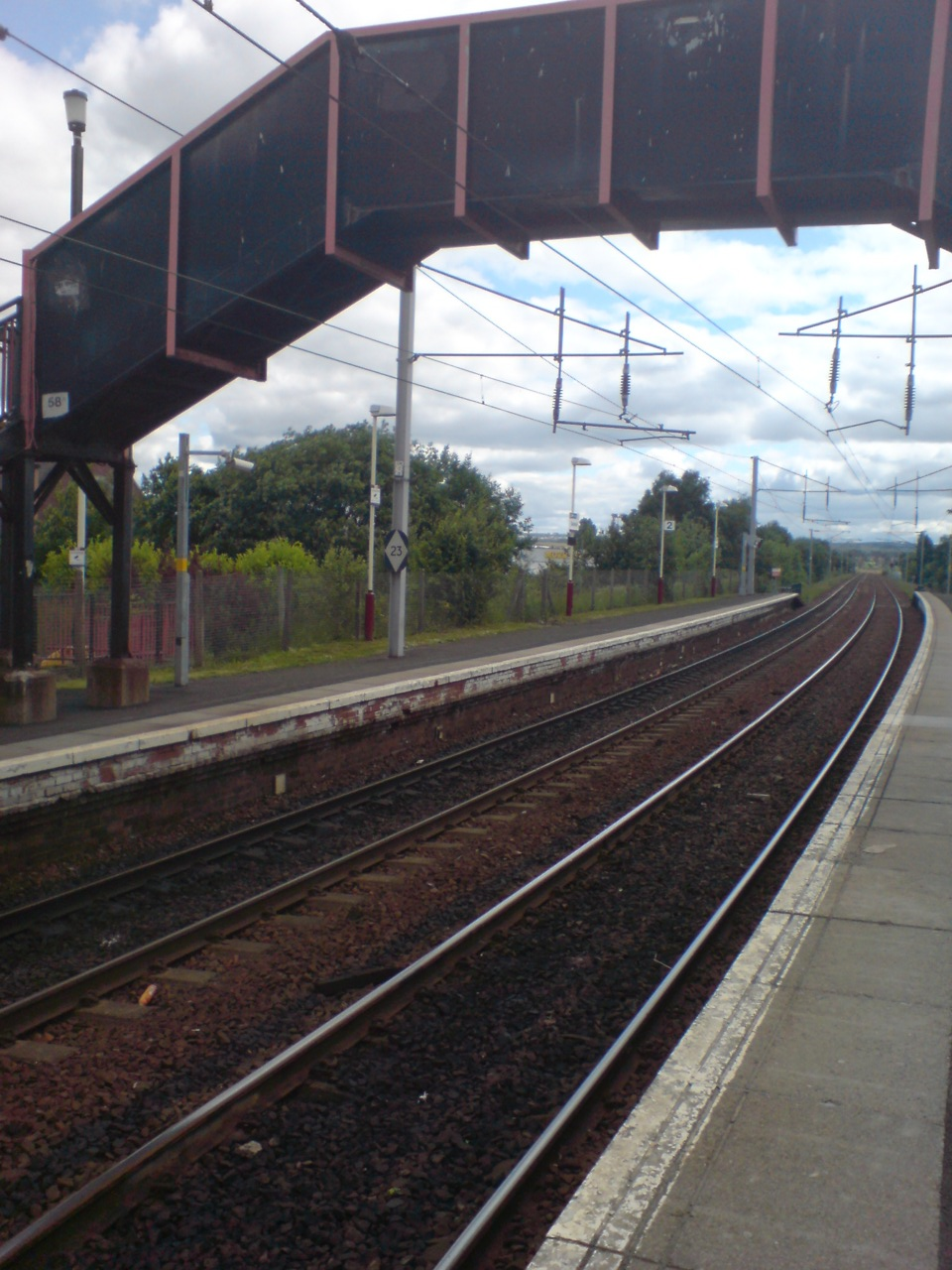

General information
- Location: Bellshill, North Lanarkshire; Scotland
- Coordinates: 55.8171°N 4.0243°W
- Grid reference: NS732600
- Manager: ScotRail
- Platforms: 2

Other information
- Station code: BLH

History
- Original company: CR (Cleland and Midcalder Line)
- Pre-grouping: Caledonian Railway
- Post-grouping: LMS

Key dates
- 1 May 1879: Opened

Passengers
- 2021/22: ▲0.381 million
- Interchange: ▲19,796
- 2022/23: ▲0.511 million
- Interchange: ▲31,838
- 2023/24: ▲0.621 million
- Interchange: ▲70,586
- 2024/25: ▲0.644 million
- Interchange: ▲85,124
- 2025/26: ▲0.659 million
- Interchange: ▲98,756
Location
Notes
- Passenger statistics from the Office of Rail and Road

Bellshill railway station is a railway station in the town of Bellshill, North Lanarkshire, Scotland. The station is managed by ScotRail and served by Argyle Line and Shotts Line services. The station is adjacent to Bellshill Main Street, on Hamilton Road, and was opened by the Caledonian Railway as part of the Cleland and Midcalder Line on 1 May 1879. West of the station, the Glasgow, Bothwell, Hamilton and Coatbridge Railway crossed with a second station in the town to the north west - this ceased to carry passengers back in 1951.

The line through the station was electrified as part of the 1974 West Coast Main Line project.

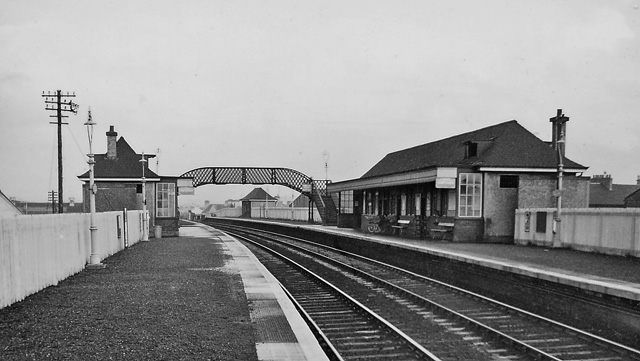
Bellshill station in October 1961

Although it is situated east of the Shotts Line's junction with the WCML south of Uddingston, electric trains can reach Motherwell using a chord line to the route from Coatbridge Central and Mossend which passes beneath the Shotts route east of the station (these lines being wired to allow electric access to the yard at Mossend and to allow goods trains to avoid the busy Motherwell area).

== Services ==
The service Mondays-Saturdays is:

- 2tph to Edinburgh Waverley via Shotts
- 2tph to Lanark via Motherwell
- 4tph to Glasgow Central High Level

There are additional peak trains to Anderston via Central L.L. and to Carstairs (both via Shieldmuir and via Holytown), and infrequent services on the North Berwick Line. Regular daytime services through to Partick and beyond via Central L.L. ended at the December 2014 timetable change.

On a Sunday, the pattern is as follows:

- 1tph to Lanark via Motherwell
- 1tph to Motherwell
- 1tp2h to Edinburgh Waverley
- 2tph to Glasgow Central

Preceding station	National Rail	Following station
Motherwell	ScotRail; Argyle Line	Uddingston
Holytown or Shotts	ScotRail; Shotts Line	Uddingston or Glasgow Central
	Historical railways	
Holytown; Line and station open	Caledonian Railway; Cleland and Midcalder Line	Uddingston; Line and station open

== Bibliography ==
- Butt, R. V. J. (October 1995). The Directory of Railway Stations: details every public and private passenger station, halt, platform and stopping place, past and present (1st ed.). Sparkford: Patrick Stephens Ltd. ISBN 978-1-85260-508-7. OCLC 60251199. OL 11956311M.
- Jowett, Alan (March 1989). Jowett's Railway Atlas of Great Britain and Ireland: From Pre-Grouping to the Present Day (1st ed.). Sparkford: Patrick Stephens Ltd. ISBN 978-1-85260-086-0. OCLC 22311137.
- Jowett, Alan (2000). Jowett's Nationalised Railway Atlas (1st ed.). Penryn, Cornwall: Atlantic Transport Publishers. ISBN 978-0-906899-99-1. OCLC 228266687.
- Nock, Oswald (1974). Electric Euston to Glasgow (1st ed.). London: Ian Allan Limited. ISBN 0-7110-0530-3. OCLC 2283378.
- RAILSCOT on Cleland and Midcalder Line
- Bellshill railway station on historic OS Map
