= Shotts railway station =

Railway station in North Lanarkshire, Scotland

Shotts
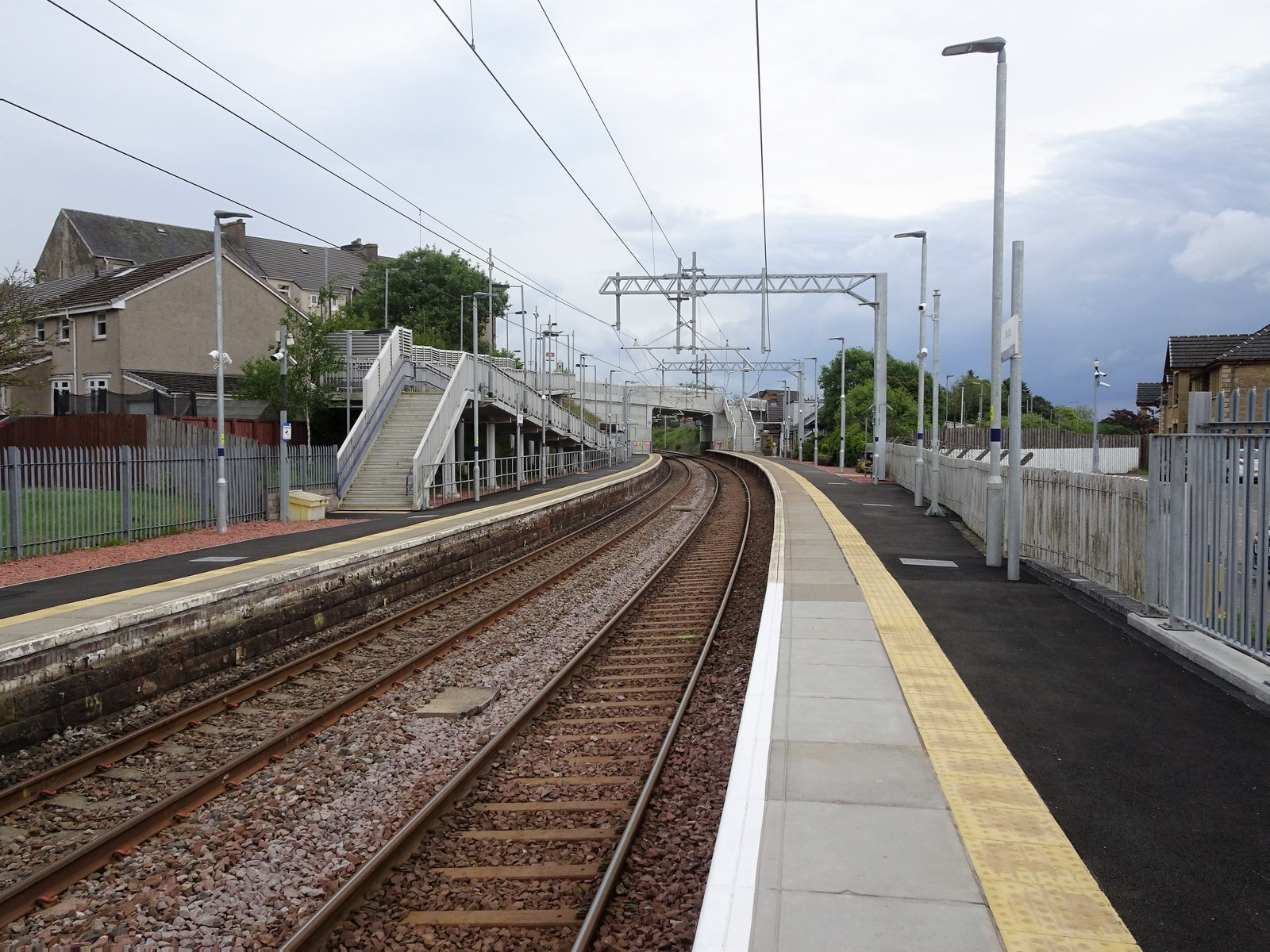
- Shotts in 2019, following electrification

General information
- Location: Shotts, North Lanarkshire; Scotland
- Coordinates: 55.8186°N 3.7989°W
- Grid reference: NS874598
- Managed by: ScotRail
- Transit authority: SPT
- Platforms: 2

Other information
- Station code: SHS

Key dates
- 9 July 1869: Opened

Passengers
- 2020/21: ▼25,126
- 2021/22: ▲90,192
- 2022/23: ▲0.113 million
- 2023/24: ▲0.150 million
- 2024/25: ▲0.173 million
Location
Notes
- Passenger statistics from the Office of Rail and Road

Shotts railway station is a railway station serving Shotts in North Lanarkshire, Scotland. It is located on the Shotts Line, 20½ miles (33 km) east of Glasgow Central towards Edinburgh Waverley. It was opened by the Caledonian Railway in 1869 as one of the principal stations on their Cleland and Midcalder Line.

Shotts station is the last stop in the SPT area boundary before the train enters West Lothian. There is a large car park in part of the former goods yard.

== Services ==
Monday to Saturdays, there is generally a twice-hourly service westbound to Glasgow Central (normally 15 minutes past and half past the hour) and eastbound to Edinburgh Waverley (normally half past and 55 minutes past the hour). One of these is a semi-fast service serving Bellshill, Livingston South, West Calder and Haymarket only, whilst the other stops at all intermediate stations except Cambuslang (limited service) and Breich (which has only one call each way per weekday).

Since 9 December 2012 there has been a new two-hourly Sunday service between Glasgow Central and Edinburgh Waverley.

Preceding station	National Rail	Following station
Fauldhouse or West Calder	ScotRail; Shotts Line	Hartwood or Bellshill

== Sources ==
- Butt, R. V. J. (October 1995). The Directory of Railway Stations: details every public and private passenger station, halt, platform and stopping place, past and present (1st ed.). Sparkford: Patrick Stephens Ltd. ISBN 978-1-85260-508-7. OCLC 60251199. OL 11956311M.
