= Cleland and Midcalder Line =

Historic railway line in Scotland

Overview
- Headquarters: Glasgow
- Locale: Scotland
- Dates of operation: 9 July 1869–31 December 1922
- Successor: London Midland and Scottish Railway

Technical
- Track gauge: 1,435 mm (4 ft 8 1/2 in)

Cleland and Midcalder Line is a historic railway line in Scotland. Built by the Caledonian Railway and opened in 1869, it provides a link between Glasgow and Edinburgh through the mining communities of Lanarkshire and West Lothian.

== History ==
The line was built by the Caledonian Railway to serve a variety of industrial locations, including collieries, iron mines and an oil works near Addiewell. It followed the route of an earlier private industrial line built to serve a number of mines in the area. The line became part of the London, Midland and Scottish Railway at the 1923 Grouping, then the Scottish Region of British Railways upon nationalisation in January 1948. None of the industries once served by the line still survive - the last of the collieries served by it (at Polkemmet) having closed down in 1986.

== Connections to other lines ==
- Clydesdale Junction Railway at Uddingston Junction
- Caledonian Railway Main Line (Carstairs to Greenhill Junction) at Mossend Junctions and Midcalder Junction
- Wishaw Deviation Line at Holytown South Junction
- Wishaw and Coltness Railway at Newarthill and Cleland Junctions
- Caledonian Railway Main Line (Carstairs to Edinburgh) at Midcalder Junction

== Current operations ==
The line is open, being electrified between Uddingston Junction and Holytown South Junction.

- Shotts Line trains operate along the whole length of the line.
- Argyle Line trains operate on the electrified section between Uddingston and Holytown South Junctions.
- Occasional West Coast Main Line trains operate between Uddingston and Holytown South Junctions, to avoid Motherwell
