= Garscadden (disambiguation) =

Garscadden is a district of Glasgow.

Garscadden may also refer to:

- Garscadden Wood, nature reserve
- Glasgow Garscadden (UK Parliament constituency)
- Kathleen Garscadden (1897–1991), Scottish radio presenter
- Garscadden railway station
