= Whiteinch Riverside railway station =

Former railway station in Scotland

Coordinates: 55.8711°N 4.3308°W

Whiteinch Riverside
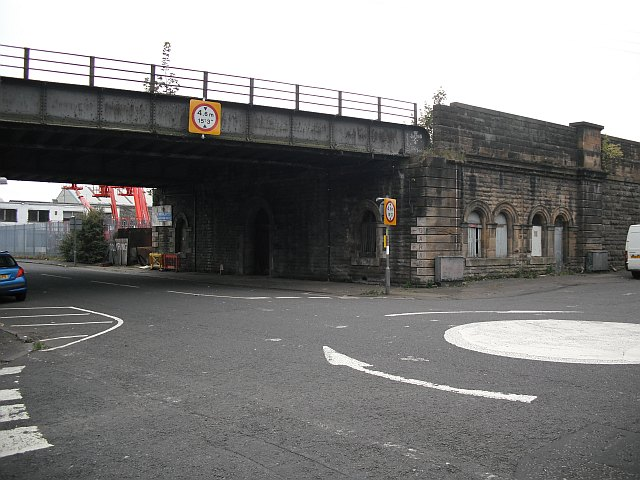

General information
- Location: Whiteinch, Glasgow; Scotland
- Platforms: 2

Other information
- Status: Disused

History
- Original company: Lanarkshire and Dunbartonshire Railway
- Pre-grouping: Caledonian Railway
- Post-grouping: London Midland and Scottish Railway

Key dates
- 10 October 1896: Opened as Whiteinch
- 28 February 1953: Renamed as Whiteinch Riverside
- 5 October 1964: Closed
Location

Whiteinch Riverside railway station served the Whiteinch area of the city of Glasgow. It was a two platform station on the Lanarkshire and Dunbartonshire Railway.

== Passenger services ==
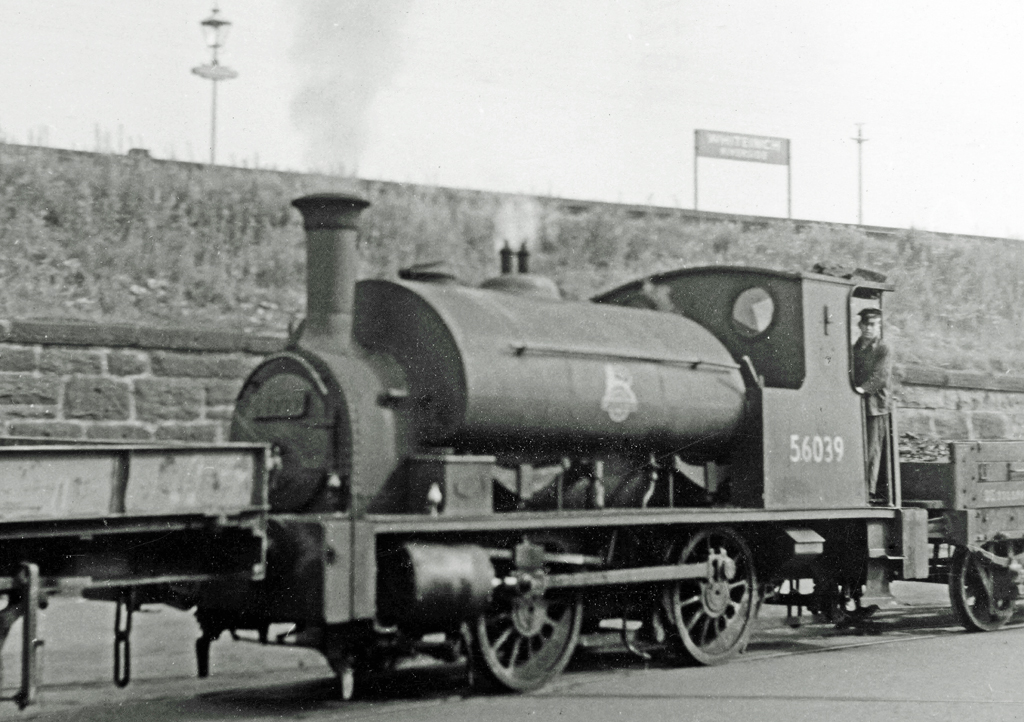
Whiteinch railway station (above) in 1958 with a Caledonian Railway 264 Class 0-4-0ST locomotive shunting in South Street below on the street level lines which served the shipyards, lairage and granary adjacent to the Clyde.

The station was located in an elevated position and was served by Caledonian Railway passenger trains from Glasgow (Central) via Partick Central and onwards to Dumbarton railway station and Balloch. From January 1923, the service was operated by the London Midland & Scottish Railway.

== Routes ==
Preceding station	Historical railways	Following station
Scotstoun East; Line and station closed	Lanarkshire and Dunbartonshire Railway operated by Caledonian Railway	Crow Road; Line and station closed
Scotstoun East; Line and station closed	Lanarkshire and Dunbartonshire Railway operated by Caledonian Railway	Partick West; Line and station closed
