= Bowling railway station (disambiguation) =

Bowling railway station is a station on the North Clyde Line in Bowling, West Dunbartonshire, in Scotland.

Bowling railway station may also refer to:

- Bowling railway station (Lanarkshire and Dunbartonshire Railway), a station in the same town, on the former Lanarkshire and Dunbartonshire Railway
- Bowling railway station (England), a station on the former Great Northern Railway in Bradford, West Yorkshire
