= Dumbarton East railway station =

Railway station in West Dunbartonshire, Scotland

Dumbarton East Scottish Gaelic: Dùn Breatann an Ear
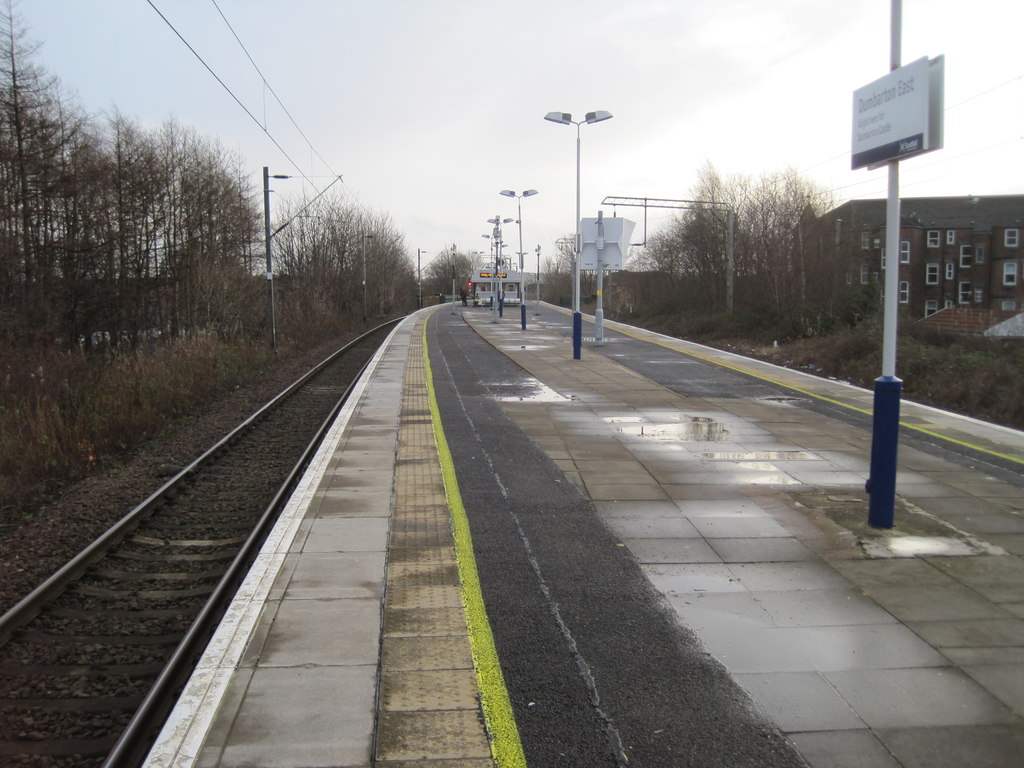

General information
- Location: Dumbarton, West Dunbartonshire; Scotland
- Coordinates: 55.9426°N 4.5542°W
- Grid reference: NS405750
- Manager: ScotRail
- Platforms: 2

Other information
- Station code: DBE

History
- Original company: Lanarkshire and Dunbartonshire Railway
- Pre-grouping: Caledonian Railway
- Post-grouping: LMS

Key dates
- 1 October 1896: Opened

Passengers
- 2021/22: ▲0.191 million
- 2022/23: ▲0.253 million
- 2023/24: ▲0.302 million
- 2024/25: ▲0.340 million
- 2025/26: ▼0.339 million
Location
Notes
- Passenger statistics from the Office of Rail and Road

Dumbarton East railway station serves the town of Dumbarton in the West Dunbartonshire region of Scotland. The station is managed by ScotRail and is served by trains on the North Clyde Line, 15 miles (24 km) west of Glasgow Queen Street.

== History ==
Unlike the majority of the North Clyde line stations, this is an island platform, betraying its Lanarkshire and Dunbartonshire Railway origins. At the time of electrification by British Railways in 1961, the North British Railway's formation from Bowling was abandoned (except a short spur to serve Bowling Oil Terminal), with a short link line between the North British and Caledonian formations being constructed. The North British formation is regained between Dumbarton East and Dumbarton Central station at the site of the junction between the two railways.

== Services ==
As of March 2025, the typical off-peak service in trains per hour (tph) and trains per day (tpd) is:

- 2 tph to Edinburgh Waverley via Glasgow Queen Street (low-level) (semi-fast)
- 2 tph to Airdie via Singer and Glasgow Queen Street (low-level)
- 2 tph to Balloch
- 2 tph to Helensburgh Central

The typical service on Sundays is:

- 2 tph to Edinburgh Waverley via Singer and Glasgow Queen Street
- 1 tph to Motherwell via Yoker, Glasgow Central and Whifflet
- 1 tph to Larkhall via Yoker, Glasgow Central and Hamilton Central
- 2 tph to Helensburgh Central
- 2 tph to Balloch

Preceding station	National Rail	Following station
Bowling or Dalmuir	ScotRail; North Clyde Line	Dumbarton Central
	Historical railways	
Bowling (L&D); Line partially in use; Station closed	Caledonian Railway; Lanarkshire and Dunbartonshire Railway	Dumbarton Central; Line open; Station open
