= Old Kilpatrick railway station =

Former railway station in Scotland

Coordinates: 55.9212°N 4.4567°W

Old Kilpatrick
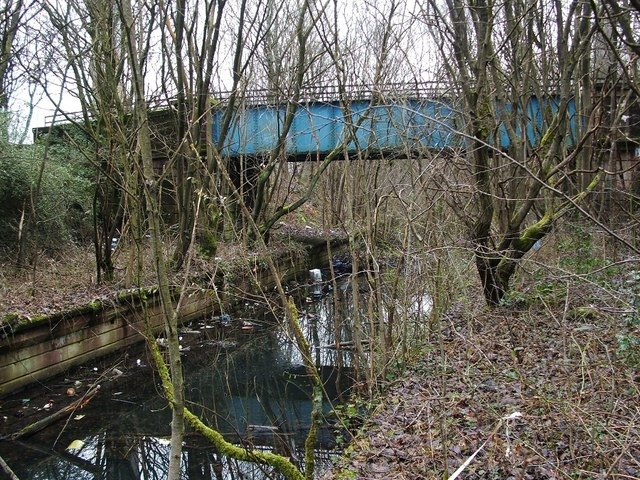

General information
- Location: Old Kilpatrick, West Dunbartonshire; Scotland
- Platforms: 2

Other information
- Status: Disused

History
- Original company: Lanarkshire and Dunbartonshire Railway
- Pre-grouping: Caledonian Railway

Key dates
- 10 October 1896: Opened
- 5 October 1964: Closed
Location

Old Kilpatrick railway station was located in the village of Old Kilpatrick, Scotland on the Lanarkshire and Dunbartonshire Railway.

The station opened in 1896 and was closed in 1964 (along with much of the L&DR route) as part of the route rationalisation plan associated with the North Clyde electrification scheme.

As in 2025 the platforms still remain in situ and the trackbed between them is flooded.

== See also ==
- Kilpatrick railway station

Preceding station	Historical railways	Following station
Dalmuir Riverside; Line and station closed	Lanarkshire and Dunbartonshire Railway	Bowling; Line and station closed
