= Kelvinside =

District of Glasgow, Scotland

Coordinates: 55.883524°N 4.305299°W

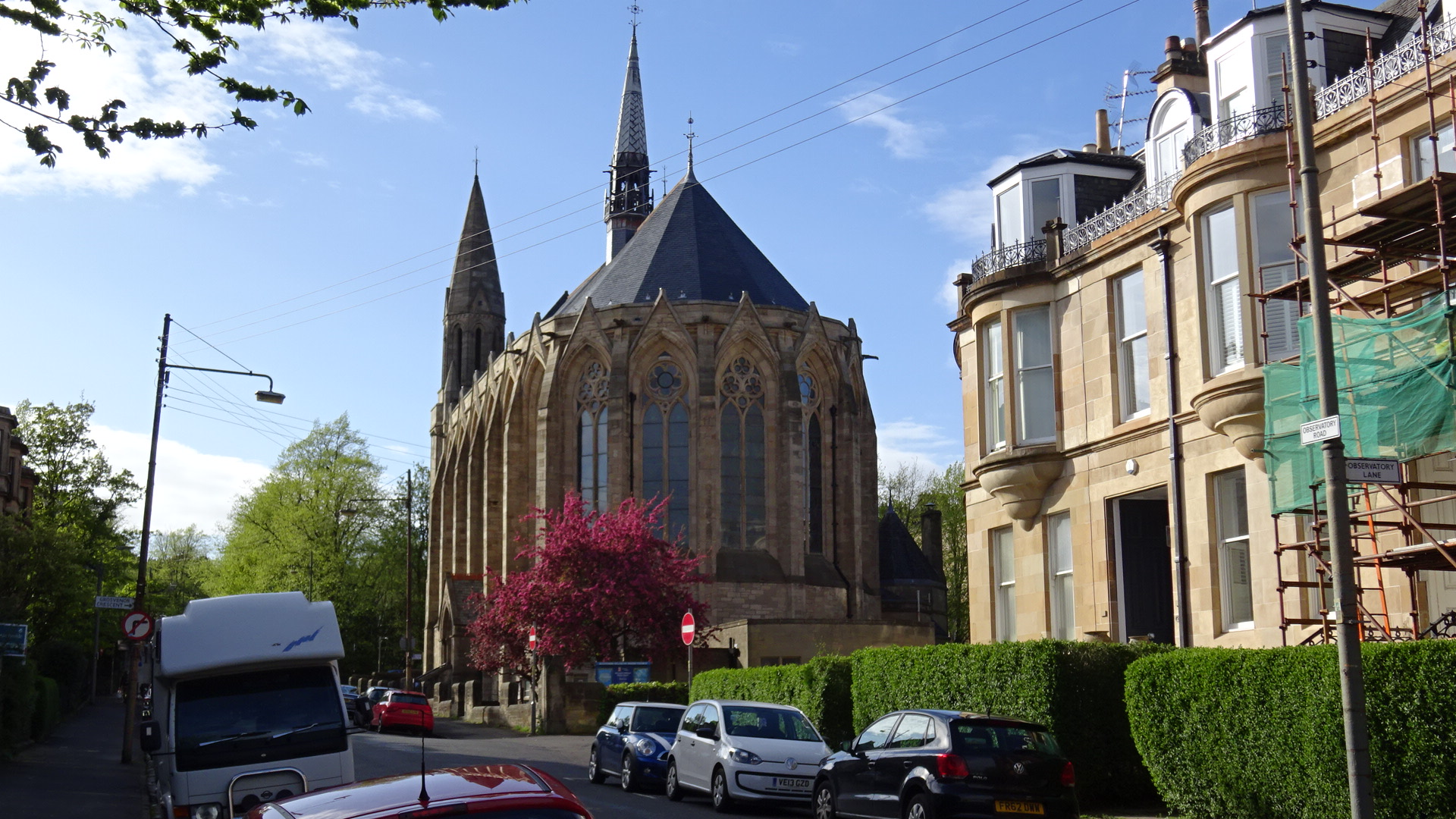
- Kelvinside Hillhead, Church of Scotland parish church, 2018

- Location within Glasgow
- OS grid reference: NS559680
- Council area: Glasgow City Council
- Lieutenancy area: Glasgow
- Country: Scotland
- Sovereign state: United Kingdom
- Post town: GLASGOW
- Postcode district: G12
- Dialling code: 0141
- Police: Scotland
- Fire: Scottish
- Ambulance: Scottish
- UK Parliament: Glasgow North
- Scottish Parliament: Glasgow Kelvin and Maryhill

Kelvinside is a district in the Scottish city of Glasgow. It is situated north of the River Clyde and is bounded by Broomhill, Dowanhill and Hyndland to the south with Kelvindale and the River Kelvin to the north. It is an area of Glasgow, with large Victorian villas and terraces.

As with Morningside, Edinburgh, residents are sometimes said to have a "pan loaf" accent, i.e. an affected one. This often leads to jokes about a "Kelvinsaide" accent. Both of these areas were featured in an advert for ScotRail.

Kelvinside railway station was on the Lanarkshire and Dunbartonshire Railway, but is now closed.

Kelvinside is home to Kelvinside Academy, a private school situated on the corner of Kirklee Road and Bellshaugh Road.

At the corner of Kirklee Road and Great Western Road used to be a shop called Churchill's. Churchill's began life as a green hut just a little bigger than an average-sized garage. It was known by locals as the "Greenie". In the 1990s it was replaced by a new two-storey stone building, with a flat in the upper floor and a shop on the ground floor. Although clad with brown stained wood, it was still referred to as the Greenie or Churchill's by local pupils of Kelvinside Academy. It closed during COVID and was replaced by a delicatessen and restaurant.

The local Church of Scotland parish churches (serving Kelvinside and parts of adjacent areas) are Kelvinside Hillhead Parish Church and St. John's Renfield Church. The local Roman Catholic church is St. Gregory's.

== Notable buildings ==
Great Western Terrace, designed by Alexander "Greek" Thomson, is situated on Great Western Road. Westbourne Terrace, also designed by Thomson, is situated on Hyndland Road.

== Notable people ==
- Norman Stone, Scottish historian, author and professor
- Sir Henry Campbell-Bannerman, UK Prime Minister 5 December 1905 – 3 April 1908
- Kirsty Wark, broadcaster
