= Clydebank railway station =

Railway station in West Dunbartonshire, Scotland

Clydebank Scottish Gaelic: Bruach Chluaidh
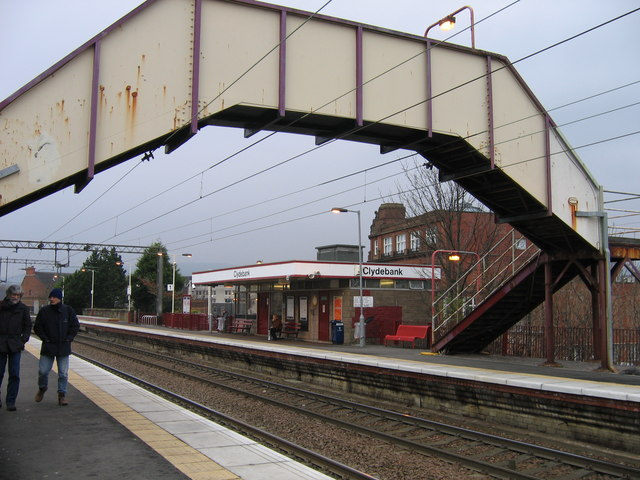

General information
- Location: Clydebank, West Dunbartonshire; Scotland
- Coordinates: 55.9006°N 4.4042°W
- Grid reference: NS497701
- Manager: ScotRail
- Transit authority: SPT
- Platforms: 2

Other information
- Station code: CYK

History
- Original company: Glasgow, Yoker and Clydebank Railway
- Pre-grouping: North British Railway
- Post-grouping: LNER

Key dates
- 1 December 1882: Opened

Passengers
- 2021/22: ▲0.173 million
- 2022/23: ▲0.219 million
- 2023/24: ▲0.291 million
- 2024/25: ▲0.305 million
- 2025/26: ▲0.318 million
Location
Notes
- Passenger statistics from the Office of Rail and Road

Clydebank railway station is a railway station serving the town of Clydebank in West Dunbartonshire, Scotland. It is located on the Argyle Line and the North Clyde Line. Passenger services are operated by ScotRail.

== History ==
The station (which was formerly known as Clydebank Central) dates from 1897, when the North British Railway commissioned a link line from the former Glasgow, Yoker and Clydebank Railway route from Jordanhill through to Dalmuir on the Glasgow, Dumbarton and Helensburgh Railway. It replaced the original GY&CR Clydebank terminus, which was then renamed Clydebank East (closed in 1959).

== Services ==
=== 2008 ===
The station is staffed part-time and has two platforms on a high level. It is served by 4 to 6 trains per hour:

- Dalmuir to Lanark
- Dalmuir to Motherwell via Glasgow Central Low level
- Dalmuir to Springburn via Glasgow Queen Street Low level
- Drumgelloch (1989) station to Helensburgh Central (limited stop trains tend to only call in the evenings).

On a Sunday, trains stop every 30 minutes operating between Balloch and Motherwell.

=== 2013 ===
The basic daytime weekday service from the station is 4 trains per hour each way (15 minute intervals). Eastbound these run alternately to Springburn via Queen St L.L and to Motherwell via Central L.L and Bellshill; every second service on the latter route is extended to Lanark. Westbound, all services terminate at Dalmuir. In the evenings, the frequency drops to half-hourly but trains run through to Edinburgh via Queen St L.L and Bathgate eastbound and to Helensburgh Central westbound.

On Sundays, the service is half-hourly each way to Balloch & Motherwell.

=== 2016 ===
The basic service frequency from here remain unchanged, but alternate westbound trains now extend to Dumbarton Central & eastbound trains now run alternately to either Cumbernauld via Queen St L.L or to Whifflet/Motherwell via Central L.L. Arrivals on the Argyle Line are from Motherwell via Hamilton, with alternating services running through from Cumbernauld. This frequency now operates throughout the day until end of service. The Sunday service to Balloch is still half hourly but southeast-bound trains now run alternately either to Motherwell via Whifflet or Larkhall.

=== 2026 ===
As of the May 2026 timetable, the station stil receives 4 trains per hour (tph) in each direction from Monday-Saturday, which is roughly halved on Sundays.

The majority of westbound services terminate at Dalmuir, however some late-night services, as well as all services on a Sunday, are extended to Balloch via Dumbarton Central.

Eastbound services run via Partick (for connections to the Glasgow Subway) and Glasgow Central Low Level to Whifflet (2tph, one of which is extended to Motherwell) and Motherwell via Hamilton Central (2tph, one of which is extended to Cumbernauld via Coatbridge Central). On Sundays, the service pattern is 1tph to Motherwell via Whifflet and 1tph to Larkhall via Hamilton Central.

In the early mornings and late evenings, a small number of services run to Rutherglen, Carstairs, Springburn and Edinburgh.

Many services between Edinburgh and Helensburgh Central pass through the station without stopping.

Preceding station	National Rail	Following station
Yoker	ScotRail; Argyle Line	Dalmuir
Yoker	ScotRail; North Clyde Line	Dalmuir
	Historical railways	
Yoker	North British Railway; Glasgow, Yoker and Clydebank Railway	Dalmuir
