= Kelvinside railway station =

Former railway station in Scotland

Kelvinside
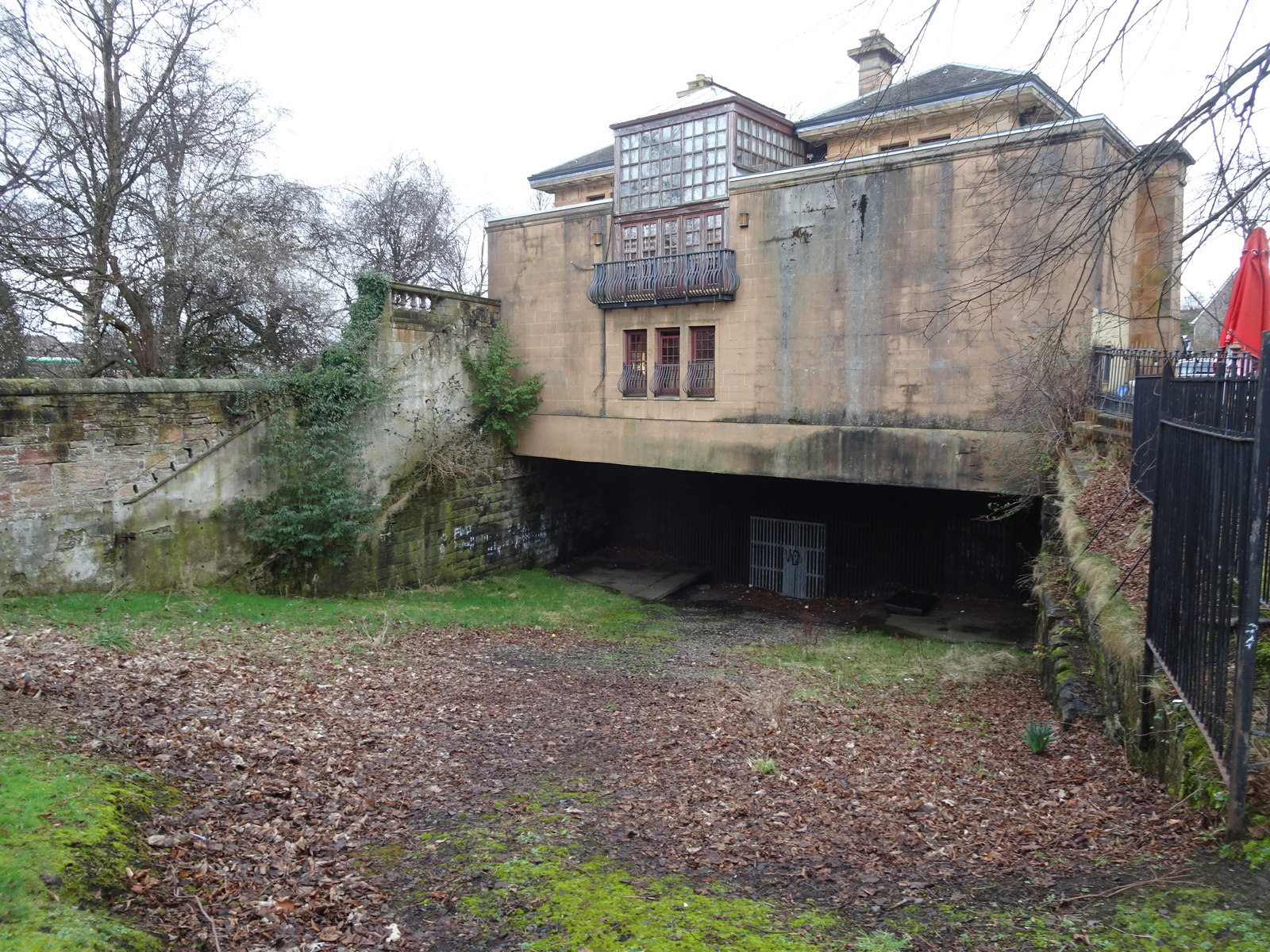
- The site of the station in 2019

General information
- Location: Kelvinside, Glasgow; Scotland
- Coordinates: 55.88441°N 4.3095°W
- Grid reference: NS556680
- Platforms: 2

Other information
- Status: Disused

History
- Original company: Lanarkshire and Dunbartonshire Railway
- Pre-grouping: Caledonian Railway
- Post-grouping: London Midland and Scottish Railway

Key dates
- 1 October 1896: Opened
- 1 January 1917: Closed
- 1 June 1919: Re-opened
- 1 July 1942: Closed
Location

Kelvinside railway station was located on Great Western Road, next to the current Gartnavel General Hospital in the Kelvinside area of Glasgow, Scotland. Part of the Lanarkshire and Dunbartonshire Railway services ran through the station from Glasgow city centre to Maryhill in the north of the city and beyond. The line from the station to Crow Road railway station passes under the current site of Hyndland railway station on the Argyle and North Clyde lines.

It was a two platform station, with a nearby goods yard. Upon closure the line as part of the Beeching Axe the area has now been redeveloped with housing. The former station building was designed by Sir John James Burnet and was subjected to numerous arson attacks while it was closed but now houses a restaurant called '1051 GWR'. Previously, the building housed a restaurant and bar called 'Carriages' but a fire in December 1995 left just a shell of masonry and lay as a ruin for many years before reopening in its present incarnation.

The Caledonian Railway monogram "CR" is still carved into the stone on the building's north facade.

Preceding station	Historical railways	Following station
Crow Road; Line and station closed	Lanarkshire and Dunbartonshire Railway operated by Caledonian Railway	Maryhill Central; Line and station closed
