= Partick West railway station =

Former railway station in Scotland

Coordinates: 55.8696°N 4.3179°W

Partick West
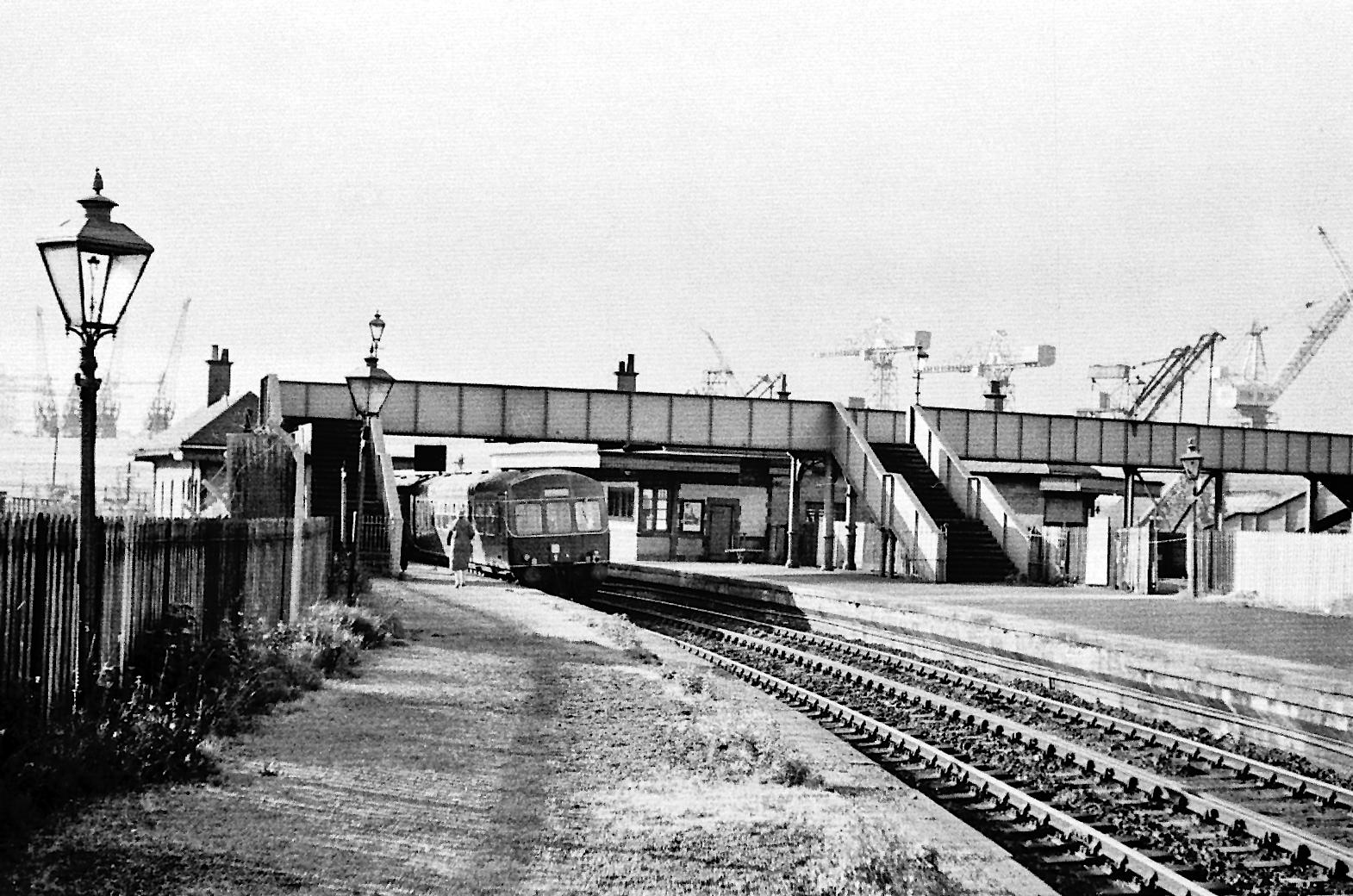
- April 1962

General information
- Location: Thornwood, Glasgow; Scotland
- Grid reference: NS551664
- Platforms: 4

Other information
- Status: Disused

History
- Original company: Lanarkshire and Dunbartonshire Railway
- Pre-grouping: Caledonian Railway

Key dates
- 10 October 1896: Opened
- 5 October 1964: Closed
Location

Partick West railway station was a station that served the Partick area of the city of Glasgow, particularly the Thornwood section of Partick from 1896 to 1964. It was a four platform station on the Lanarkshire and Dunbartonshire Railway, with two platforms on an east–west line with services between Dumbarton and Glasgow city centre and a further two platforms on a north–south line with services between Maryhill and the city centre.

The station was situated beside the imposing building of the Meadowside Granary, which has since been demolished and replaced by part of the Glasgow Harbour development. Passenger services stopped using Partick West in the 1960s as part of the Beeching Axe which drastically cut rail services across the United Kingdom.

Partick West was one of three stations which served the Partick area, along with Partickhill and Partick Central (latterly called Kelvin Hall). None of these stations exist now, and since 1979 the area has been served by one Partick station which combines rail, underground and bus services.

== Routes ==
Preceding station	Historical railways	Following station
Partick Central; Line and station closed	Lanarkshire and Dunbartonshire Railway operated by Caledonian Railway	Crow Road; Line and station closed
Partick Central; Line and station closed	Lanarkshire and Dunbartonshire Railway operated by Caledonian Railway	Whiteinch Riverside; Line and station closed
