= Clydebank East railway station =

Disused railway station in Clydebank, West Dunbartonshire

Clydebank East
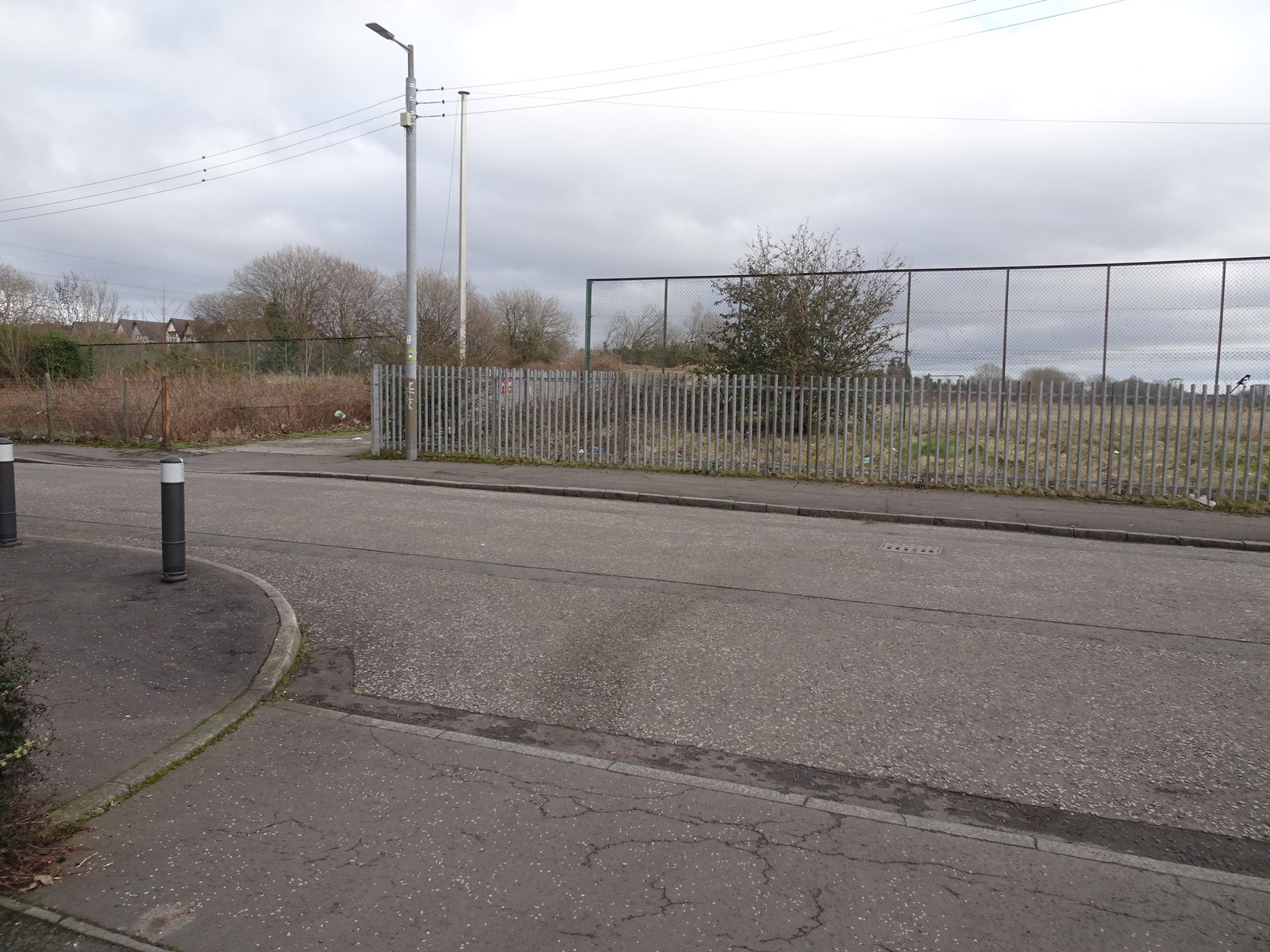
- The site of the station in 2019

General information
- Location: Clydebank, West Dunbartonshire; Scotland
- Coordinates: 55.8983°N 4.4002°W
- Grid reference: NS500698
- Platforms: 2

Other information
- Status: Disused

History
- Original company: Glasgow, Yoker and Clydebank Railway
- Pre-grouping: North British Railway
- Post-grouping: London and North Eastern Railway; British Railways (Scottish Region)

Key dates
- 1 December 1882: Opened as Clydebank
- 17 May 1897: Name changed to Clydebank East
- 14 September 1959: Closed
Location

Clydebank East railway station served the town of Clydebank, West Dunbartonshire, Scotland, from 1882 to 1959 on the Glasgow, Yoker and Clydebank Railway.

== History ==
The station was opened on 1 December 1882 by the Glasgow, Yoker and Clydebank Railway. It was originally a terminus until Dalmuir and Clydebank (originally Clydebank Central) opened to the west on 17 May 1897, at which point the older station's name changed to Clydebank East. It had carriage sidings on either side, goods sidings to the south, which served John Brown & Company shipyard and Clydebank East Shed. The station closed on 14 September 1959.

Preceding station	Disused railways	Following station
Yoker; Line and station closed	Glasgow, Yoker and Clydebank Railway	Clydebank; Line and station closed
