= Crow Road railway station =

Former railway station in Scotland

Crow Road
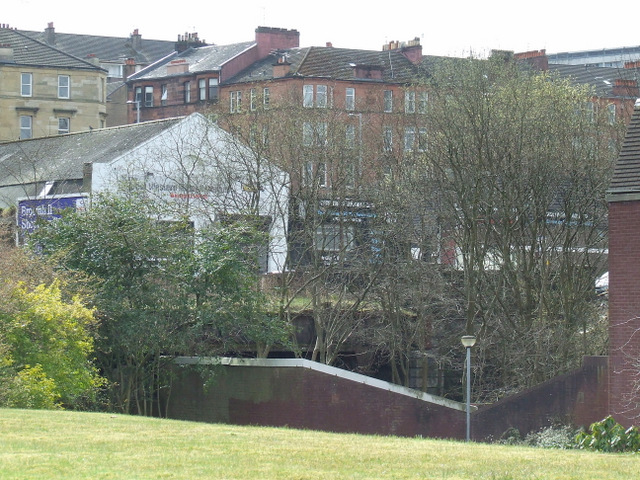
- The site of the station in 2013

General information
- Location: Broomhill, Glasgow; Scotland
- Coordinates: 55.8762°N 4.3165°W
- Grid reference: NS551672
- Platforms: 2

Other information
- Status: Disused

History
- Original company: Lanarkshire and Dunbartonshire Railway
- Pre-grouping: Caledonian Railway
- Post-grouping: London Midland and Scottish Railway

Key dates
- 1 October 1896: Opened
- 6 November 1960: Closed
- 1970: Station demolished
Location

Crow Road railway station was located in Glasgow, Scotland and served the Broomhill and Hyndland areas of that city.

On the Lanarkshire and Dunbartonshire Railway it was located on the road from which it took its name and sat to the north of a tunnel which connected it with Partick West railway station. The line ran on to Kelvinside railway station. This route went underneath the present day Hyndland railway station, which opened the day before Crow Road closed, on the present Argyle and North Clyde lines.

== Route ==
Preceding station	Historical railways	Following station
Partick West; Line and station closed	Lanarkshire and Dunbartonshire Railway operated by Caledonian Railway	Kelvinside; Line and station closed
Whiteinch Riverside; Line and station closed	Lanarkshire and Dunbartonshire Railway operated by Caledonian Railway	Kelvinside; Line and station closed
