= Dumbarton Central railway station =

Railway station in West Dunbartonshire, Scotland

Dumbarton Central Scottish Gaelic: Dùn Breatann Meadhain
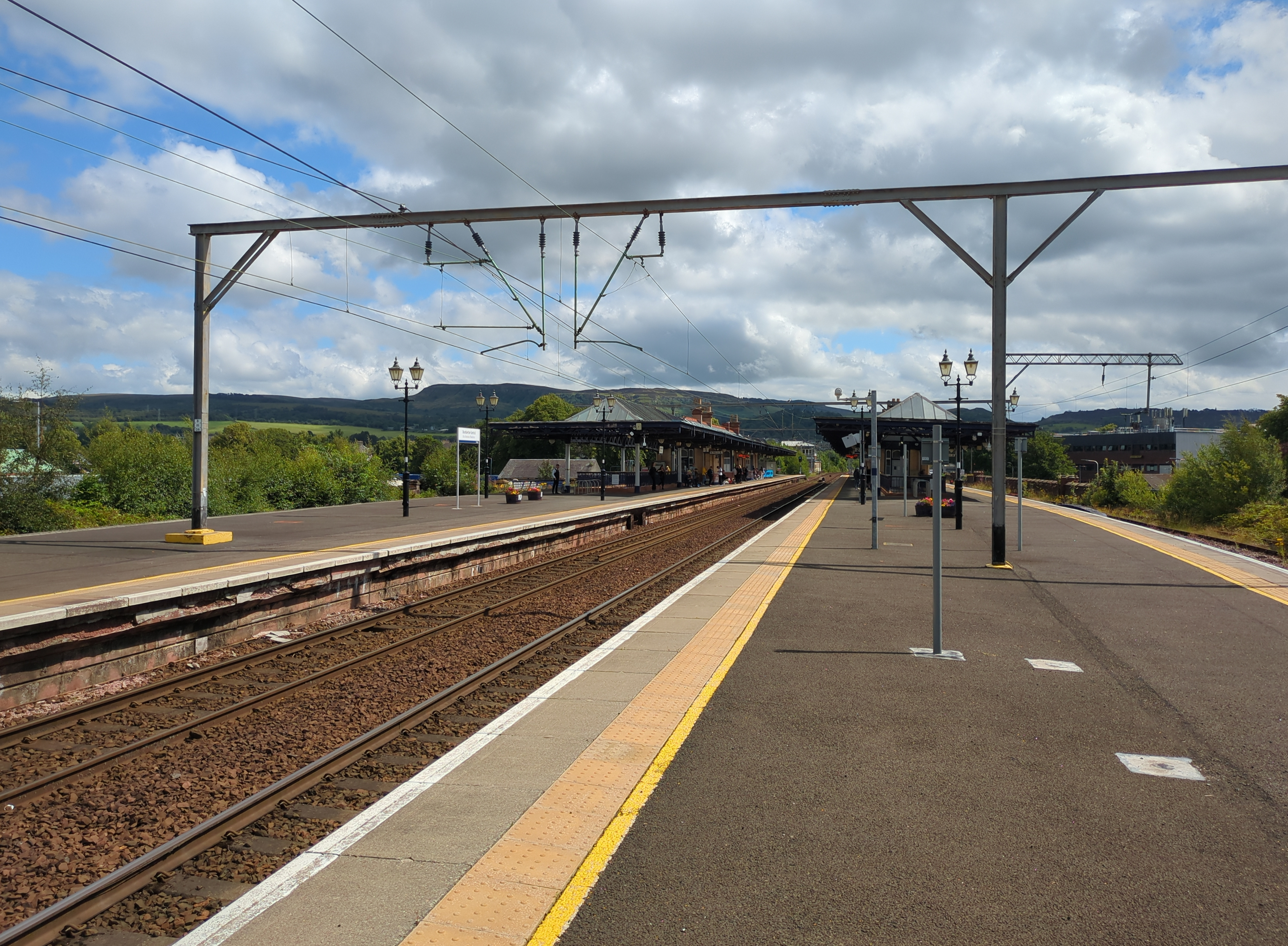
- View of Dumbarton Central station, looking east

General information
- Location: Dumbarton, West Dunbartonshire; Scotland
- Coordinates: 55.9465°N 4.5673°W
- Grid reference: NS397755
- Owner: Network Rail
- Manager: ScotRail
- Transit authority: SPT
- Platforms: 3

Other information
- Station code: DBC
- Fare zone: D2

History
- Original company: Lanarkshire and Dunbartonshire Railway & Caledonian and Dunbartonshire Junction Railway
- Pre-grouping: Caledonian Railway & North British Railway
- Post-grouping: LMS & LNER

Key dates
- 15 July 1850: Opened

Passengers
- 2021/22: ▲0.310 million
- Interchange: ▲53,273
- 2022/23: ▲0.399 million
- Interchange: ▼50,889
- 2023/24: ▲0.461 million
- Interchange: ▲57,956
- 2024/25: ▲0.483 million
- Interchange: ▲63,659
- 2025/26: ▼0.480 million
- Interchange: ▲67,010

Listed Building – Category A
- Designated: 31 January 1984
- Reference no.: LB24877
Location
Notes
- Passenger statistics from the Office of Rail and Road

Dumbarton Central railway station serves the town of Dumbarton in West Dunbartonshire, Scotland. This station is on the West Highland Line and the North Clyde Line, 15 3/4 miles (25.3 km) northwest of Glasgow Queen Street.

== History ==
The station was opened on 15 July 1850 by the Caledonian and Dumbartonshire Junction Railway on their route from Balloch Pier to Bowling, where travellers could join steamships on the River Clyde to get to Glasgow. Connections with the Glasgow, Dumbarton and Helensburgh Railway at Dalreoch Junction and at Bowling put the station on a through route between Glasgow Queen Street and Helensburgh Central by 1858. The company was subsequently absorbed by the Edinburgh and Glasgow Railway in 1862 and eventually became part of the North British Railway three years later. However, in 1891, the North British was forced to come to an agreement with the rival Caledonian Railway to give the latter access to Balloch (and the Loch Lomond steamships) over C&DJR metals in order to prevent the building of a competing route by the Caledonian company - this resulted in the Lanarkshire and Dumbartonshire Railway arriving from Possil via Maryhill Central in 1896. Trains on the West Highland Railway also began serving the station following its completion on 1 August 1894 and these continue to call here to this day.

The station was built with two island platforms to permit convenient interchange between the various services that called, although only three faces remain in use (the former down loop on the southbound side having been removed). The Helensburgh and Balloch lines were electrified by British Railways as part of the 1960 North Clyde Line electrification scheme, but most of the L&DR route was closed (other than the short section through neighbouring Dumbarton East) when passenger services to Possil via Dalmuir Riverside were withdrawn on 5 October 1964 as a result of the Beeching Axe. As of 2022, the loop platform on the south side of the station receives no regular services.

== Building ==
It is a category A listed building under the Town and Country Planning (Listed Buildings and Conservation Areas) (Scotland) Act 1997.

== Passenger volume ==
Passenger volume at Dumbarton Central
	2019-20	2020-21	2021-22
Entries and exits	718,088	75,242	309,658
Interchanges	102,905	8,003	53,273

The statistics cover twelve-month periods that start in April.

== Services ==
=== ScotRail ===
The station is located on the North Clyde line, with frequent services to Helensburgh, Balloch, Glasgow and Edinburgh, and it is the last station on the North Clyde line where trains on the West Highland line between Glasgow and Oban and Mallaig call before diverging from the line just before Craigendoran.

As of March 2025, the typical off-peak service in trains per hour (tph) and trains per day (tpd) is:

- 2 tph to Edinburgh Waverley via Glasgow Queen Street (semi-fast)
- 2 tph to Airdie via Singer and Glasgow Queen Street
- 2 tph to Balloch
- 2 tph to Helensburgh Central
- 6 tpd to Glasgow Queen Street (fast)
- 6 tpd to Oban, of which 3 have a portion which divides at Crianlarich and runs to Mallaig via Fort William

The typical service on Sundays is:

- 2 tph to Edinburgh Waverley via Singer and Glasgow Queen Street
- 1 tph to Motherwell via Yoker, Glasgow Central and Whifflet
- 1 tph to Larkhall via Yoker, Glasgow Central and Hamilton Central
- 2 tph to Helensburgh Central
- 2 tph to Balloch
- 3 tpd to Glasgow Queen Street (fast)
- 3 tpd to Oban, of which 2 have a portion which divides at Crianlarich and runs to Mallaig via Fort William

=== Caledonian Sleeper ===
The Highland Sleeper service also calls in each direction daily (except Saturday nights southbound and Sunday mornings northbound), giving the station a direct link to/from London Euston via Edinburgh Waverley, Crewe and the West Coast Main Line, and providing an additional service to Fort William.

Preceding station	National Rail	Following station
Dalmuir	ScotRail; West Highland Line	Helensburgh Upper
Dalmuir	Caledonian Sleeper; Highland Caledonian Sleeper	Helensburgh Upper
Dumbarton East	ScotRail; North Clyde Line	Dalreoch
	Historical railways	
Dumbarton East; Line and Station open	Caledonian; Lanarkshire and Dumbartonshire Railway	Terminus
Bowling; Line closed; Station open	Caledonian & North British Railway; Caledonian and Dumbartonshire Junction Railway	Dalreoch; Line and Station open
