= Bowling railway station (Lanarkshire and Dunbartonshire Railway) =

Disused railway station in Scotland

Bowling
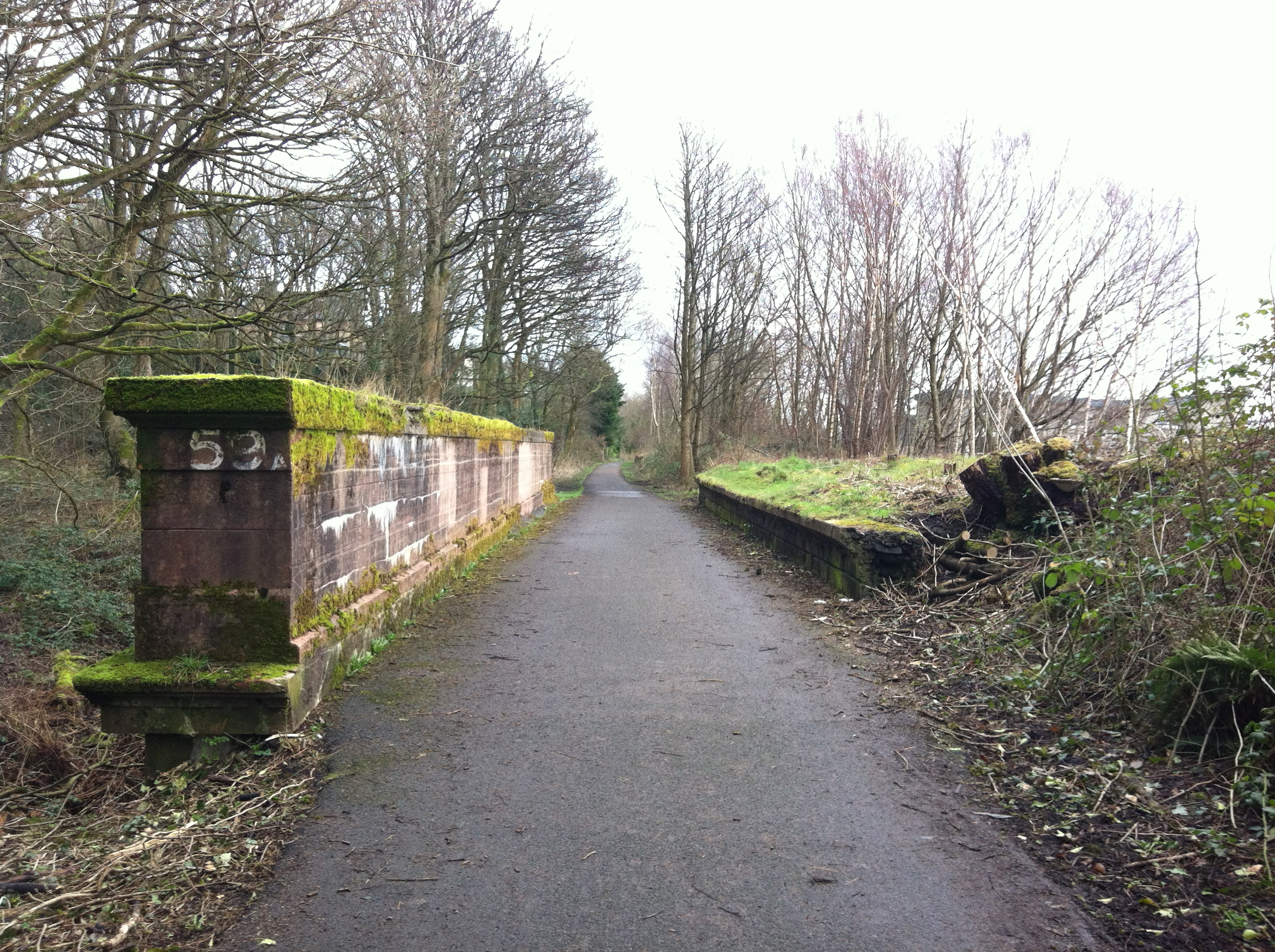
- Platform looking east

General information
- Location: Bowling, West Dunbartonshire; Scotland
- Coordinates: 55.9321°N 4.4892°W
- Platforms: 2

Other information
- Status: Disused

History
- Original company: Lanarkshire and Dunbartonshire Railway
- Pre-grouping: Caledonian Railway
- Post-grouping: London, Midland and Scottish Railway

Key dates
- 1 October 1896: Opened
- 1 January 1917: Closed
- 1 February 1919: Reopened
- 5 February 1951: Closed
Location

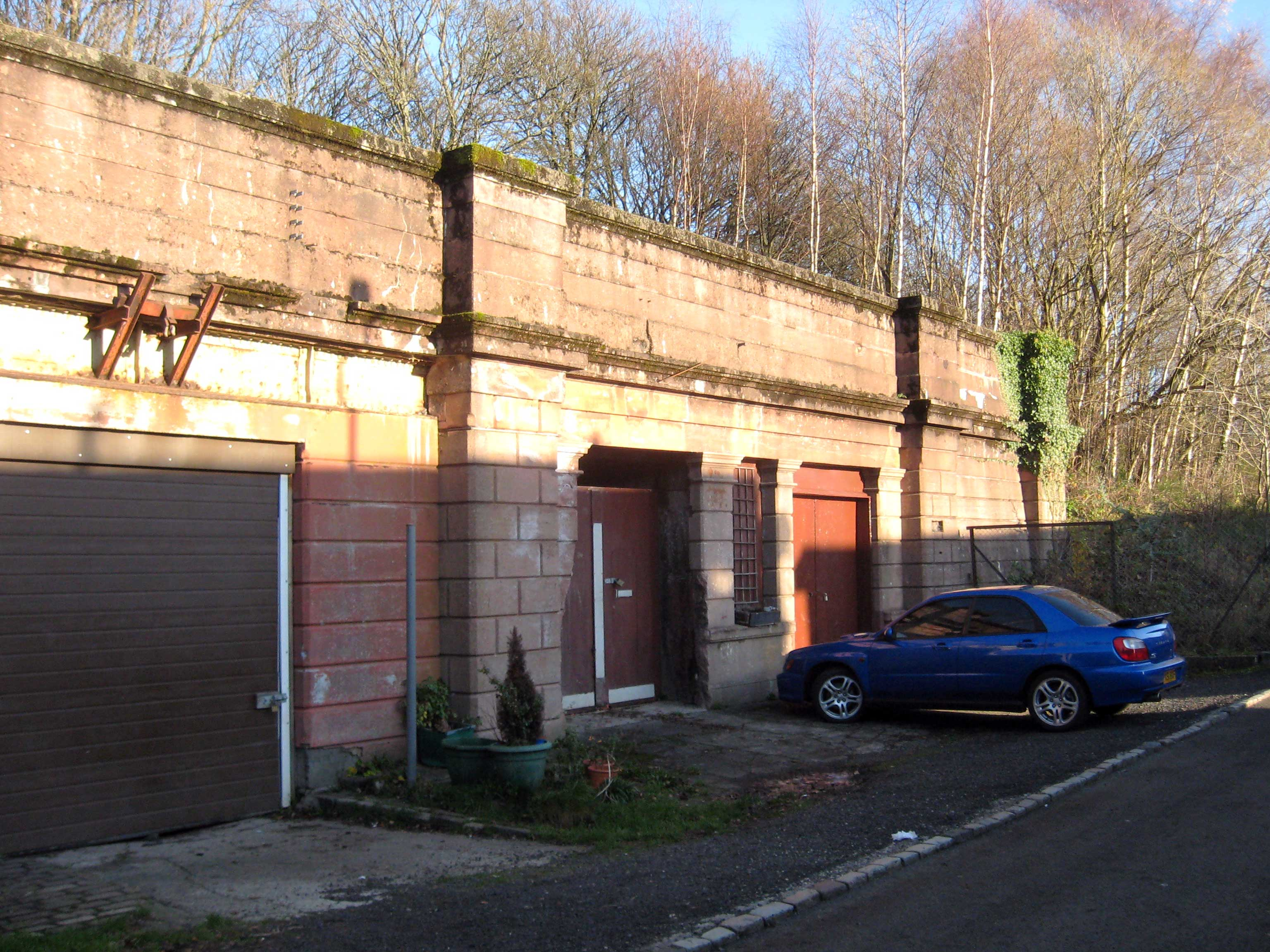
Structure below platform

Bowling railway station was a railway station located in the village of Bowling, Scotland, on the Lanarkshire and Dunbartonshire Railway.

Bowling station was closed in 1951 before this section of the L&DR was abandoned in 1960 (the parallel GH&DR being retained and electrified as part of the North Clyde electrification scheme). The trackbed through Bowling now forms a footpath and cycleway, part of National Cycle Network Route 7.

Preceding station	Historical railways	Following station
Old Kilpatrick; Line and station closed	Caledonian Railway; Lanarkshire and Dunbartonshire Railway	Dumbarton East; Station open; line partially open

== Gallery ==
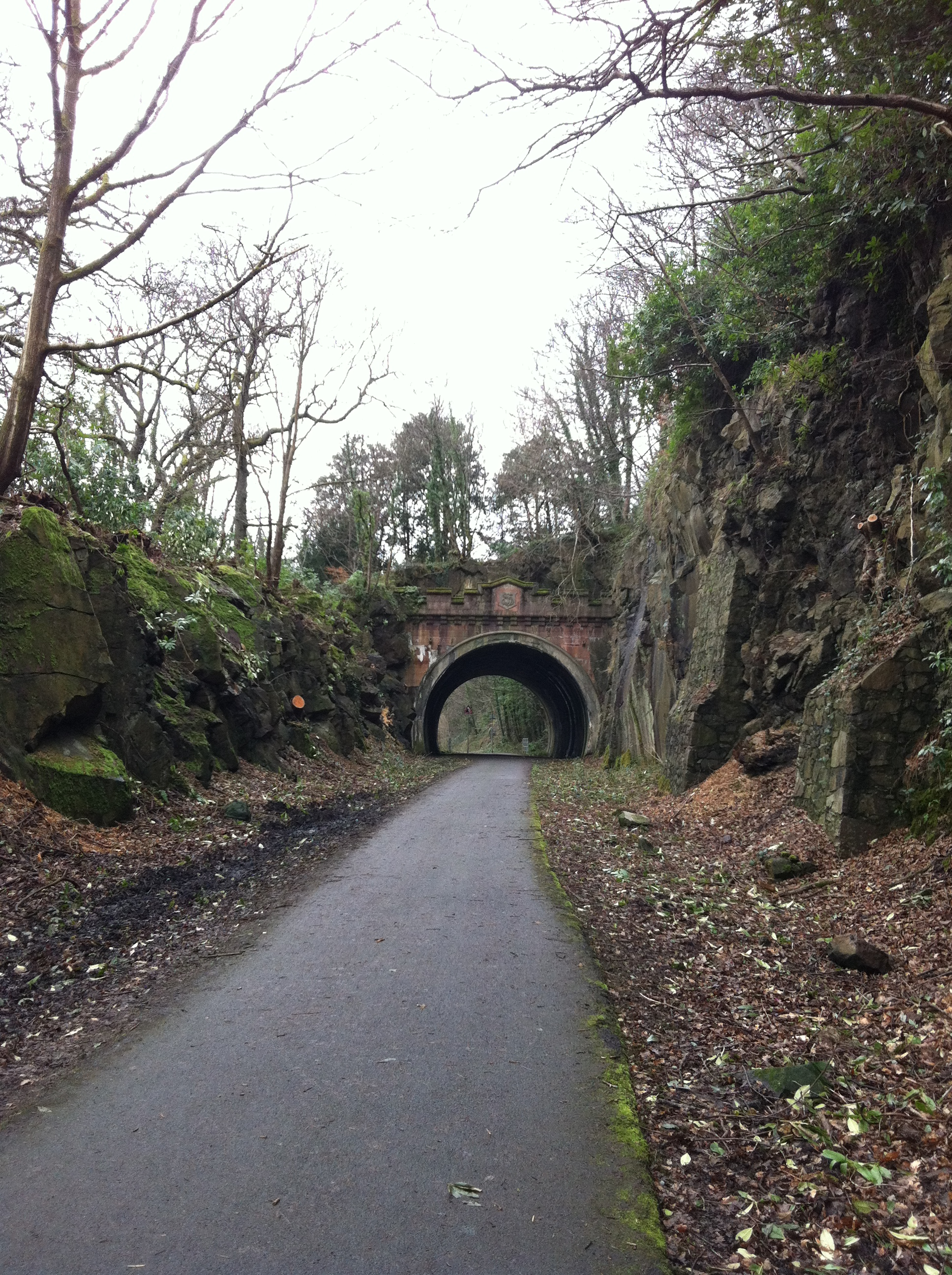
A tunnel to the west of the station.

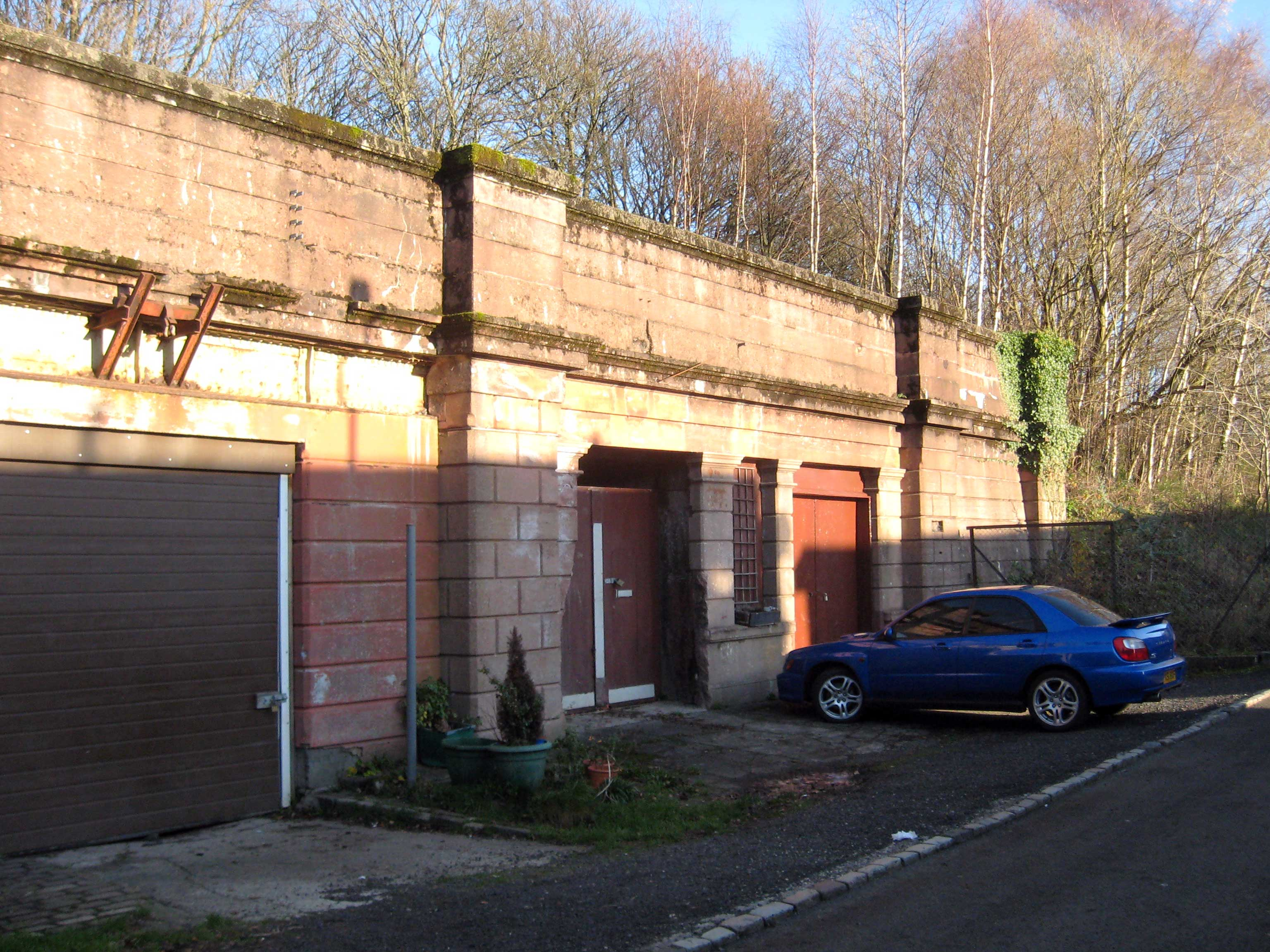
Structure below platform.

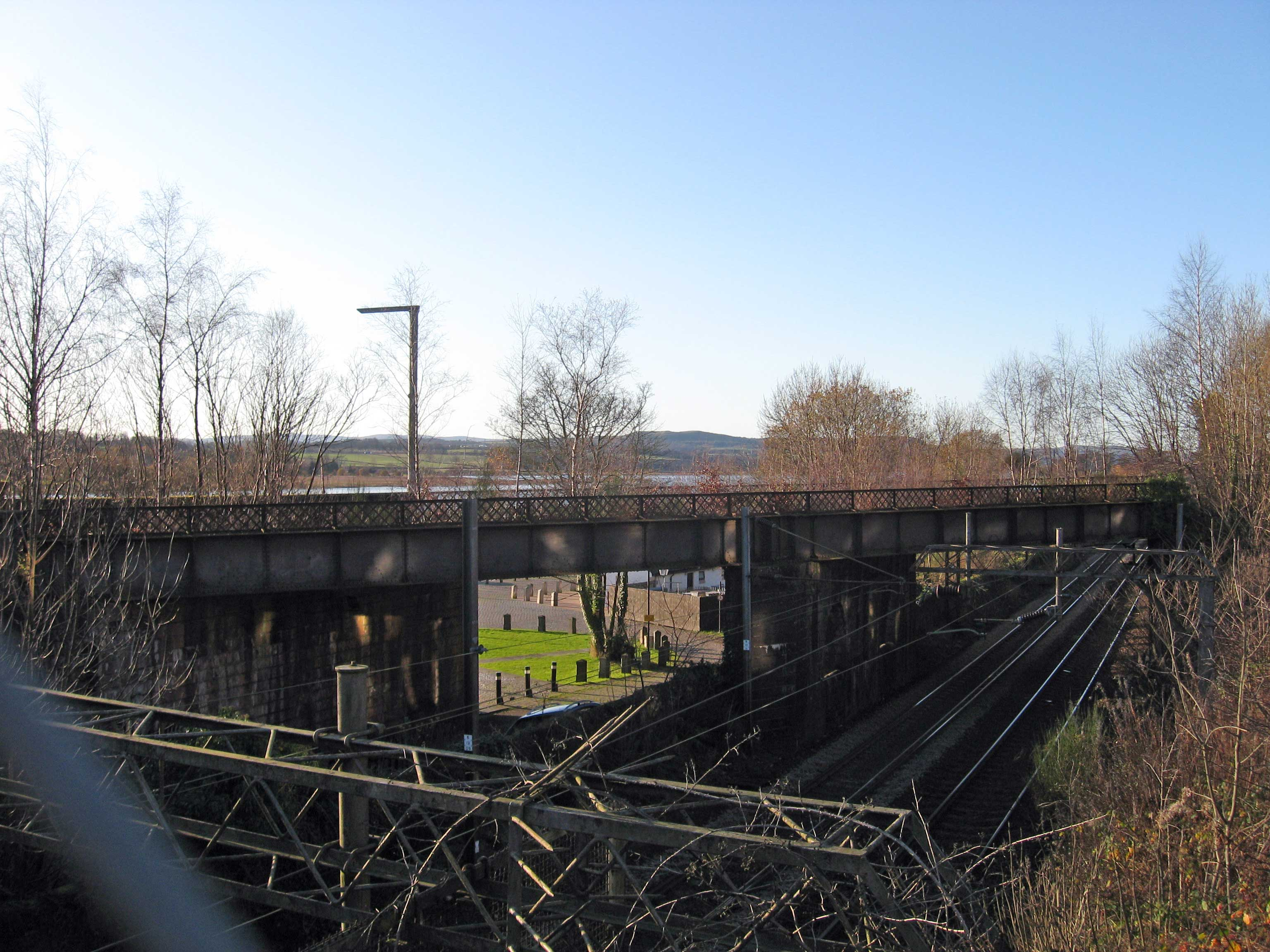
To the east of the station, the former railway line crosses over the North Clyde Line.
