= Bowling railway station =

Railway station in West Dunbartonshire, Scotland

Bowling Scottish Gaelic: Bolan
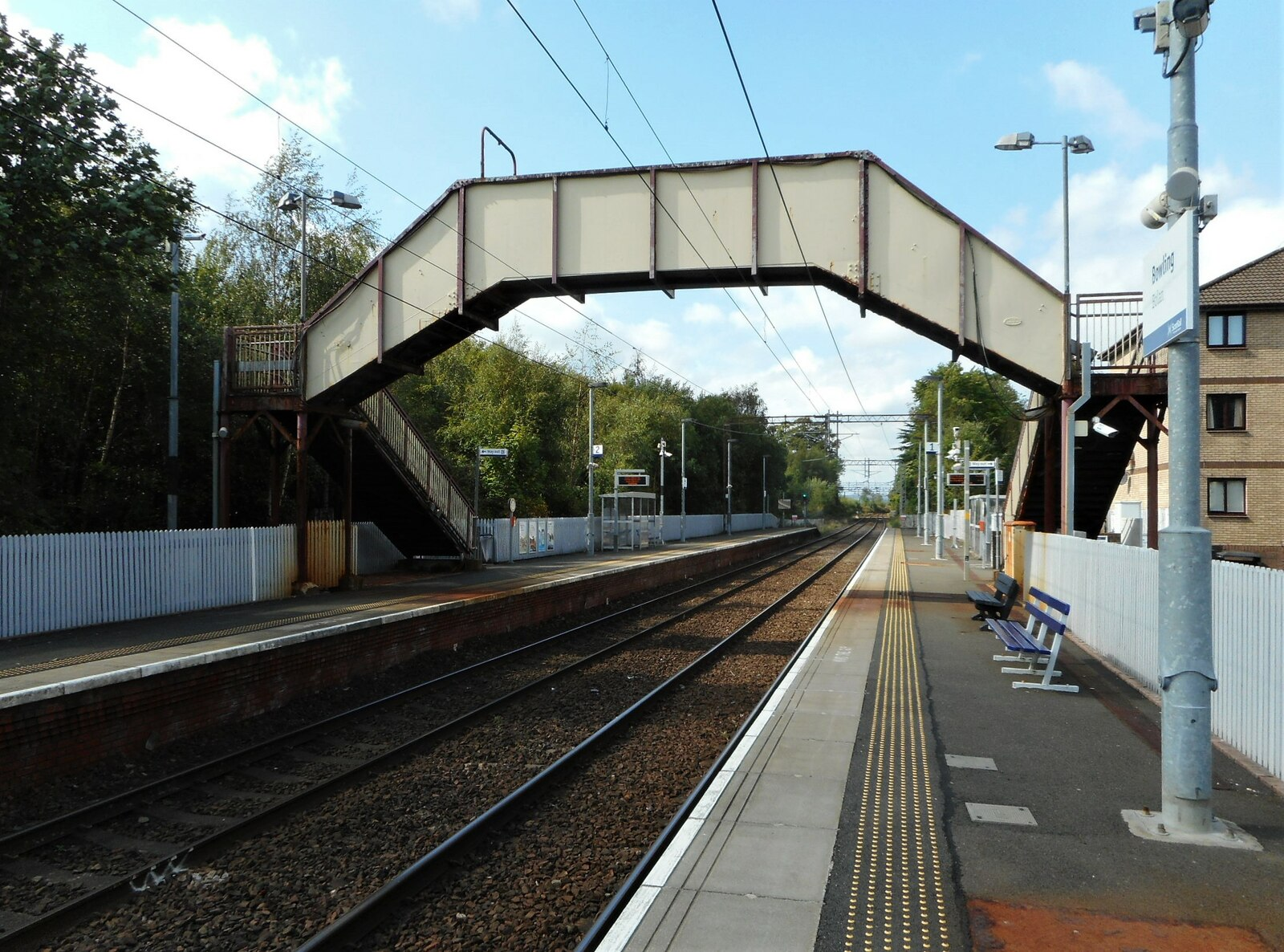

General information
- Location: Bowling, West Dunbartonshire; Scotland
- Coordinates: 55.9311°N 4.4929°W
- Grid reference: NS442736
- Manager: ScotRail
- Transit authority: SPT
- Platforms: 2

Other information
- Station code: BWG

History
- Original company: Caledonian and Dunbartonshire Junction Railway
- Pre-grouping: CR and NBR
- Post-grouping: LMS and LNER

Key dates
- 15 July 1850: Opened
- 31 May 1858: Resited

Passengers
- 2021/22: ▲18,274
- 2022/23: ▲25,434
- 2023/24: ▼24,670
- 2024/25: ▲27,310
- 2025/26: ▲30,146
Location
Notes
- Passenger statistics from the Office of Rail and Road

Bowling railway station serves the village of Bowling in the West Dunbartonshire region of Scotland. This station is on the North Clyde Line, between Kilpatrick and Dumbarton East, 12 miles 70 chains (20.7 km) from Glasgow Queen Street measured via Maryhill. The station is managed by ScotRail who provide all train services.

== History ==
The station was opened on 15 July 1850 by the Glasgow, Dumbarton and Helensburgh Railway, and resited a few years later in 1858.

=== Accidents and incidents ===
On 8 September 1933, a passenger train collided with wagons on the line due to a signalman's error. Five people were injured.

In October 2023, severe flooding took place around the River Clyde following a severe weather warning from the Met Office. The Glasgow Times described the station as being "underwater" while The Herald called the station "inundated with muddy water ...[the] flood rising almost to the platform’s edge".

== Facilities ==
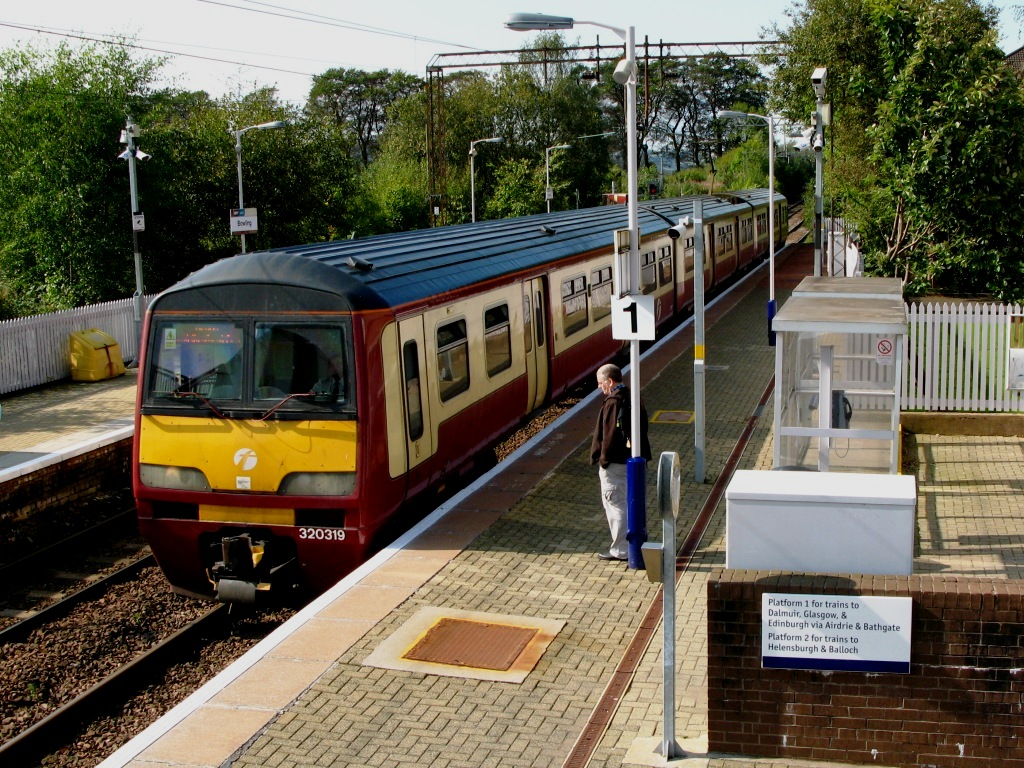
A Class 320 at the station in 2011

The station is unstaffed, and only comprises basic shelters, benches, help points, a payphone and a few cycle stands. As there are no facilities to purchase tickets, passengers must buy one in advance, or from the guard on the train.

== Passenger volume ==
The main origin or destination station for journeys to or from Bowling station in the 2022/23 period was Glasgow Queen Street, making up 5,892 of the 25,434 journeys (23.17%).

Passenger Volume at Bowling
	2002–03	2004–05	2005–06	2006–07	2007–08	2008–09	2009–10	2010–11	2011–12	2012–13	2013–14	2014–15	2015–16	2016–17	2017–18	2018–19	2019–20	2020–21	2021–22	2022–23
Entries and exits	151,079	113,682	129,518	113,598	121,129	96,012	43,916	31,784	32,502	33,948	55,820	55,014	58,878	34,438	43,894	61,326	50,366	5,320	18,274	25,434

The statistics cover twelve month periods that start in April.

== Services ==
The typical off-peak service in trains per hour Mondays to Saturdays is:

- 2 tph to Airdrie via Singer and Glasgow Queen Street
- 2 tph to Balloch

The typical service on Sundays is:

- 1 tph to Motherwell via Yoker, Glasgow Central and Whifflet
- 1 tph to Larkhall via Yoker, Glasgow Central and Hamilton Central
- 2 tph to Balloch

Services to Helensburgh Central and Edinburgh Waverley via Singer, Airdrie, and Bathgate will not call at this station or Kilpatrick station.

Preceding station	National Rail	Following station
Kilpatrick	ScotRail; North Clyde Line	Dumbarton East
	Historical railways	
Kilpatrick; Line and station open	North British Railway; Glasgow, Dumbarton and Helensburgh Railway	Line continues as C&DJR
Line continues as GD&HR	Caledonian & North British Railway; Caledonian and Dunbartonshire Junction Railway	Dumbarton Central; Line closed; Station open

== Cultural references ==
The station was made famous by a 1960 painting by the renowned railway artist, the late Terence Cuneo, who depicted a then new Blue train (Class 303) heading westbound into Bowling, passing a steam engine, which the 303 had replaced, in a siding. The painting was used as a poster 'Glasgow Electric'.

== Bibliography ==
- Brailsford, Martyn, ed. (December 2017) [1987]. Railway Track Diagrams 1: Scotland & Isle of Man (6th ed.). Frome: Trackmaps. ISBN 978-0-9549866-9-8.
- Butt, R. V. J. (October 1995). The Directory of Railway Stations: details every public and private passenger station, halt, platform and stopping place, past and present (1st ed.). Sparkford: Patrick Stephens Ltd. ISBN 978-1-85260-508-7. OCLC 60251199. OL 11956311M.
- Jowett, Alan (March 1989). Jowett's Railway Atlas of Great Britain and Ireland: From Pre-Grouping to the Present Day (1st ed.). Sparkford: Patrick Stephens Ltd. ISBN 978-1-85260-086-0. OCLC 22311137.
- Quick, Michael (2022). Railway Passenger Stations in Great Britain: A Chronology (PDF) (5th ed.). London: Railway and Canal Historical Society.
