= Partick Central railway station =

Former railway station in Scotland

Partick Central
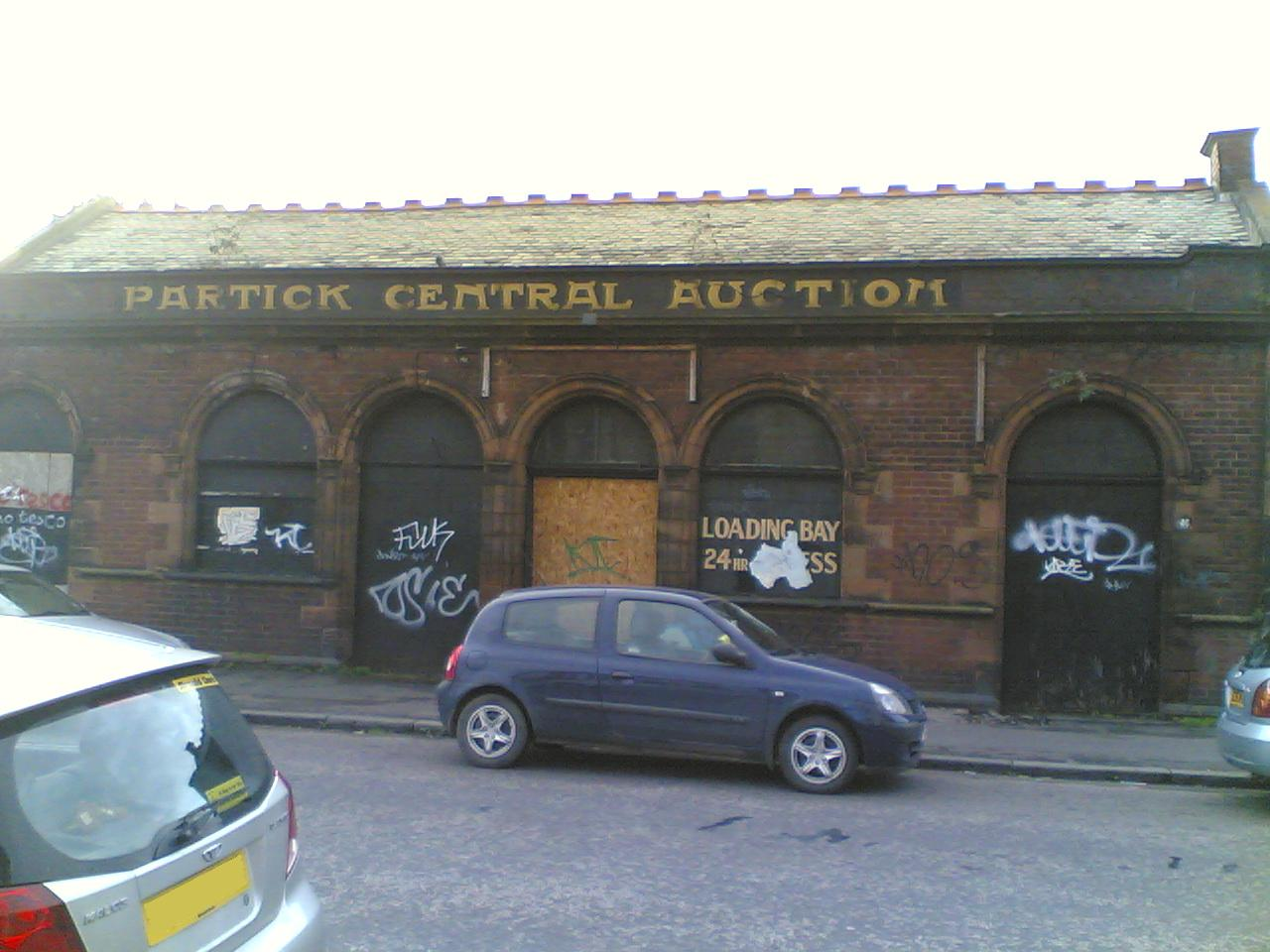
- The former station building for Partick Central, latterly used as an auction house

General information
- Location: Partick, Glasgow; Scotland
- Coordinates: 55.8693°N 4.3007°W
- Platforms: 2

Other information
- Status: Disused

History
- Original company: Lanarkshire and Dunbartonshire Railway
- Pre-grouping: Caledonian Railway
- Post-grouping: LMS

Key dates
- 1 October 1896: Opened
- 15 June 1959: Renamed as Kelvin Hall
- 5 October 1964: Station closed to passengers (line closed to Stobcross)
- 23 October 1978: Station completely closed (freight service from Yoker)
- 28 January 2007: Station building demolished
Location

Partick Central railway station was a station serving the Partick area of the city of Glasgow. Built in the 1890s by the Lanarkshire and Dunbartonshire Railway Company, it sat on a line that ran along the north bank of the River Clyde from Stobcross to Dumbarton.

== History ==
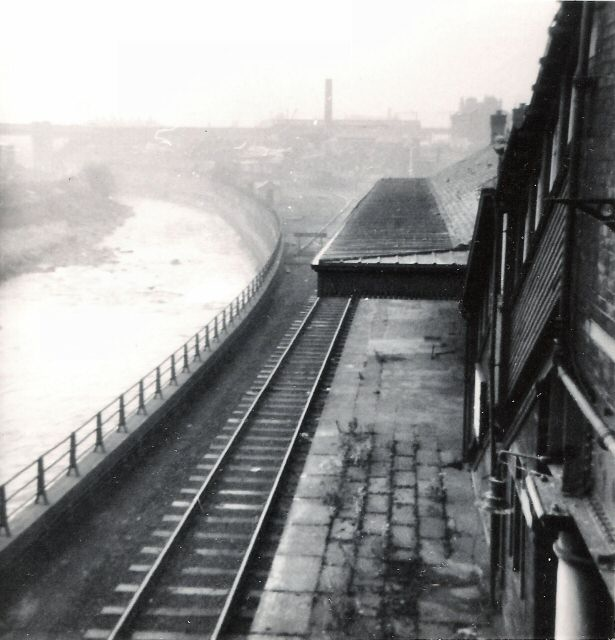
As Kelvin Hall Station, 1966

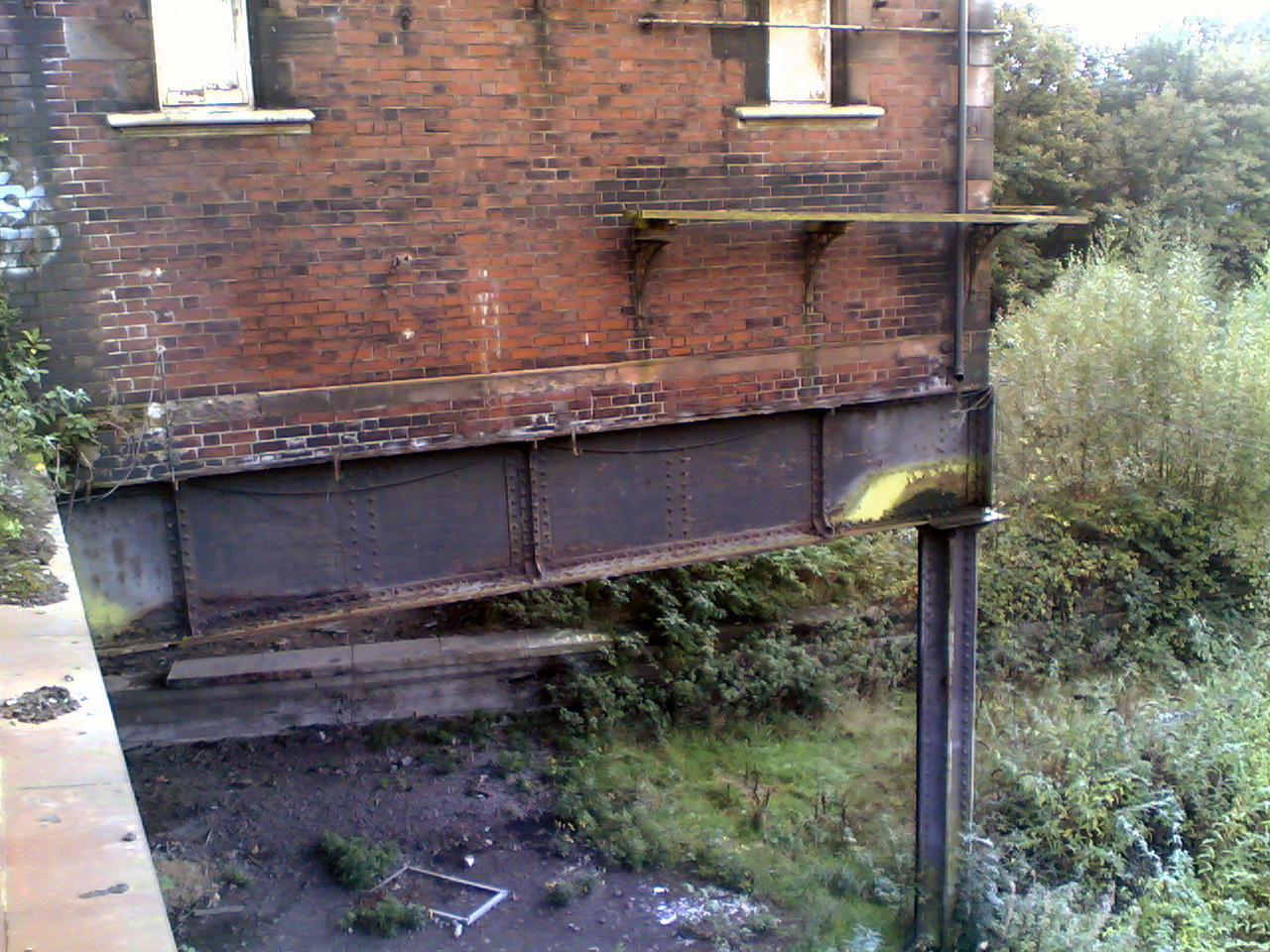
Looking beneath the station building, the trackbed has been lifted but the platform edge remains visible

The station was renamed Kelvin Hall in 1959, as it was in the vicinity of the building of that name, and was close, but not attached to, the Partick Cross station on the Glasgow Subway.

Passenger and goods services to the station ceased in 1964 when it closed as part of the Beeching cuts to rail services across the UK. The station building was later used as a workshop and an auction house before lying empty for a number of years. The remains of the platforms and trackbed, which were underneath the station building, have been removed but the railway's route is fairly discernible. The station's goods yard served as a site for travelling people and as a scrap merchants.

Preceding station	Historical railways	Following station
Stobcross now named Exhibition Centre; Station open; Line partially open	Lanarkshire and Dunbartonshire Railway operated by Caledonian Railway	Partick West; Line and station closed

== Redevelopment of site ==
The site had been empty and awaiting redevelopment when in 2004 it emerged that the supermarket chain Tesco wished to develop a 24-hour operation there, in the face of local opposition. Tesco had the station building demolished on 28 January 2007, before planning permission had been given for the development from Glasgow City Council.

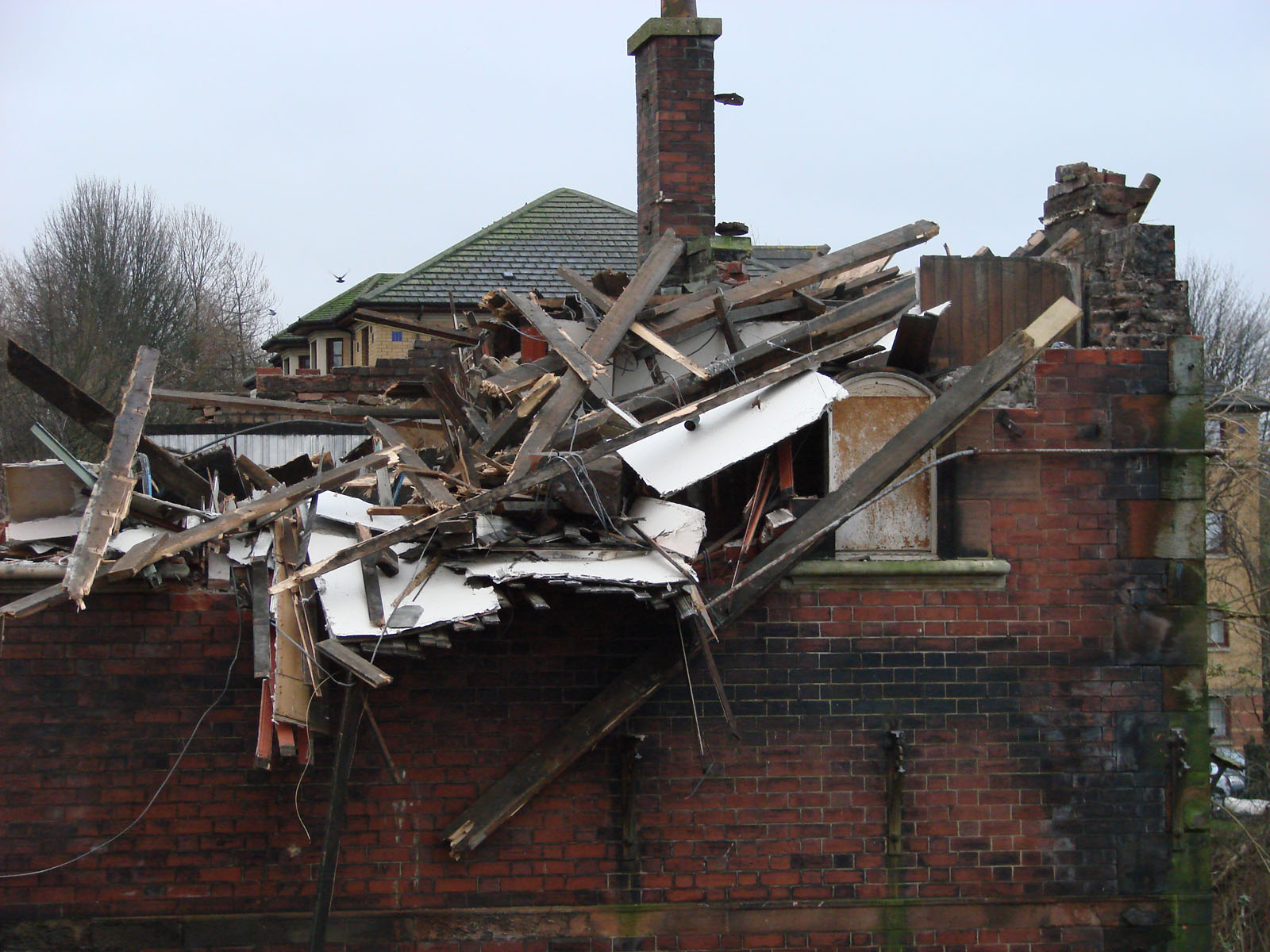
Demolition in progress

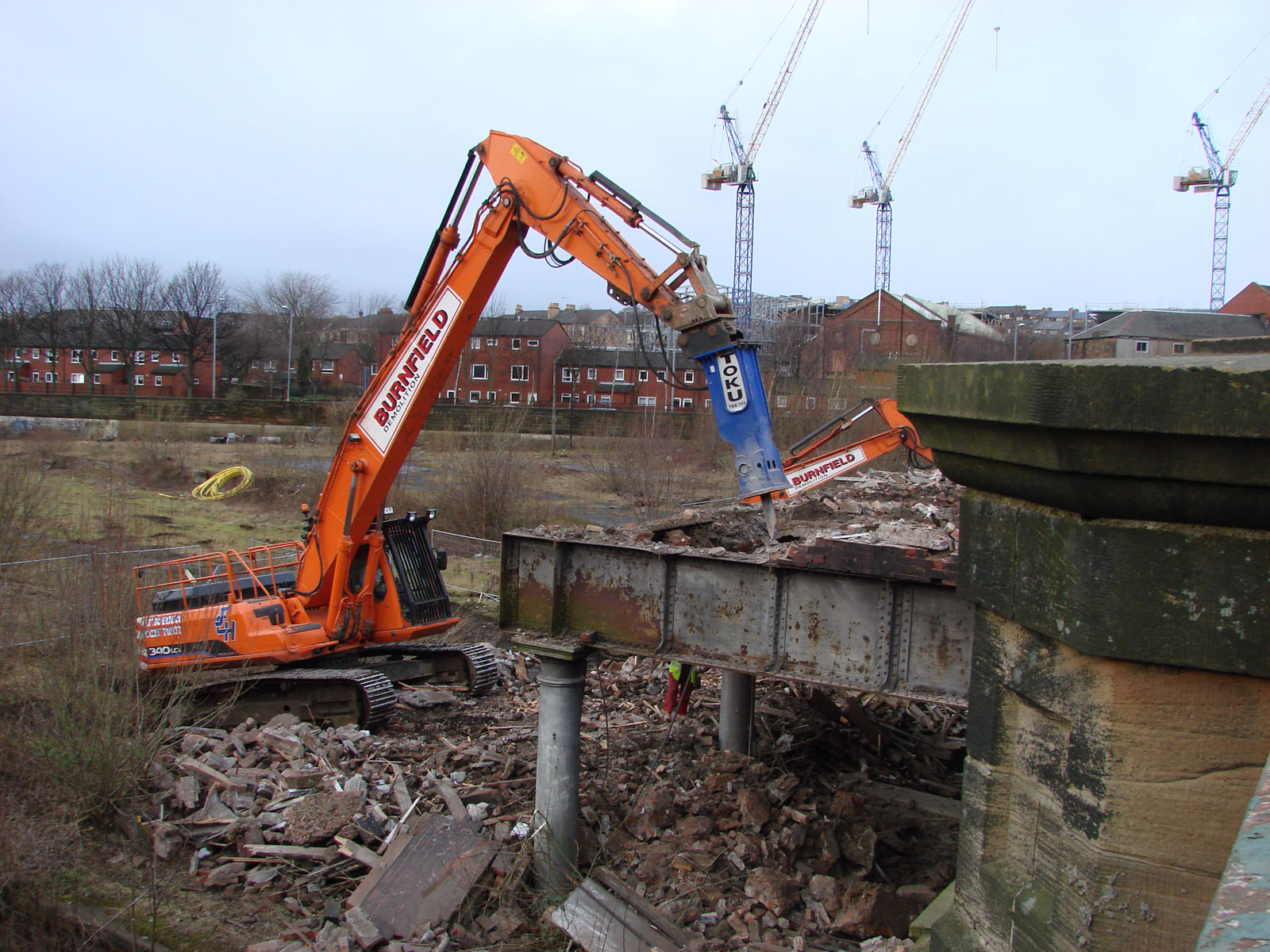
Demolition complete

However, as at 2023 the site is occupied by West Village student accommodation to the west and modern flats to the east.
