= Kilpatrick railway station =

Railway station in West Dunbartonshire, Scotland

Kilpatrick Scottish Gaelic: Cill Phàdraig
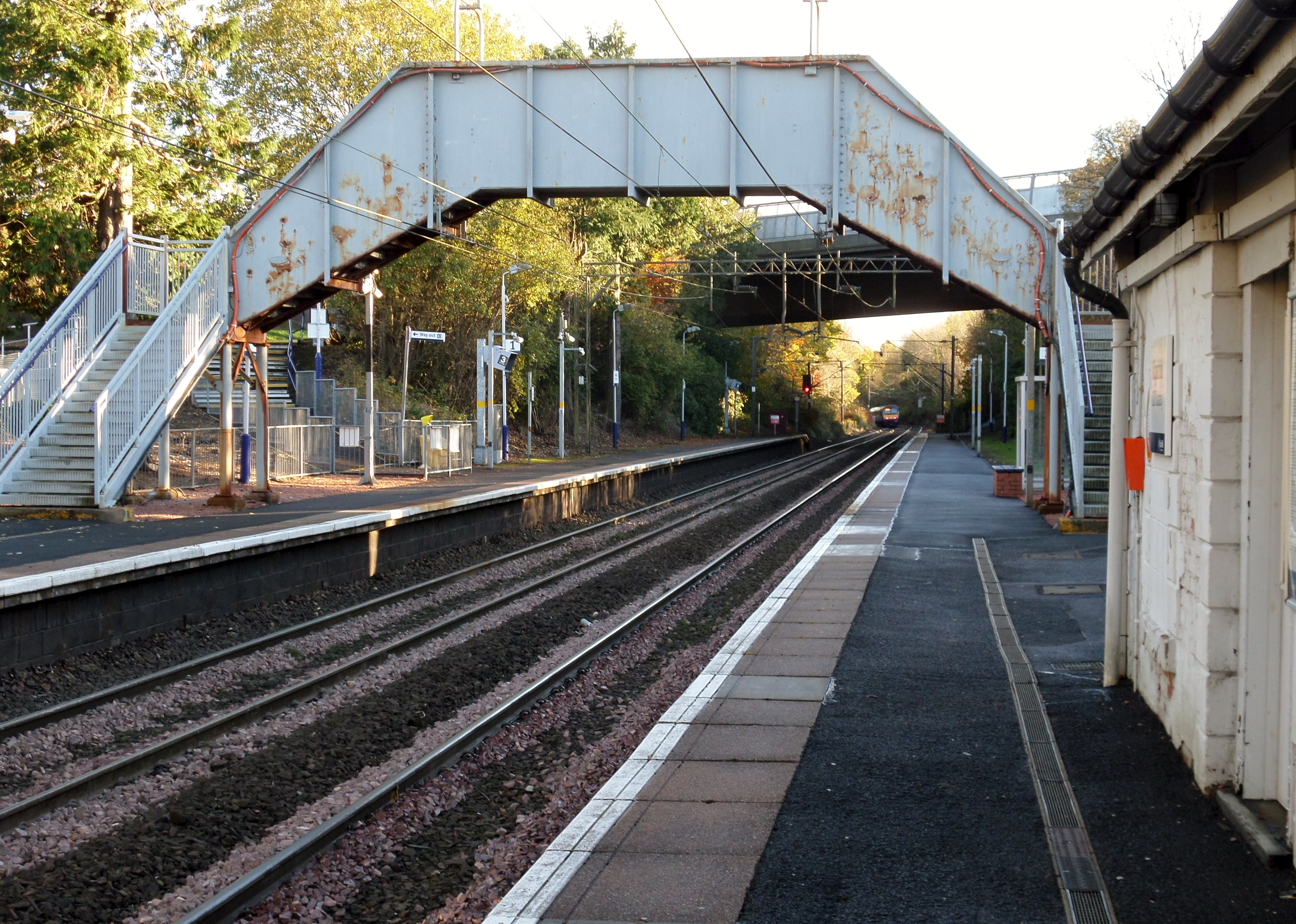
- Kilpatrick railway station, looking southeast towards Dalmuir. The Erskine Bridge can be seen overhead.

General information
- Location: Old Kilpatrick, West Dunbartonshire; Scotland
- Coordinates: 55.9239°N 4.4525°W
- Grid reference: NS468728
- Manager: ScotRail
- Transit authority: SPT
- Platforms: 2

Other information
- Station code: KPT

Key dates
- 31 May or 7 June 1858: Opened

Passengers
- 2021/22: ▲48,198
- 2022/23: ▲66,432
- 2023/24: ▲70,598
- 2024/25: ▲76,814
- 2025/26: ▲78,184
Location
Notes
- Passenger statistics from the Office of Rail and Road

Kilpatrick railway station serves the village of Old Kilpatrick in the West Dunbartonshire region of Scotland. The station is managed by ScotRail and is on the North Clyde Line, between Dalmuir and Bowling. It is situated 11 miles 17 chains (18.0 km) from Glasgow Queen Street, measured via Maryhill.

== Facilities ==
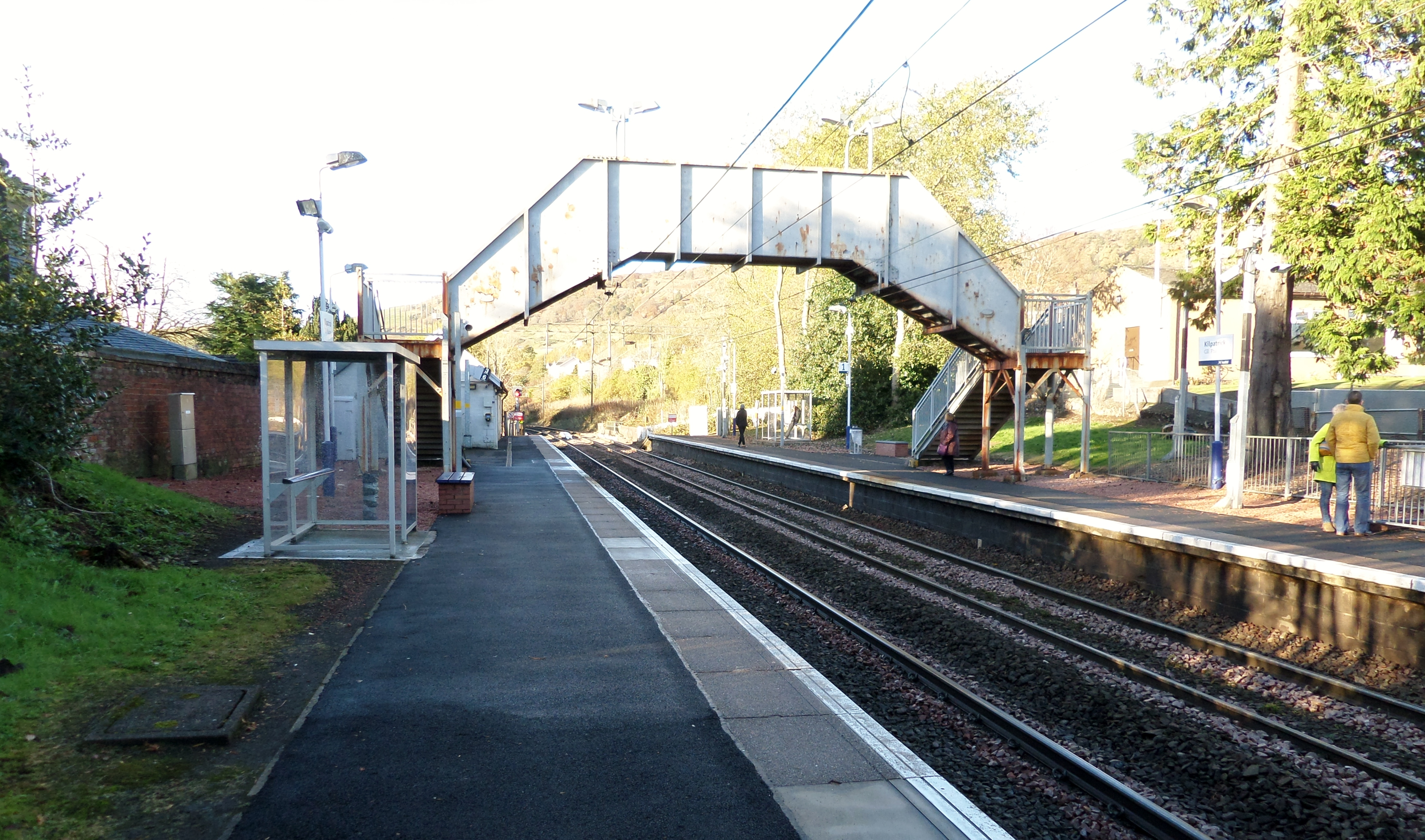
The station seen in 2016, looking west

The station is a split, two-platform station with ramp access. There are shelters and help points on both platforms, with a set of bike racks on one side. As there are no facilities to purchase tickets, passengers must buy one in advance, or from the guard on the train.

A woman was killed in an apparent suicide here, being struck by a train in October 2011 at the station.

== Passenger volume ==
Passenger Volume at Kilpatrick
	2002–03	2004–05	2005–06	2006–07	2007–08	2008–09	2009–10	2010–11	2011–12	2012–13	2013–14	2014–15	2015–16	2016–17	2017–18	2018–19	2019–20	2020–21	2021–22	2022–23
Entries and exits	56,646	63,977	68,119	71,200	75,356	80,562	107,494	119,212	119,406	118,518	125,306	128,482	135,178	128,918	124,860	104,354	103,968	15,420	48,198	66,432

The statistics cover twelve month periods that start in April.

== Services ==
As of March 2025, the typical off-peak service in trains per hour Mondays to Saturdays is:

- 2 tph to Airdrie via Singer and Glasgow Queen Street
- 2 tph to Balloch

The typical service on Sundays is:

- 1 tph to Motherwell via Yoker, Glasgow Central and Whifflet
- 1 tph to Larkhall via Yoker, Glasgow Central and Hamilton Central
- 2 tph to Balloch

Preceding station	National Rail	Following station
Dalmuir	ScotRail; North Clyde Line	Bowling
	Historical railways	
Dalmuir; Line and station open	Glasgow, Dumbarton and Helensburgh Railway	Bowling; Line and station open

== Sources ==
- Brailsford, Martyn, ed. (December 2017) [1987]. Railway Track Diagrams 1: Scotland & Isle of Man (6th ed.). Frome: Trackmaps. ISBN 978-0-9549866-9-8.
- Butt, R. V. J. (October 1995). The Directory of Railway Stations: details every public and private passenger station, halt, platform and stopping place, past and present (1st ed.). Sparkford: Patrick Stephens Ltd. ISBN 978-1-85260-508-7. OCLC 60251199. OL 11956311M.
- Jowett, Alan (March 1989). Jowett's Railway Atlas of Great Britain and Ireland: From Pre-Grouping to the Present Day (1st ed.). Sparkford: Patrick Stephens Ltd. ISBN 978-1-85260-086-0. OCLC 22311137.
- Quick, Michael (2022). Railway Passenger Stations in Great Britain: A Chronology (PDF) (5th ed.). London: Railway and Canal Historical Society.
