= Garscadden railway station =

Railway station in Glasgow, Scotland

Garscadden Scottish Gaelic: Gart Sgadain
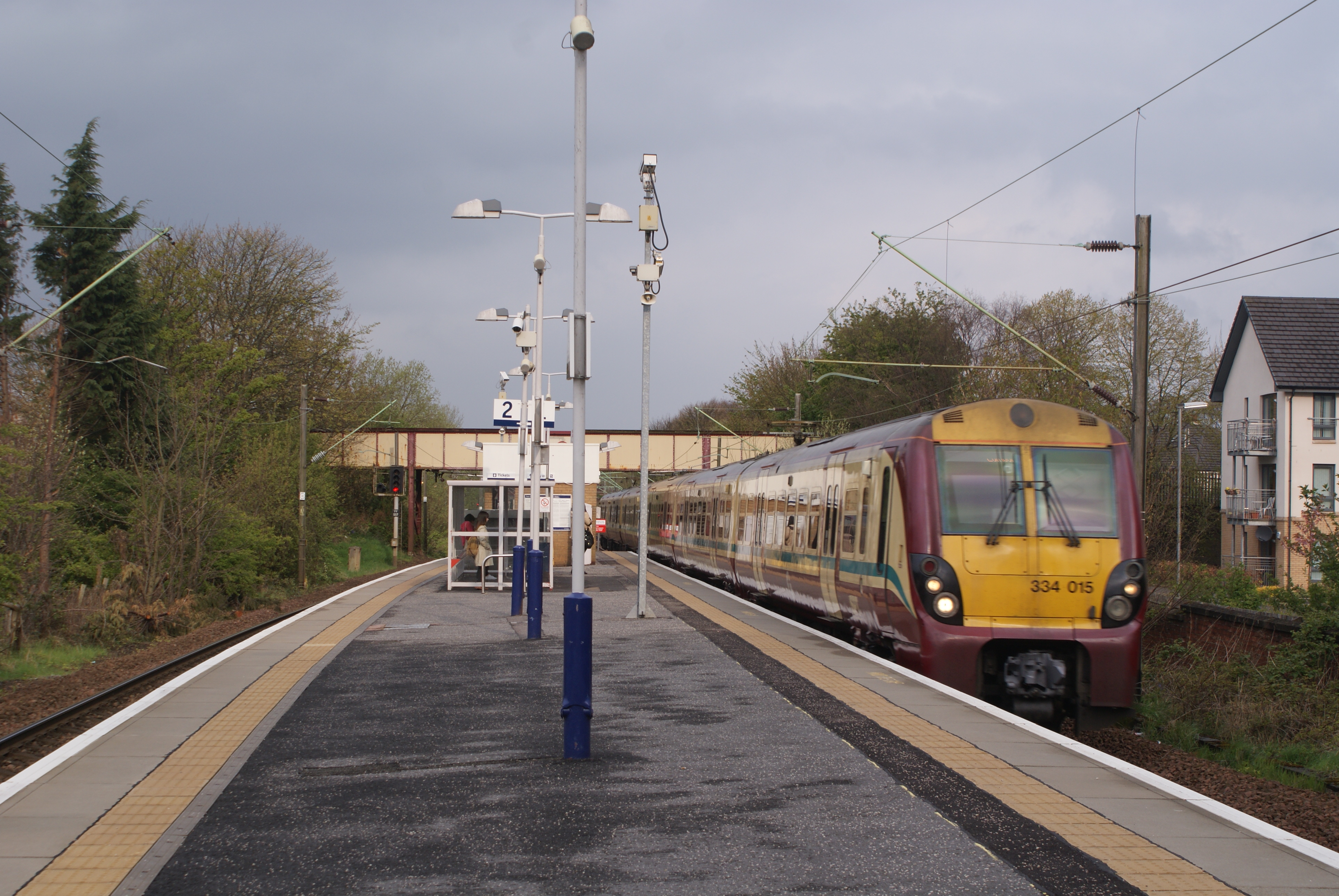
- A Class 334 at Garscadden station

General information
- Location: Garscadden, Glasgow; Scotland
- Coordinates: 55.8874°N 4.3638°W
- Grid reference: NS521685
- Manager: ScotRail
- Platforms: 2

Other information
- Station code: GRS

Key dates
- 5 November 1960: Opened

Passengers
- 2021/22: ▲0.119 million
- 2022/23: ▲0.150 million
- 2023/24: ▲0.193 million
- 2024/25: ▲0.218 million
- 2025/26: ▲0.233 million
Location
Notes
- Passenger statistics from the Office of Rail and Road

Garscadden railway station serves Garscadden in Glasgow, Scotland. The station is managed by ScotRail and lies on the Argyle Line.

== History ==
The station is located on the former Glasgow, Yoker and Clydebank Railway, between Hyndland and Dalmuir which opened in 1882 (though through services to Dalmuir did not start until 1897, when the company was also taken over by the North British Railway). The station here though wasn't opened until 5 November 1960 by British Rail, as part of the North Clyde Line modernisation and electrification scheme.

== Services ==
The station is served by trains between Dalmuir, Yoker and Partick, which then continue into both main Glasgow stations. There are also peak-hour-only services beginning and terminating at Garscadden, mostly on the Argyle Line (via Glasgow Central Low Level). These enter service (or leave service after terminating here) from the adjacent Yoker TMD reception sidings.

The eastbound service pattern consists of four trains per hour. Two of these services travel via Whifflet, with one terminating at Whifflet and the other continuing to Motherwell, these provide a half-hourly service on the Whifflet Line.

The remaining two services travel via Hamilton Central, with one terminating at Motherwell and the other extending to Cumbernauld, these also operate at half-hourly intervals.

Westbound, two services originate at Larkhall, one starts at Motherwell and travels via Whifflet, and the final service begins at Whifflet.

The service on Sundays is provided by the Balloch to Larkhall (hourly) or Motherwell via Whifflet (hourly) trains.

Preceding station	National Rail	Following station
Scotstounhill	ScotRail; Argyle Line	Yoker
Scotstounhill	ScotRail; North Clyde Line	Yoker
