= Garscadden =

District of Glasgow, Scotland

Coordinates: 55.886861°N 4.366265°W

Garscadden: Scottish Gaelic: Gart Sgadan
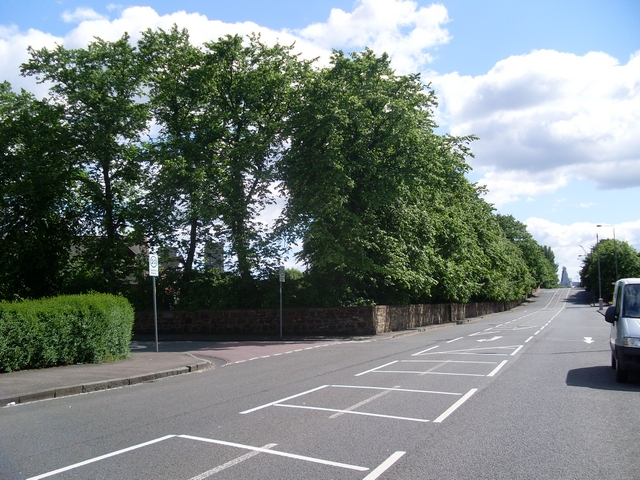
- Corner of Dyke Road and Holehouse Drive

- Location within Glasgow
- OS grid reference: NS521685
- Council area: Glasgow City Council
- Lieutenancy area: Glasgow
- Country: Scotland
- Sovereign state: United Kingdom
- Post town: GLASGOW
- Postcode district: G14
- Dialling code: 0141
- Police: Scotland
- Fire: Scottish
- Ambulance: Scottish
- UK Parliament: Glasgow West
- Scottish Parliament: Glasgow Anniesland

Garscadden (/ɡɑːrˈskædən/; Scottish Gaelic: Gart Sgadan) is a district in the Scottish city of Glasgow. It is situated north of the River Clyde. It lies between Yoker to the west, Scotstoun to the east and Knightswood to the north. It has a train station close to Knightswood shopping centre and Yoker Railway Depot.

Garscadden railway station is on the Argyle Line.
