= Yoker railway station =

Railway station in West Dunbartonshire, Scotland

Yoker Scottish Gaelic: An Eochair
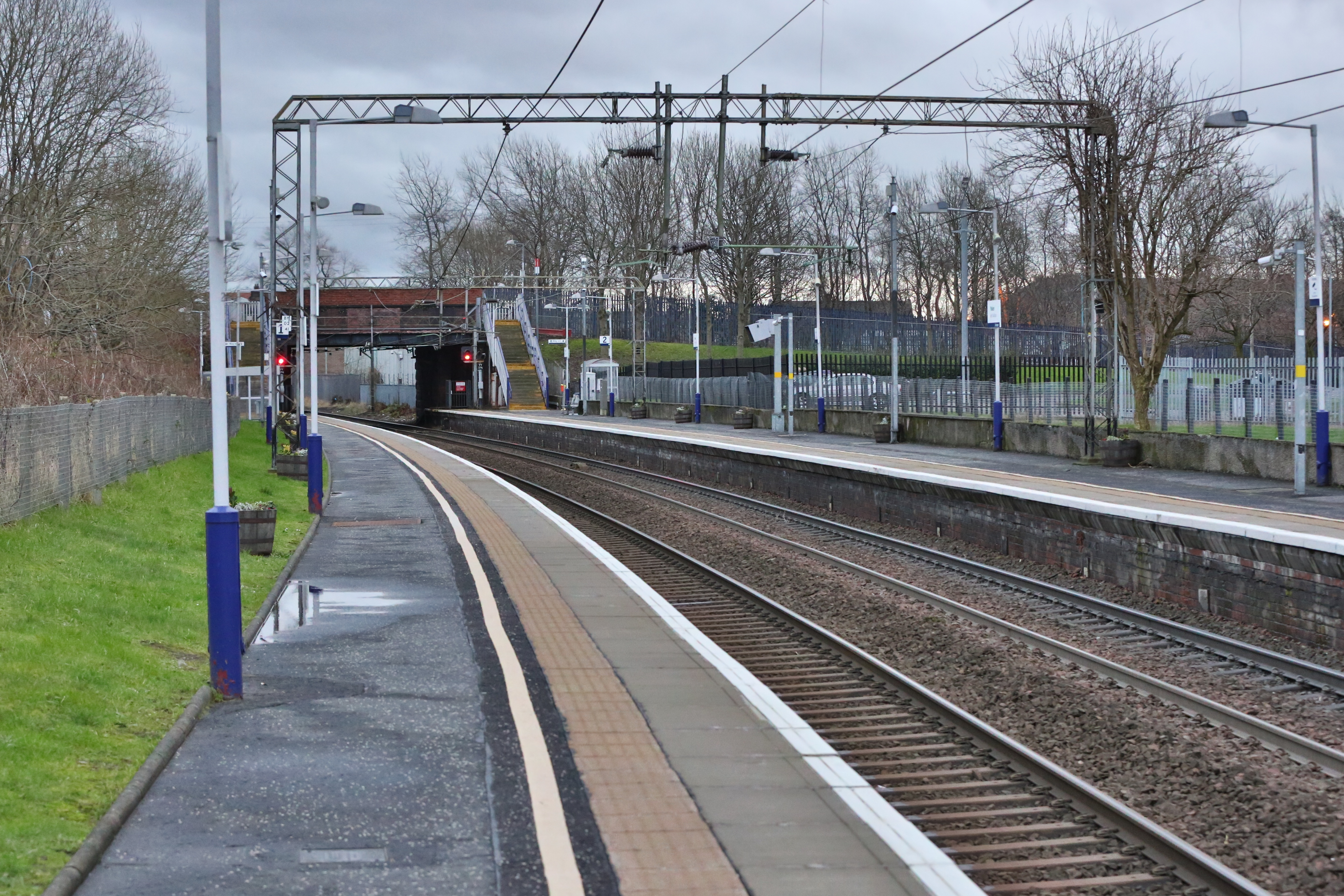
- Looking east towards Garscadden

General information
- Location: Yoker, West Dunbartonshire; Scotland
- Coordinates: 55.8929°N 4.3873°W
- Grid reference: NS508691
- Manager: ScotRail
- Transit authority: Strathclyde Partnership for Transport
- Platforms: 2

Other information
- Station code: YOK

Key dates
- 1882: Opened

Passengers
- 2021/22: ▲0.109 million
- 2022/23: ▲0.138 million
- 2023/24: ▲0.178 million
- 2024/25: ▲0.202 million
- 2025/26: ▲0.231 million
Location
Notes
- Passenger statistics from the Office of Rail and Road

Yoker railway station serves the district of Yoker, Scotland.

The station is served by ScotRail as part of the SPT network, on the Argyle and North Clyde Lines.

It is the nearest railway station to the Renfrew Ferry, and also the closest to the recently opened Renfrew Bridge on the north bank of the River Clyde.

The large Yoker Traction Maintenance Depot, which looks after the EMU fleet used on North Clyde suburban services, is a short distance to the east, towards Garscadden. Yoker IECC is also nearby - this has controlled the signalling on the entire North Clyde network since established by British Rail in 1989.

== Services ==
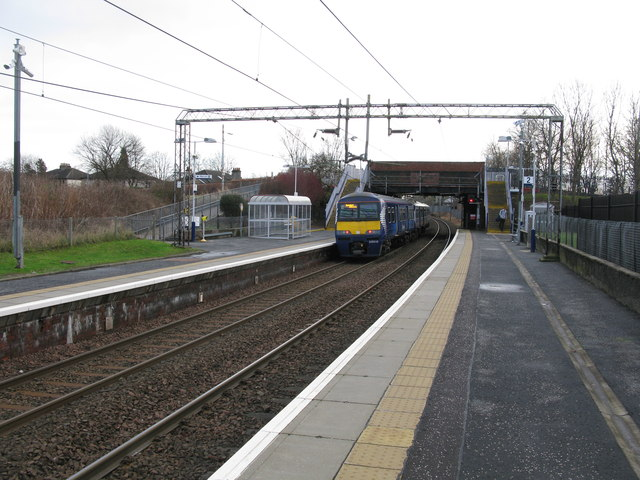
A Class 320 at Yoker

As of the May 2026 timetable, the station receives 4 trains per hour (tph) in each direction from Monday-Saturday, which is roughly halved on Sundays.

The majority of westbound services terminate at Dalmuir, however some late-night services, as well as all services on a Sunday, are extended to Balloch via Dumbarton Central.

Eastbound services run via Partick (for connections to the Glasgow Subway) and Glasgow Central Low Level to Whifflet (2tph, one of which is extended to Motherwell) and Motherwell via Hamilton Central (2tph, one of which is extended to Cumbernauld via Coatbridge Central). On Sundays, the service pattern is 1tph to Motherwell via Whifflet and 1tph to Larkhall via Hamilton Central.

In the early mornings and late evenings, a small number of services run to Rutherglen, Carstairs, Springburn and Edinburgh.

Many services between Edinburgh and Helensburgh Central pass through the station without stopping.

Preceding station	National Rail	Following station
Garscadden	ScotRail; Argyle Line	Clydebank
Garscadden	ScotRail; North Clyde Line	Clydebank
