= Lanarkshire and Dumbartonshire Railway =

Former railway line in Scotland

Overview
- Locale: Scotland
- Dates of operation: 5 August 1891–1 August 1909
- Successor: Caledonian Railway

Technical
- Track gauge: 1,435 mm (4 ft 8 1/2 in)

The Lanarkshire and Dumbartonshire Railway was a railway company in Scotland. It was promoted independently but supported by the Caledonian Railway, and it was designed to connect Balloch (on Loch Lomond) and Dumbarton with central Glasgow, linking in heavy industry on the north bank of the River Clyde. From Dumbarton to Balloch the line would have closely duplicated an existing railway, and negotiation led to the latter being made jointly operated, and the L&DR terminated immediately east of Dumbarton, trains continuing on the joint section.

Since the twentieth century the county is now spelled Dunbartonshire, but at the time of formation of the company, Dumbartonshire was in common use, and that is the spelling the company adopted.

The line opened progressively from 1894 to 1896. It was very successful in attracting goods traffic from heavy industry on Clydeside, and in carrying workers to and from their places of work. This was enhanced by the connection to the Glasgow Central Railway.

Heavy industry declined after 1950 and passenger and goods use of the line declined similarly, and the British Railways modernisation plan proposed electrification and upgrading of the parallel former North British Railway route, and closure of the former L&DR line. The electrification was commissioned in 1960 and the L&DR route closed in 1964 except for a short section near Dumbarton.

== History ==
=== The Caledonian and Dumbartonshire Junction Railway ===
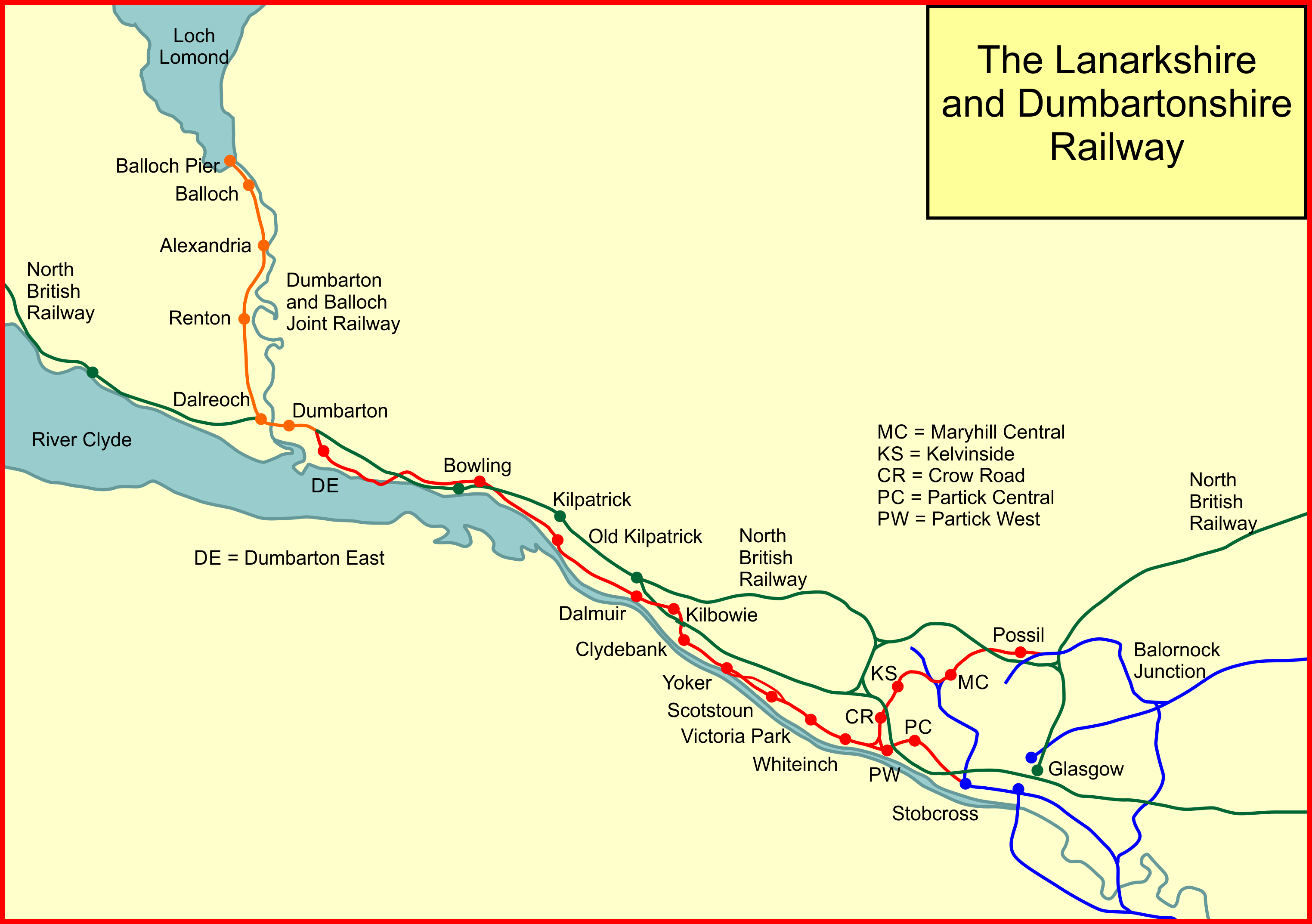
System map of the Lanarkshire and Dumbarton Railway

The Caledonian Railway was authorised in 1845 to build its trunk line from Glasgow and Edinburgh to Carlisle: that line opened in 1847 - 1848. During the lengthy period of planning the route and obtaining its Act of Parliament, the Caledonian set about gaining control of other Scottish railway companies. Many other lines were being promoted at that time of easy availability of capital, and the Caledonian quickly secured the Glasgow, Paisley and Greenock Railway and agreed leases of several other lines, mostly north of the central belt.

There was much industry in the valley of the River Leven and at Dumbarton itself, and independent promoters put forward a line that would run from Glasgow to Dumbarton and Balloch. The connection in Glasgow was to be with the Edinburgh and Glasgow Railway (E&GR) near Cowlairs, broadly following the present-day Westerton route. In 1846 the line obtained an authorising Act of Parliament; it was to be called the Caledonian and Dumbartonshire Junction Railway (C&DJR). (Note: The use of "Caledonian" in the title appears to have referred to Scotland rather than the trunk railway.)

The Caledonian expressed interest in the line and offered to lease the line on its completion, and subscribed to some shares. The C&DJR decided that the Caledonian Railway would be a better partner than the E&GR, and in 1847 successfully presented another Bill to Parliament, proposing an alteration of the terminal in Glasgow so as to connect with the Caledonian.

In fact the G&DJR had serious trouble raising capital, and only succeeded in constructing its line from Bowling through Dumbarton to Balloch. The terminal at Bowling was at the basin of the Forth and Clyde Canal; the canal was in the process of being acquired by the Caledonian Railway at the time. The G&DJR opened in 1850.

=== The Glasgow, Dumbarton and Helensburgh Railway ===
Money for railway construction had been difficult to come by, but the situation eased after 1850 and the attraction of connecting Dumbarton to Glasgow resulted in a new proposal: the Glasgow, Dumbarton and Helensburgh Railway. This was authorised in 1855 and opened in 1858. It connected end on to the C&DJR at Bowling, and extended from Dalreoch to Helensburgh. The C&DJR formed the central section of the route, and a revenue apportioning system was agreed. The company was taken over by the Edinburgh and Glasgow Railway in 1862 and that company formed part of the North British Railway in 1865.

The line ran from Glasgow to Bowling on the north side of the River Clyde, but at some distance from the shore. In the years following the construction, industry developed with increasing intensity close to the shore, especially at Yoker and Clydebank. As navigation on the Clyde was improved, larger port facilities were developed, and the Queens Dock was opened in 1880 at Stobcross (now the location of the Scottish Exhibition and Conference Centre). The North British Railway built a branch to the dock.

=== The Glasgow Central Railway ===
In 1888 the Glasgow Central Railway was authorised; supported by the Caledonian Railway, it was to run from Dalmarnock to Maryhill through the centre of Glasgow, with a low level station under Glasgow Central, and making a connection at Stobcross to the extensive dock sidings there. The line was prodigiously difficult to construct, and it did not open throughout until 1896. It was heavily used for suburban passenger purposes, but also by goods trains to and from the dock.

=== The Lanarkshire and Dumbartonshire Railway approved ===
The Caledonian Railway had no access to any of the industry and dock sites on the north bank of the Clyde west of Stobcross (except at the Bowling canal basin of the Forth and Clyde Canal, having bought out the canal in 1853). The company used a variant spelling of 'Dunbartonshire'.

Lanarkshire and Dumbartonshire Railway Act 1891
- Act of Parliament
- Parliament of the United Kingdom
- Long title: An Act to authorise the construction of a Railway from the Caledonian Railway at Glasgow to Dumbarton with subsidiary lines and other works in connexion therewith and for other purposes.
- Citation: 54 & 55 Vict. c. cci

Dates
- Royal assent: 5 August 1891

Text of statute as originally enacted

In 1891 a bill was submitted to Parliament for the Lanarkshire and Dumbartonshire Railway (L&DR). It was nominally independent, although promoted with heavy Caledonian support, and the authorising act, the Lanarkshire and Dumbartonshire Railway Act 1891 (54 & 55 Vict. c. cci) was passed on 5 August.

Coming later than the urban development of the city, the line was forced to take a circuitous route with several tunnel sections to penetrate the hilly topography. The Glasgow Central Railway joined the Caledonian on the south side, but the L&DR was to spring from junctions at Balornock, near Provanmill on the line out of the Buchanan Street terminus, on the north-east side of the city. A branch from Balornock to Hamiltonhill had been promoted in 1883; intended to serve iron foundries and other industry along the route of the Forth and Clyde Canal there. The route arched round north of Springburn Park, but land acquisition problems prevented the line from being completed at Hamiltonhill. The L&DR route was now to use the first part of the Hamiltonhill line as far as Possil, then continuing west and crossing under the River Kelvin to a new through station at Maryhill, joining the Glasgow Central Railway near there, giving onward access to Stobcross.

From Maryhill the L&DR continued west and then south in tunnel to a triangular junction near the bank of the Clyde. An eastward arm led through Partick to the Stobcross station of the Central line; the westward arm continued close to the river through Scotstoun and Yoker, serving numerous industrial sites, then looping north at Clydebank. Crossing over and then under the North British line, it continued between the Forth and Clyde Canal and the Clyde to Bowling, where it crossed to the north of the canal and the NBR line, then looping south of the NBR at Dumbuck to a new Dumbarton East station, finally joining the North British line at Dumbarton Junction.

The Lanarkshire and Dumbartonshire line was originally proposed (in 1891) to run through Dumbarton to Aber Bay, near Ross Priory on the east shore of Loch Lomond. This would have run through the Vale of Leven, on the east side of the River Leven, while the NBR line ran on the west side. The duplication aroused considerable opposition from shareholders, and the compromise was reached that the section of the existing line from Dumbarton to Balloch would be made joint. This arrangement was confirmed by Act of Parliament of 27 July 1892, and included transfer to joint control of steamers on Loch Lomond. From Dumbarton Junction the NBR line to Balloch was to be transferred to joint control, between the NBR, the L&DR and the Caledonian Railway, on the day that the L&DR opened its line for passengers to that point. The joint section would be called the Dumbarton and Balloch Joint Railway.

=== Construction and opening ===
The Caledonian Railway subscribed £82,000 to the building of the line, but the majority of the capital was readily subscribed by industrialists in the area to be served; efficient and convenient transport was essential to the heavy industries. The Caledonian agreed to work the line for 4% of the capital.

Work on construction started on 6 October 1891.

On 26 November 1894 the line opened for goods between Maryhill and Balornock Junction. The stub of the Hamiltonhill branch remained connected for the time being, and after 1901 it came into good use delivering supplies to the Ruchill Hospital. (Some of the residual unused land was sold in May 1919.)

The next section opened from Maryhill Central via Kelvinside and Crow Road to the triangular junction at Partick, and between Stobcross and Clydebank on 1 May 1896.

The line was extended to Dumbarton on 15 June 1896. Also opened from Maryhill Central via Kelvinside and Crow Road to a triangular junction at Partick on 1 May 1896.

These openings were for goods trains only: Maryhill had passenger services from 10 August 1896, Possil from 1 Feb 1897 for workmen only, and was fully open from 1 October 1897; on the same day passenger services reached Dawsholm (Glasgow Central Railway).

The line to Dumbarton was fully open from 1 October 1896, from which date the Dumbarton and Balloch Joint Railway was created.

The L&DR generated considerable business from the many heavy industrial sites along the Clyde; the company provided sidings connections from its main line free of charge. However the very large Singer factory provided no goods traffic during the L&DR period: the North British Railway already served it, and concluded a long term exclusive traffic agreement with it before completion of the L&DR line.

=== Taken over by the Caledonian Railway ===
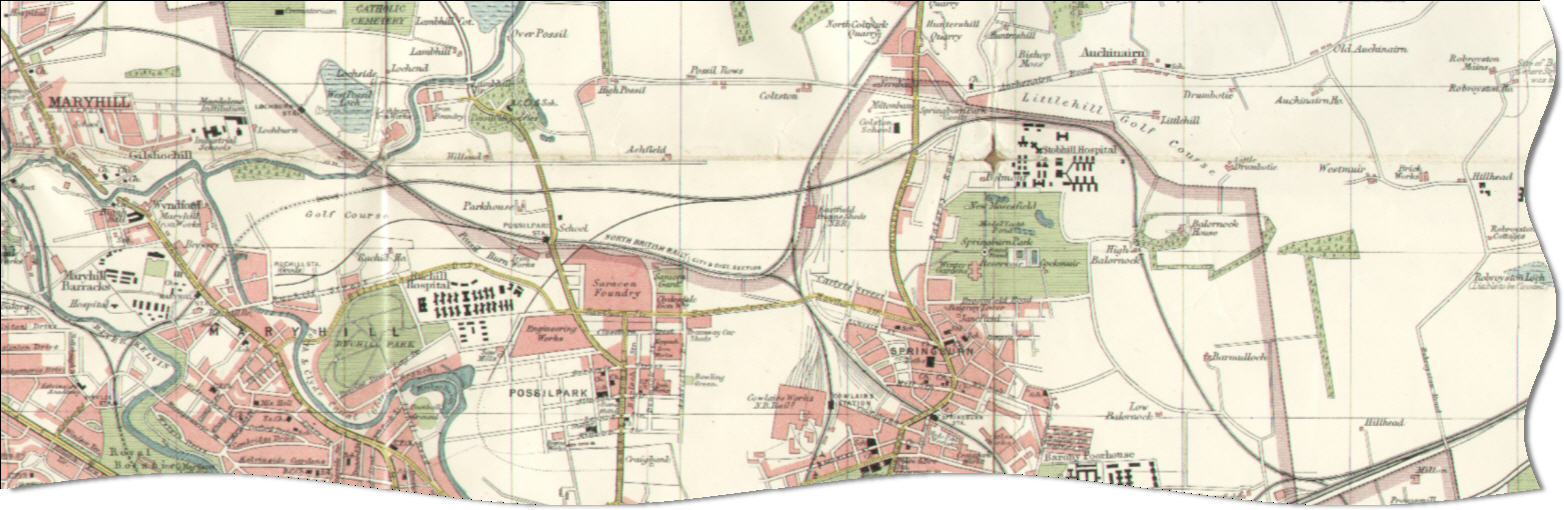
Map showing the line from Maryhill to Springburn Park (Robroyston) in 1923

The L&DR line was worked by the Caledonian and its income was guaranteed by that company; moreover the Caledonian had increased its shareholding substantially, and on 1 August 1909 the L&DR was vested in the Caledonian Railway.

As shipping activity increased, a new Rothesay Dock opened at Clydebank on 25 April 1907. This abstracted much export traffic from traditional ports and docks. The Caledonian Railway built a connecting line from the LD&R line in anticipation of this. Because the line was on viaduct at the locality, the branch diverged from the main line further east, at Scotstoun, and ran north of Dumbarton Road, crossing back under the road and the L&DR main line west of the Yoker - Renfrew Ferry and Kelso Street.

The intensive concentration of industry along the north bank of the Clyde brought enormous traffic volumes of goods and passengers to the line: workers travelled considerable distances, on trains making use of the Glasgow Central Railway. Tramway competition was severe for ordinary passenger travel, but the concentrated volumes of travel to and from work could only be handled by railways, and the Caledonian and the North British between them controlled that.

In 1947 the Forth and Clyde Canal and the Bowling basin were still important:

The quays extend to 740 feet with six lines of rails, and there is a wharf of a length of 460 feet fronting the River Clyde. A considerable quantity of exported coal and imported ores, minerals, iron and steel and general traffic is handled at Bowling ...

The Railways Act 1921 brought about the "grouping" of the main line railways of Great Britain, and from 1923 the Caledonian Railway was a constituent of the new London Midland and Scottish Railway; the rival NBR was a constituent of the new London and North Eastern Railway, so the competition continued, and the Dumbarton and Balloch Joint Railway was now joint between those two companies.

=== From 1948 ===
The railways were nationalised in 1948, and the lines in Scotland formed part of the new Scottish Region of British Railways. Although the competitive pressure was abated, the former L&DR route and the NBR route served different residential and industrial areas, and for some time both routes continued largely unchanged. However industrial patterns were changing substantially, especially from the rise of low-cost heavy industry and mineral extraction in Asia and South America, and the exhaustion of many of the Lanarkshire coal and iron pits. This led to the decline of the industries served by the railway. At the same time motor bus services improved in efficiency substantially, and it was clear that the parallel railways needed to be modernised and simplified.

It was decided to electrify the line between Glasgow and Balloch and Helensburgh, but to retain only one of the duplicate routes: the former NBR route. However immediately east of Dumbarton the former L&DR line served industrial complexes as well as Dumbarton East station in a large residential area, so that part of the route was retained. The two lines came close to one another at Dunglass, a little west of Bowling, and a connection was installed there, so that trains from Glasgow on the NBR route could switch to the L&DR line.

The new arrangement started with a skeleton service on 5 November 1960, when electric trains between Glasgow and Balloch and Helensburgh were in operation. A full service ran from the following day. Steam trains on the L&DR route from Glasgow to Balloch continued for the time being.

On 30 October 1960, during trial running, a transformer explosion occurred in an electric train at Charing Cross, Glasgow; and on 13 December a serious explosion occurred in the guard's compartment of an electric train at Renton, and this was followed by other serious problems and the electric service was suspended. Steam trains resumed (although some steam engines had been taken out of service permanently). The normal electric service was resumed after modifications to the electrical equipment in the trains on 1 October 1961, but ordinary running of steam-hauled trains on the L&DR route to Glasgow continued until that line closed in 1964.

Goods services were maintained over certain sections of the route to serve industrial premises. From Old Kilpatrick to Glasgow continued until 1993; in 1976 a connection to the NBR line was laid in between Kilbowie and Clydebank, and the L&DR section eastwards was closed. The dock at Clydebank continued to be served from Stobcross until 1980; from Stobcross to Possil continued in use until 1966; and the section from Possil to Balornock closed in 1965.

With the exception of the section between Dunglass and Dumbarton Junction—which was taken over for the new electric service—the entire former L&DR network is now closed.

== Station list ==
From west to east locations on the Lanarkshire and Dumbartonshire Railway were:

=== Main line ===
- Dumbarton Junction; end on junction with the Dumbarton and Balloch Joint Railway;
- Dumbarton East; opened 1 October 1896; still open; the Railway Clearing House Diagram shows the word "Knoxland", referring to the nearby housing scheme, against the station name.
- Dunglass; location of the 1960 connection to the North British line;
- Bowling; opened 1 October 1896; closed 1 January 1917; reopened August 1917; closed 5 February 1951;
- Old Kilpatrick; opened 1 October 1896; closed 5 October 1964;
- Dalmuir; opened 1 October 1896; renamed Dalmuir Riverside 1952; closed 5 October 1964;
- Kilbowie Road; opened 1 October 1896; renamed Kilbowie 1908; closed 5 October 1964;
- Clydebank; opened 1 October 1896; renamed Clydebank Riverside 1953; closed 5 October 1964;
- Yoker; opened 1 October 1896; renamed Yoker Ferry 1953; closed 5 October 1964;
- Scotstoun; opened 1 October 1896; renamed Scotstoun West 1900; closed 5 October 1964;
- Victoria Park; renamed Scotstoun 1900; renamed Scotstoun East 1952; closed 5 October 1964;
- Whiteinch; opened 1 October 1896; renamed Whiteinch Riverside 1953; closed 5 October 1964;
- Partick West Junction; divergence to Kelvinside line;
- Partick West; opened 1 October 1896; closed 5 October 1964;
- Partick East Junction; convergence of Kelvinside line;
- Merkland Street Tunnel;
- Partick Central; opened 1 May 1896; renamed Kelvin Hall 15 June 1959; closed 5 October 1964;
- * Yorkhill Tunnel;
- Stobcross; Glasgow Central Railway station; opened 10 August 1896; closed 3 August 1959.

=== Balornock line ===
- Partick West and East junctions; see above
- Partick North Junction;
- Crow Road Tunnel;
- Crow Road; opened 1 October 1896; closed 6 November 1960;
- Kelvinside Tunnel;
- Kelvinside; opened 1 April 1897; closed 1 January 1917; reopened 2 June 1919; closed 1 July 1942;
- Balgray Tunnel;
- Bellshaugh Junction; convergence of Dawsholm branch; divergence of Glasgow Central Railway to Kirklee;
- Kelvinside North Junction; convergence of Glasgow Central Railway line;
- Maryhill; opened 10 August 1896; renamed Maryhill Central 1952; closed 5 October 1964;
- Tamshill Tunnel;
- Possil; opened 1 February 1897 (workmen's service only); fully open from 1 October 1897; closed 1 May 1908; reopened 8 January 1934; closed 5 October 1964;
- Possil Junction; convergence of Hamiltonhill branch and commencement of earlier Caledonian Railway route;
- Balornock Junction; connection with Buchanan Street route.
