= Bellgrove railway station =

Railway station in Glasgow

Bellgrove
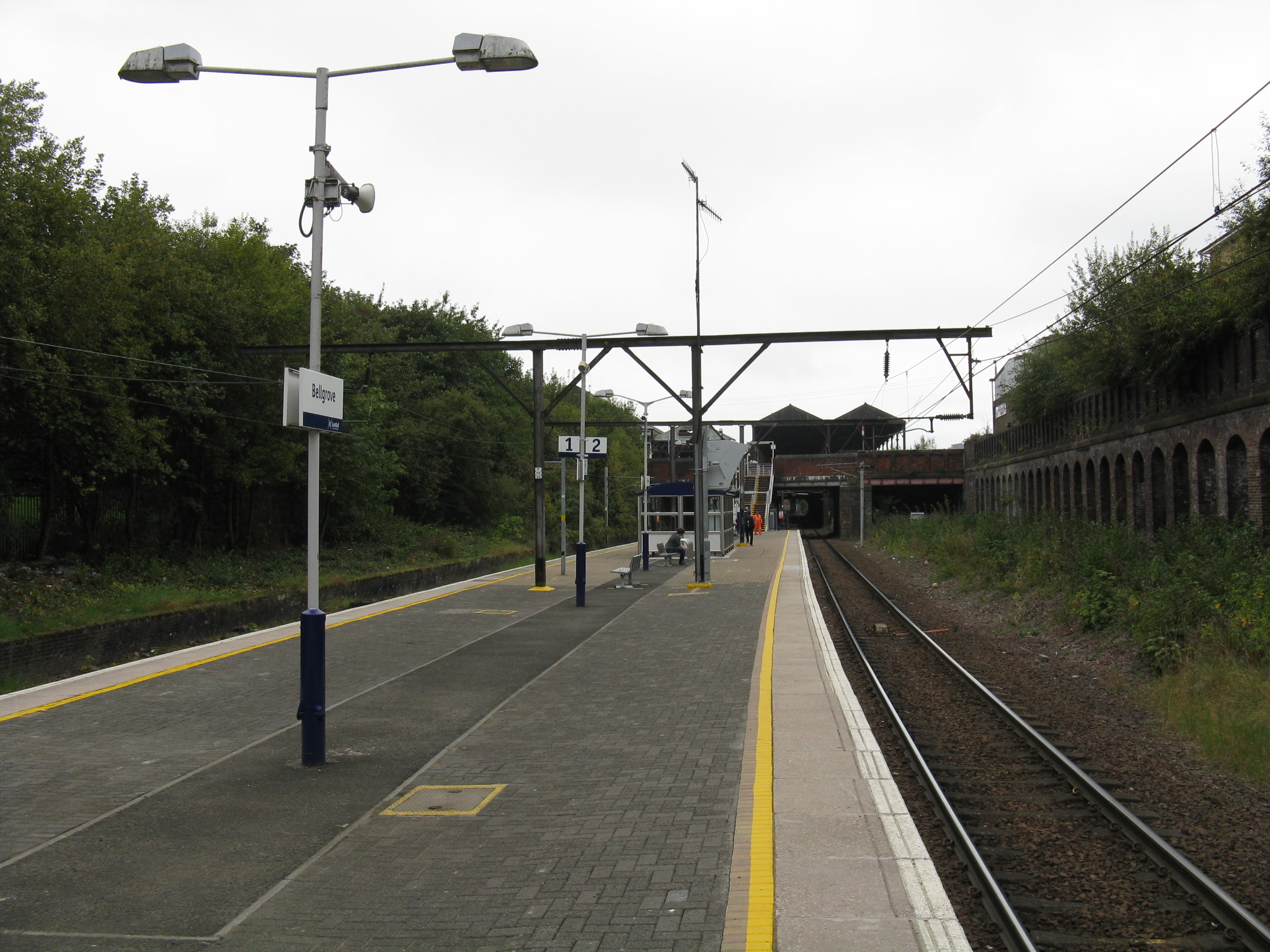
- View west towards High Street

General information
- Location: Dennistoun, Glasgow; Scotland
- Coordinates: 55.8567°N 4.2240°W
- Grid reference: NS608648
- Managed by: ScotRail
- Transit authority: SPT
- Platforms: 2

Other information
- Station code: BLG
- Fare zone: 1

History
- Original company: Bathgate and Coatbridge Railway
- Pre-grouping: North British Railway
- Post-grouping: London and North Eastern Railway

Key dates
- 1 June 1871: Opened

Passengers
- 2020/21: ▼0.148 million
- Interchange: ▼1,362
- 2021/22: ▲0.422 million
- Interchange: ▲9,646
- 2022/23: ▲0.554 million
- Interchange: ▲15,751
- 2023/24: ▲0.719 million
- Interchange: ▲19,351
- 2024/25: ▲0.744 million
- Interchange: ▲25,024
Location
Notes
- Passenger statistics from the Office of Rail and Road

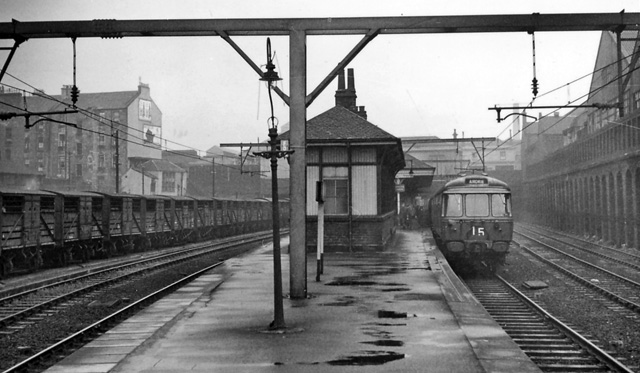
Bellgrove station in 1961

Bellgrove Railway Station is in the East End of Glasgow, Scotland, serving the city's Calton, Gallowgate and south Dennistoun neighbourhoods. The station is approximately 1 mile (1.6 km) to the east of Glasgow Queen Street, and is managed by ScotRail.

The station is an island platform served by trains on the North Clyde Line, and provides an interchange between the lines to Springburn and Edinburgh Waverley.

The station is accessed from Bellgrove Street via stairs, and is approximately a mile (2 km) away from Celtic Park.

== History ==
The station opened in 1871 on the North British Railways Coatbridge branch and the City of Glasgow Union Railway cross-city line from Shields Junction. The City of Glasgow Union Railway (CGUR) added a branch northwestwards to Springburn in 1875, to give access to the Edinburgh and Glasgow Railway main line at Cowlairs by means of running powers over the E&G Sighthill Branch, whilst the impressive terminus at Glasgow St Enoch opened a year later. Services on the Coatbridge route did not run there however, the NBR instead using a separate terminus known as College situated on the end of a short spur from the CGUR route southwest of Bellgrove. This only lasted until 1886, when the Glasgow City and District Railway was opened from Partickhill via a low level station at Queen Street to join the CGUR at High Street East Junction. This was henceforth used by all services from the Coatbridge & Airdrie direction and also by the newly inaugurated passenger services to Springburn (trains had been progressively introduced on the route prior to this, but only as far as Barnhill).

The North British company took over the CGUR in 1896 jointly with the Glasgow and South Western Railway, operating all services on the Springburn line thereafter. Local traffic on the remainder of the line from St Enoch declined in the face of strong competition from the local tram network and by 1902, the one intermediate station at Gallowgate had been closed. Services continued to run from St Enoch to Bridgeton Central until 1913, but thereafter the line was only used by freight & parcels traffic, periodic excursions & other special trains.

Services beyond Airdrie were withdrawn by British Railways in January 1956, whilst St Enoch closed to passengers a decade later in June 1966 and was subsequently demolished. One more positive development was the North Clyde Line electrification scheme of 1960, which brought overhead wiring to the Queen St LL - Airdrie & Springburn routes in November that year.

The former CGUR route is still used by freight and empty stock transfer moves between Queen Street High Level or Eastfield depot and the city's other main DMU depot at Corkerhill on the south side of Glasgow, whilst the Bathgate link was restored by Network Rail in 2010, after an absence of 28 years.

== Bellgrove rail crash ==
On 6 March 1989, the station was the scene of a head-on collision between two Class 303 trains on the Springburn branch in which two people died.

== Services ==
=== From 2010 ===
On Monday to Saturday during the day-time, eight trains per hour (some commencing from Bellgrove) go westbound to Glasgow Queen Street and beyond Helensburgh Central, Dalmuir, Milngavie etc.) on the North Clyde Line.

Eastbound, there is a service every fifteen minutes towards Airdrie, half-hourly towards Springburn and hourly to Edinburgh Waverley.

In the evening, four trains per hour go towards Glasgow Queen Street and there is a half-hourly service to both Springburn and Edinburgh.

On Sundays, there is a half-hourly service westbound to Glasgow Queen Street and Helensburgh Central and eastbound to Edinburgh.

=== 2013–14 ===
Westbound there are six trains per hour to Glasgow Queen St and points west (two each to Helensburgh Central, Balloch via Singer, and Dalmuir via Yoker). Milngavie services usually only call at peak periods. Westbound there are four trains to Airdrie and two to Springburn each hour, with two of the Airdrie trains continuing to Edinburgh.

In the evenings there are two trains per hour each to Springburn and Edinburgh eastbound and to Balloch via Singer and Helensburgh via Yoker westbound.

The Sunday service remains unchanged from 2010.

=== 2016 ===
The basic 6 tph frequency remains unchanged in both directions, but the destinations served have been altered as part of the December 2014 timetable recast. Westbound trains now run to Milngavie, Balloch via Singer and Dumbarton Central via Yoker (2tph to each), whilst eastbound there are services to Springburn and Cumbernauld, Airdrie (4tph) and Edinburgh (2tph). On Sundays there are 2tph on the Edinburgh to Helensburgh Central route each way calling and 1 tph between Partick and Cumbernauld.

=== 2018 ===
Changes to the timetable in December 2018 have seen Springburn become the northern terminus for branch services once more (passengers to destinations beyond have to change there once more), though the service frequency remains otherwise unaltered.

=== Routes ===
Preceding station	National Rail	Following station
Duke Street	ScotRail; North Clyde Line	High Street
Carntyne	ScotRail; North Clyde Line	High Street
	Historical railways	
Carntyne; Line and Station open	Coatbridge Branch; North British Railway	College; Line and Station closed
Terminus	Glasgow City and District Railway; North British Railway	High Street; Line and Station open
Duke Street; Line and Station open	City of Glasgow Union Railway; G&SWR and NBR	Gallowgate Central; Line open; Station closed
