= Alexandra Parade railway station =

Railway station in Glasgow, Scotland

Alexandra Parade Scottish Gaelic: Pairèad Alexandra
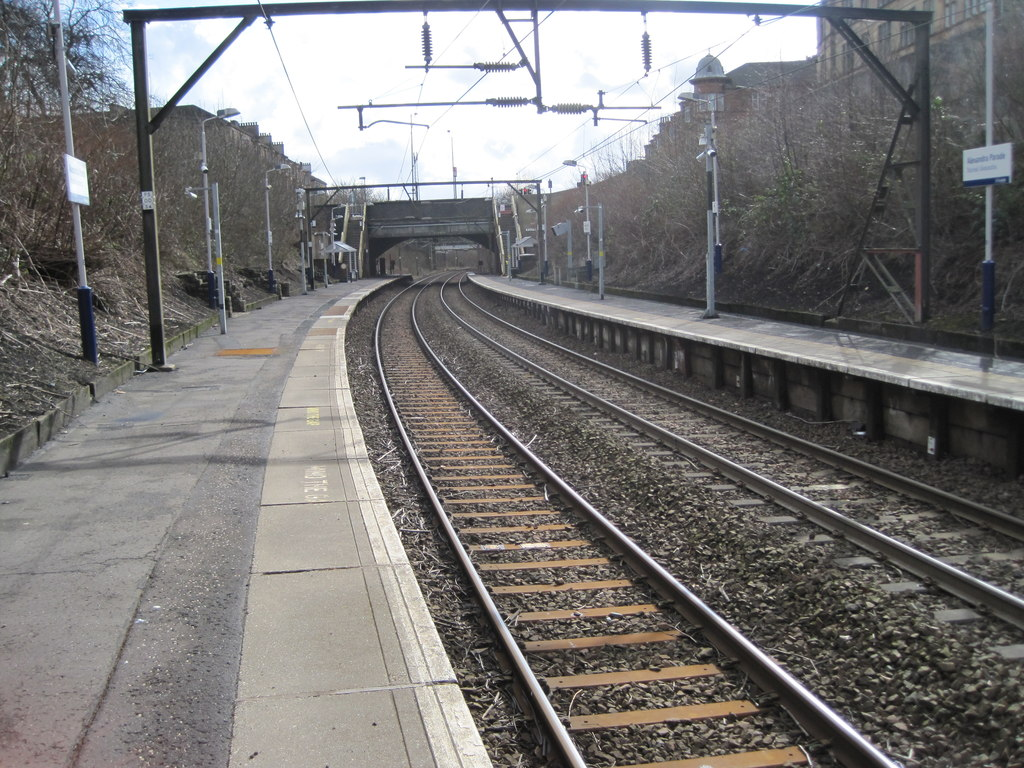

General information
- Location: Glasgow Cross, Glasgow; Scotland
- Coordinates: 55.8637°N 4.2107°W
- Grid reference: NS617655
- Manager: ScotRail
- Transit authority: SPT
- Platforms: 2

Other information
- Station code: AXP
- Fare zone: 1

Key dates
- 1 July 1881: Opened as Alexandra Park
- 1 January 1917: Station closed
- 2 June 1919: Station reopened
- 9 July 1923: Station renamed Alexandra Parade

Passengers
- 2021/22: ▲0.200 million
- 2022/23: ▲0.264 million
- 2023/24: ▲0.362 million
- 2024/25: ▼0.344 million
- 2025/26: ▲0.381 million
Location
Notes
- Passenger statistics from the Office of Rail and Road

Alexandra Parade railway station is a railway station in Glasgow, Scotland. The station is 1 3/4 miles (2.8 km) east of Glasgow Queen Street on the Springburn branch of the North Clyde Line. The station is managed by ScotRail.

It was built as part of the City of Glasgow Union Railway which provided a link across the Clyde (between the Glasgow and Paisley Joint Railway at Shields Junction and the Edinburgh and Glasgow Railway at Sighthill Junction).

The station's westbound platform was closed for routine maintenance works on January 18, 2025, during which the platform was demolished and rebuilt. It reopened on May 17, 2025.

== Services ==
- 2tph to Milngavie via Glasgow Queen St Low Level, Partick, and Westerton
- 2tph to Springburn

On Sundays, an hourly Partick to Springburn service each way operates between 10am and 6pm.

Preceding station	National Rail	Following station
Barnhill	ScotRail; North Clyde Line	Duke Street
	Historical railways	
Garngad; Line open; Station closed	City of Glasgow Union Railway; G&SWR and NBR	Duke Street; Line and Station open
