= Duke Street railway station =

Railway station in Glasgow, Scotland

Duke Street Scottish Gaelic: Sràid an Diùic
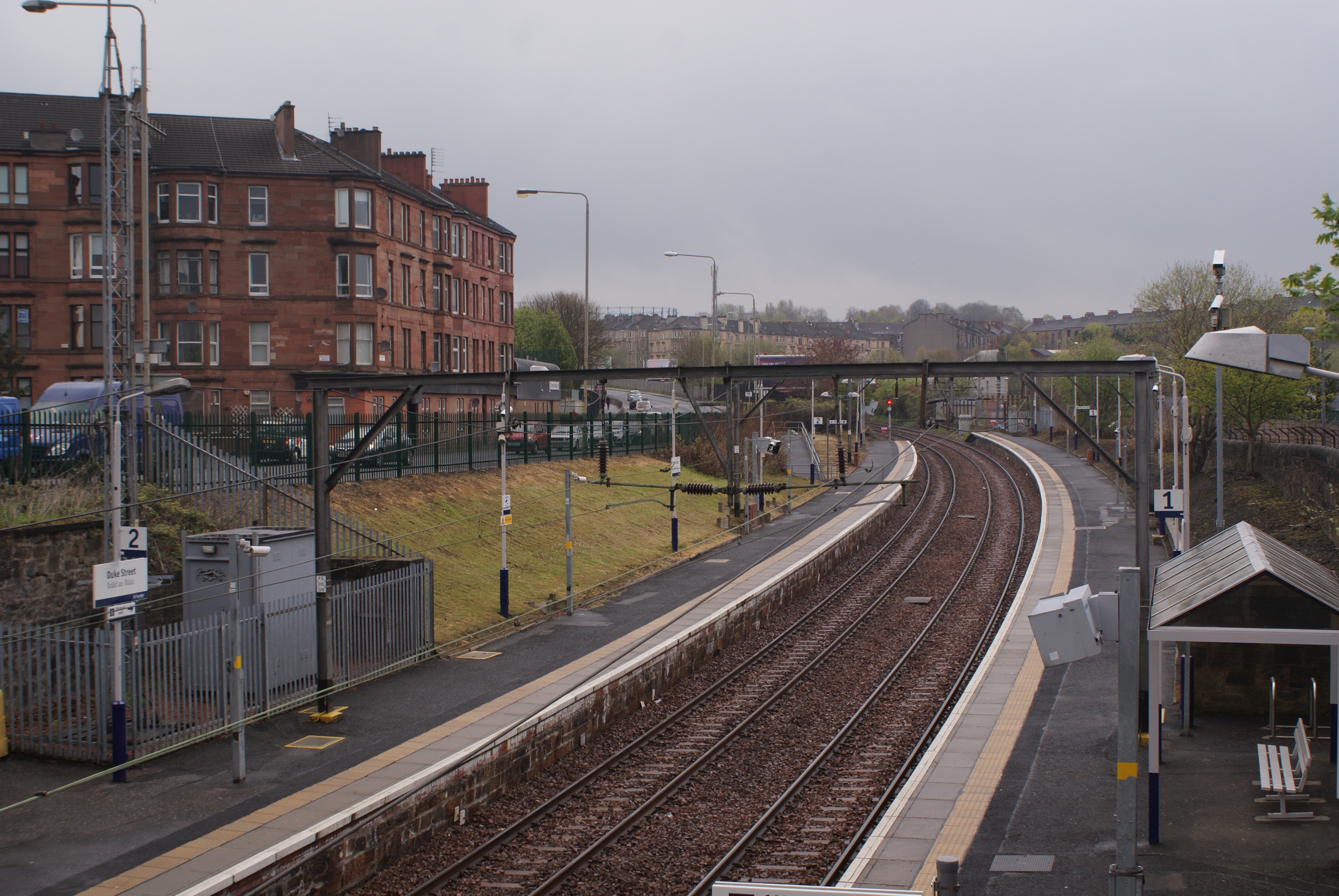

General information
- Location: Dennistoun, Glasgow; Scotland
- Coordinates: 55.8590°N 4.2122°W
- Grid reference: NS616650
- Manager: ScotRail
- Transit authority: SPT
- Platforms: 2

Other information
- Station code: DST
- Fare zone: 1

History
- Original company: City of Glasgow Union Railway

Key dates
- 1 January 1881: Opened

Passengers
- 2021/22: ▲0.108 million
- 2022/23: ▲0.146 million
- 2023/24: ▲0.185 million
- 2024/25: ▲0.225 million
- 2025/26: ▲0.264 million
Location
Notes
- Passenger statistics from the Office of Rail and Road

Duke Street Railway Station is a railway station in Glasgow, Scotland. The station is managed by ScotRail and is served by trains on the North Clyde Line, 1½ miles (2 km) north east of Glasgow Queen Street.

It was built as part of the City of Glasgow Union Railway which provided a link across the Clyde (between the Glasgow and Paisley Joint Railway at Shields Junction and the Edinburgh and Glasgow Railway at Sighthill Junction). Though goods traffic began using the line in 1875, the station was not opened until 1881 with trains initially running as far as Alexandra Park (as it was then known). An extension to Barnhill followed two years later, but it was not until 1887 that they finally reached Springburn.

Electric operation at the station began in 1960 (using the 25 kV A.C overhead system), when the branch from Bellgrove was incorporated into the North Clyde line electrification scheme. Through running to Cumbernauld began in May 2014 - prior to this a change at Springburn was required.

== Services ==
Monday to Saturday there is a half-hourly service northbound to Springburn and southbound to Glasgow Queen Street and beyond (usually to Dumbarton Central).

The proposed timetable changes in 2022 would create a half hourly service in each direction at Duke Street, going eastbound to Springburn and westbound to Milngavie

On Sundays, an hourly service between Partick and Springburn call in each direction between 10am and 6pm

| Preceding station | National Rail | Following station |
|---|---|---|
| Alexandra Parade | ScotRail; North Clyde Line | Bellgrove |
| | Historical railways | |
| Alexandra Parade | City of Glasgow Union Railway; G&SWR and NBR | Bellgrove |
