= High Street (Glasgow) railway station =

Railway station in Glasgow, Scotland

High Street (Glasgow) Scottish Gaelic: Àrd-Shràid
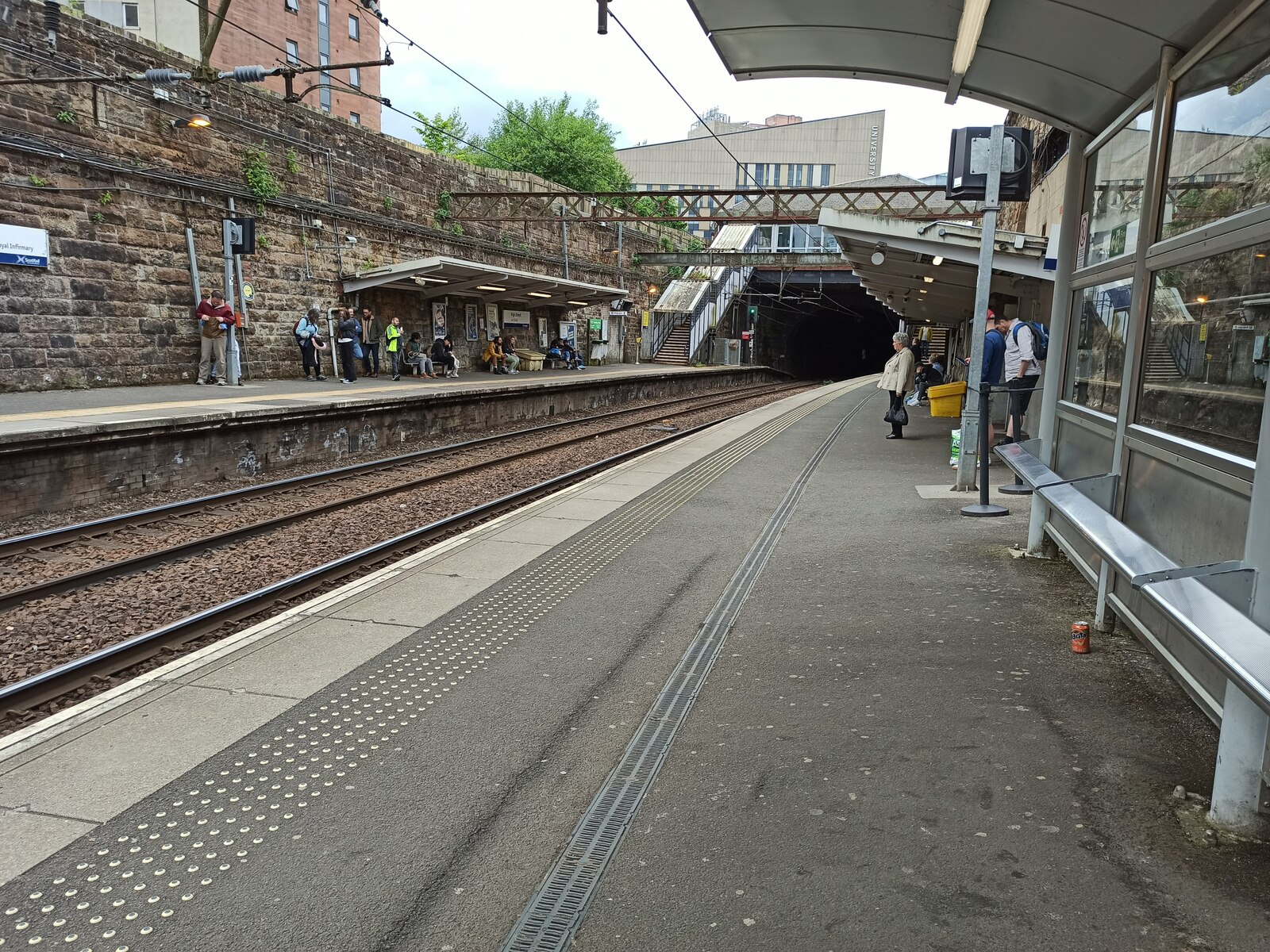
- View west towards Glasgow Queen Street Low Level

General information
- Location: Glasgow, Glasgow; Scotland
- Coordinates: 55.8594°N 4.2400°W
- Grid reference: NS598651
- Owner: Network Rail
- Manager: ScotRail
- Transit authority: SPT
- Platforms: 2

Other information
- Station code: HST
- Fare zone: 1

History
- Original company: Glasgow City and District Railway
- Pre-grouping: North British Railway
- Post-grouping: London and North Eastern Railway

Key dates
- 15 March 1866: Opened as College replacing the station on the CoGUR
- 1 January 1914: Renamed as High Street

Passengers
- 2020/21: ▼0.109 million
- 2021/22: ▲0.369 million
- 2022/23: ▲0.554 million
- 2023/24: ▲0.827 million
- 2024/25: ▲0.841 million
Location
Notes
- Passenger statistics from the Office of Rail and Road

High Street railway station serves High Street in Glasgow, Scotland and the surrounding area, which includes Townhead, the Merchant City, as well the western fringes of Dennistoun and Calton. The station is managed by ScotRail and is served by trains on the North Clyde Line. It is located in the eastern part of the city centre, with Strathclyde University, Glasgow Cathedral and Glasgow Royal Infirmary being major institutions located nearby.

== History ==
The first railway station in the area was College on the City of Glasgow Union Railway which closed with the opening of this station in 1866. The station took its current name at the beginning of 1914.

== Plans ==
As part of the proposed Crossrail Glasgow initiative, High Street station may be demolished and relocated.

== Services ==
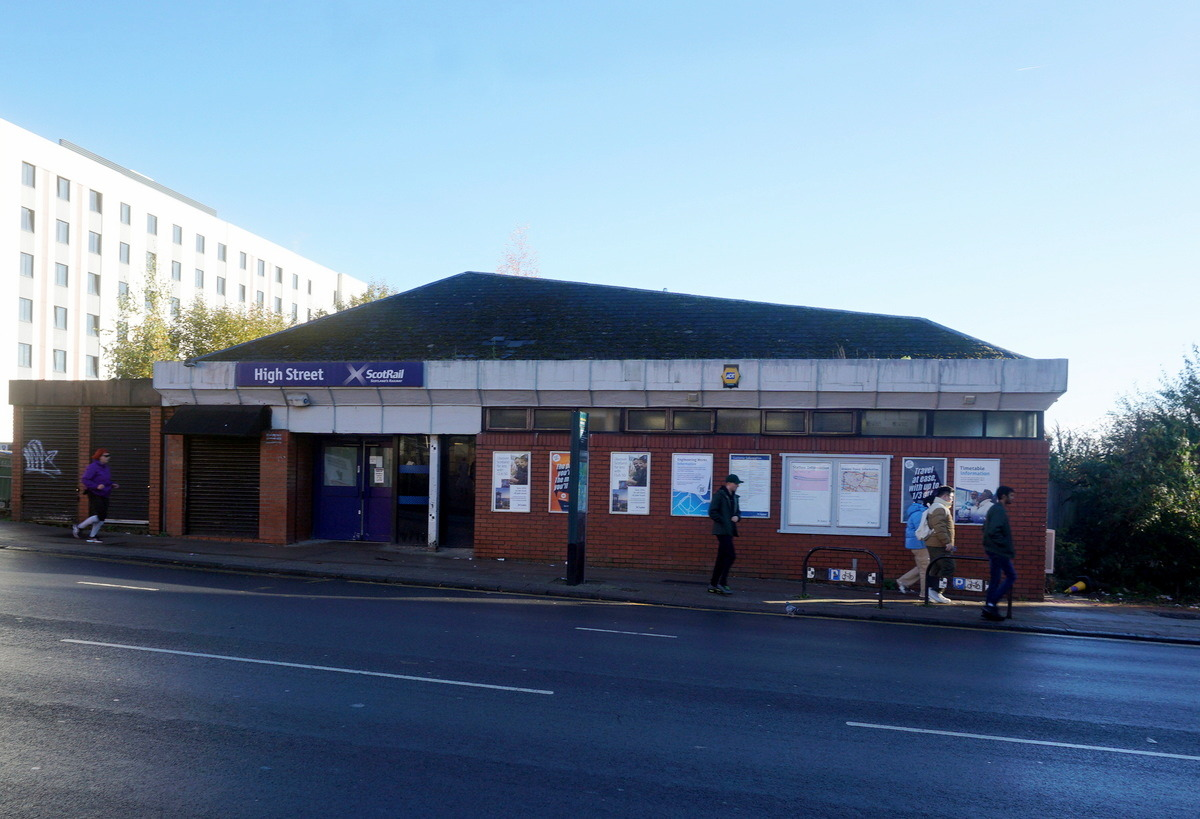
The station building

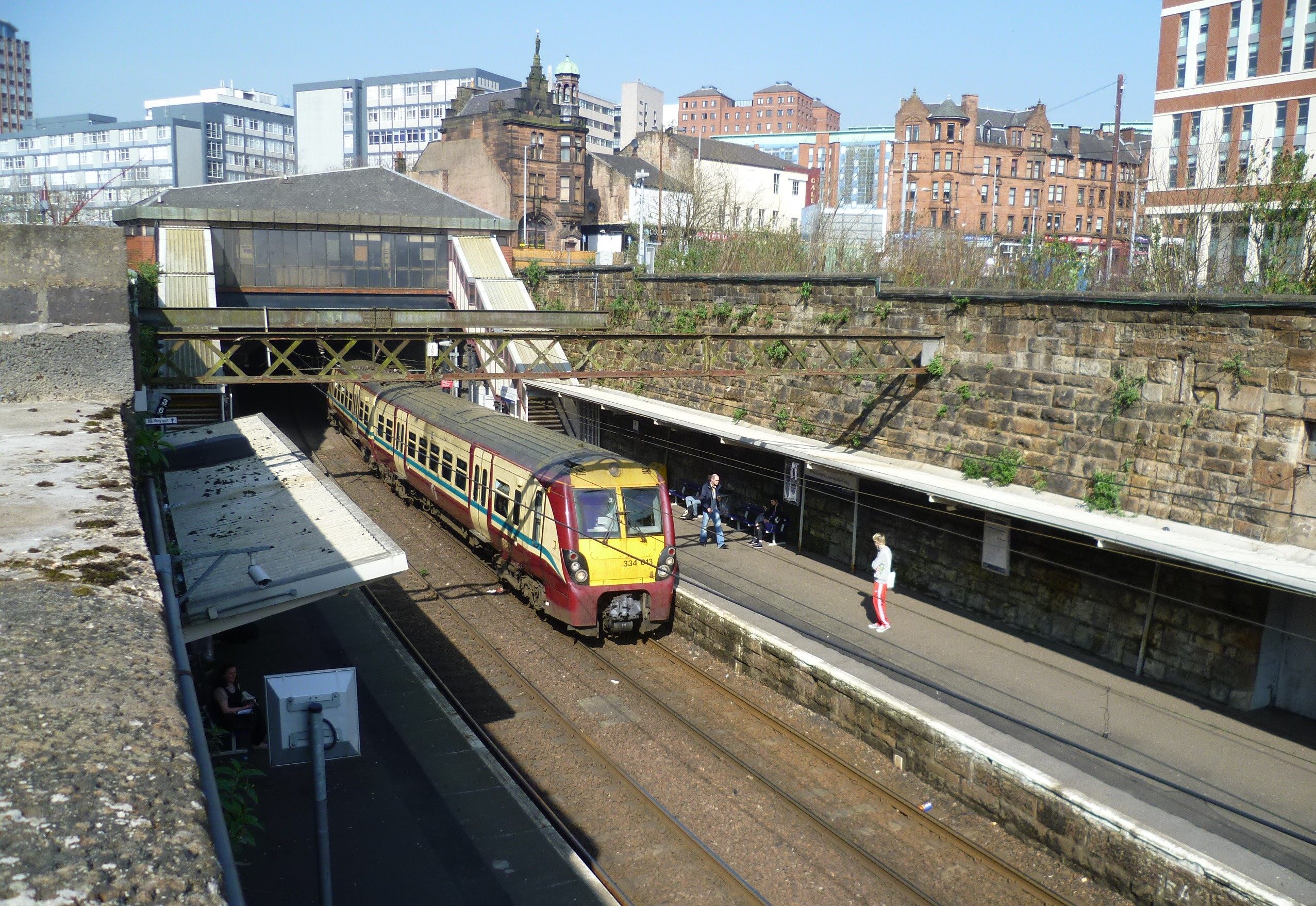
The station in 2012. The campus buildings of Strathclyde University are visible at the top of the photograph.

=== 2008 ===
There is a regular service Monday to Saturday to Glasgow Queen Street and beyond (Helensburgh Central etc.) on the North Clyde Line westbound and to Airdrie and Springburn eastbound.

Sundays there is a half-hourly service westbound to Glasgow Queen Street and Helensburgh Central and eastbound to Airdrie.

=== 2013 ===
The station has half-hourly services westbound to each of Helensburgh Central (limited stop), Balloch via Singer (stopping), Milngavie and Dalmuir via Yoker (stopping) (8tph in all via Queen Street, Partick and Hyndland). Eastbound there are 6tph to Airdrie, of which 4tph continue all the way to Edinburgh Waverley via Bathgate (two of these are limited stop, the others call at all intermediate stations). There is also a half-hourly service to Springburn although this has now been extended to Cumbernauld station and also now runs on a Sunday.

On Sundays there is a half-hourly service to Helensburgh via Singer westbound and Edinburgh eastbound.

Preceding station	National Rail	Following station
Bellgrove	ScotRail; Edinburgh Waverley - Helensburgh Central or Balloch	Glasgow Queen Street
Garrowhill	ScotRail; Edinburgh Waverley - Helensburgh Central or Balloch	Glasgow Queen Street
	Historical railways	
Gallowgate Central; Line and Station closed	Glasgow City and District Railway; North British Railway	Glasgow Queen Street; Line and Station open
Bellgrove; Line and Station open	Coatbridge Branch; North British Railway	Junction between Coatbridge Branch and Glasgow City and District Railway
