= College railway station (Scotland) =

Disused railway station in Glasgow, Scotland

College

General information
- Location: Glasgow, Lanarkshire; Scotland
- Coordinates: 55.859380°N 4.240125°W

Other information
- Status: Disused

History
- Original company: North British Railway
- Pre-grouping: North British Railway

Key dates
- 1 February 1871: Opened
- 15 March 1886: Closed
Location

College railway station served the city of Glasgow, historically in Lanarkshire, Scotland, from 1871 to 1886 on the Coatbridge Branch.

== History ==
The station was opened on 1 February 1871 by the North British Railway. It was replaced by Glasgow High Street on 15 March 1886.

Preceding station	Disused railways	Following station
Bellgrove; Line and station closed	North British Railway; Coatbridge Branch	Terminus
