= Glasgow Bellgrove rail accident =

Railway crash at Bellgrove, Glasgow, Scotland, in 1989

Coordinates: 55°51′23″N 4°13′12″W

Glasgow Bellgrove rail crash

Details
- Date: 6 March 1989
- Location: near Bellgrove, Glasgow
- Country: Scotland
- Line: North Clyde Line (Strathclyde Passenger Transport)
- Operator: Provincial ScotRail
- Cause: Signal Passed At Danger

Statistics
- Trains: 2
- Deaths: 2
- Injured: 58

The Bellgrove rail accident occurred on 6 March 1989 when two passenger trains collided near Bellgrove station, Glasgow, United Kingdom. Two people were killed and 53 were injured. The cause was driver error, with a signal being passed at danger. The layout of a junction was a contributory factor.

== Background ==
Bellgrove Junction is on the North Clyde Line, where a branch to Springburn leaves the main line. In April 1987, the double junction was replaced by a single lead junction, with a short stretch of single line. The timetable had to be modified as a result of this change, with branch trains to Bellgrove station being timed to arrive 1 minute before trains to Springburn station departed from Bellgrove. Had the junction not been modified, the accident could not have happened.

== Accident ==
On 6 March 1989, two Class 303 commuter trains crashed on the Springburn branch of the North Clyde Line, just east of Bellgrove station in the East End of Glasgow, Scotland. The driver of one of the trains and a passenger died in the crash. Fifty-three people were injured. The trains involved were the 2A01 Milngavie-Springburn service and the 2A02 Springburn to Milngavie service. The service from Springburn was scheduled to depart from Bellgrove for Milngavie at 12:46 and the service from Bellgrove to Springburn was scheduled to depart from Bellgrove at 12:47. The accident occurred two days after an accident at Purley, Surrey.

The accident was of a type known as "ding-ding, and away". It was caused primarily by a signal passed at danger (SPAD) in conjunction with the single-lead junction track layout, where two lines converged into one just beyond the platform end and then diverged again – a layout which is simpler to maintain but is vulnerable in the event of a SPAD. This type of junction has been implicated in other accidents, notably to the south-east of Glasgow in the Newton rail accident just a couple of years later. A signalman at Bellgrove became aware that the train had passed the signal at danger and attempted to warn the driver by placing detonators on the track, although the detonators worked, this action was unsuccessful. Both trains were travelling at 15 mph (25 km/h), so the collision speed was 30 mph (50 km/h). The force of the impact was so severe that at least one passenger was thrown out of his seat and completely destroyed one of the "A" frame back-to-back seats. The injured were taken to the Royal Infirmary, Victoria Infirmary and Western Infirmary. All but five of them were released from hospital that day.

== Aftermath ==
As a result of the accidents at Purley and Bellgrove, the scope of the inquiry into the Clapham Junction rail crash, headed by Anthony Hidden, QC, was expanded to also cover safety management on the railway on the instruction of Paul Channon MP, the Transport Secretary.

The two leading carriages in each train were severely damaged and were written off. Both centre carriages were damaged, and both rear carriages were undamaged. Following repairs to track and signalling equipment, rail services were restored the next day.

== Investigations ==
The accident was investigated by Her Majesty's Railway Inspectorate. Public hearings were held at the Merchant's House, Glasgow between 19 and 21 April 1989. An official report, delivered in May 1990, determined that the Milngavie-to-Springburn train had passed the signal at danger, causing a collision with the Springburn-to-Milngavie service. Seven safety recommendations were made. A fatal accident inquiry was held between 10 and 25 July 1989 by A. C. McKay, the Sheriff of Glasgow and Strathkelvin. Sheriff McKay declared that the operation of Bellgrove Junction constituted "a defect in the system of working". Another contributory factor to the accident was that the distance from the signal at Bellgrove to the fouling point of the junction was only 116 yards (106 m), when it should have been at least 200 yards (180 m).
