= James Carswell =

Scottish railway engineer

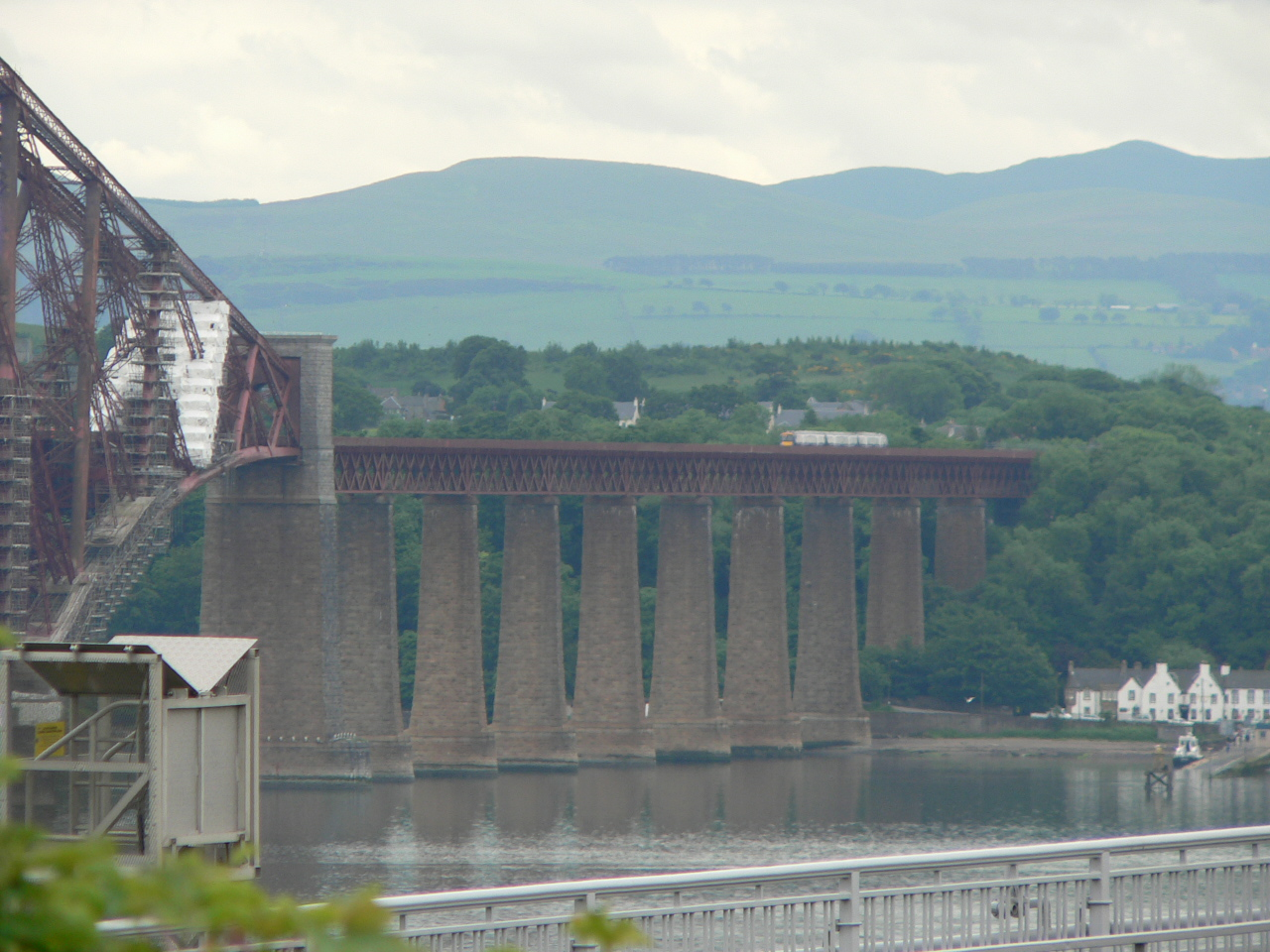
The southern approach to the Forth Bridge

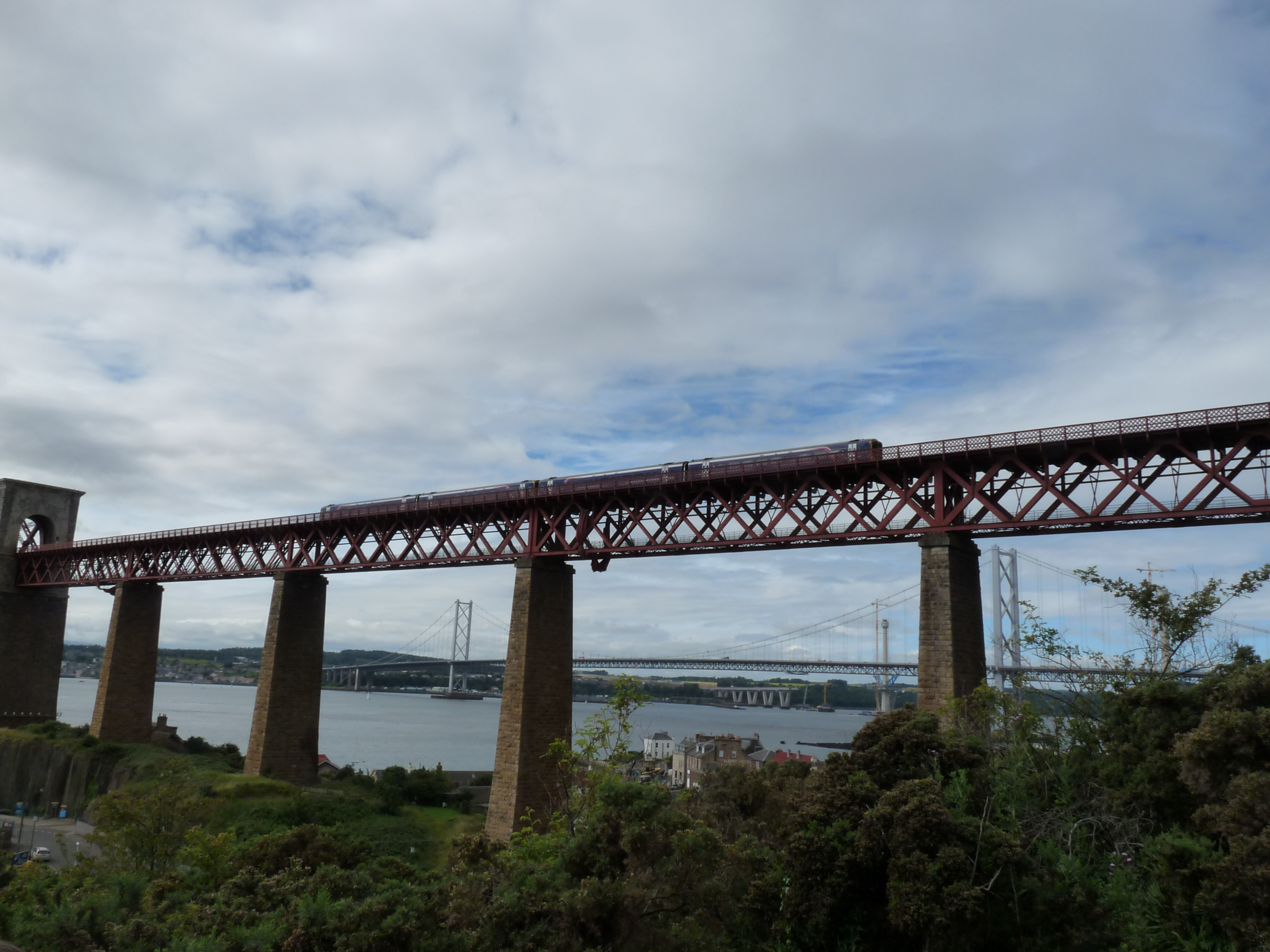
The northern approach to the Forth Bridge

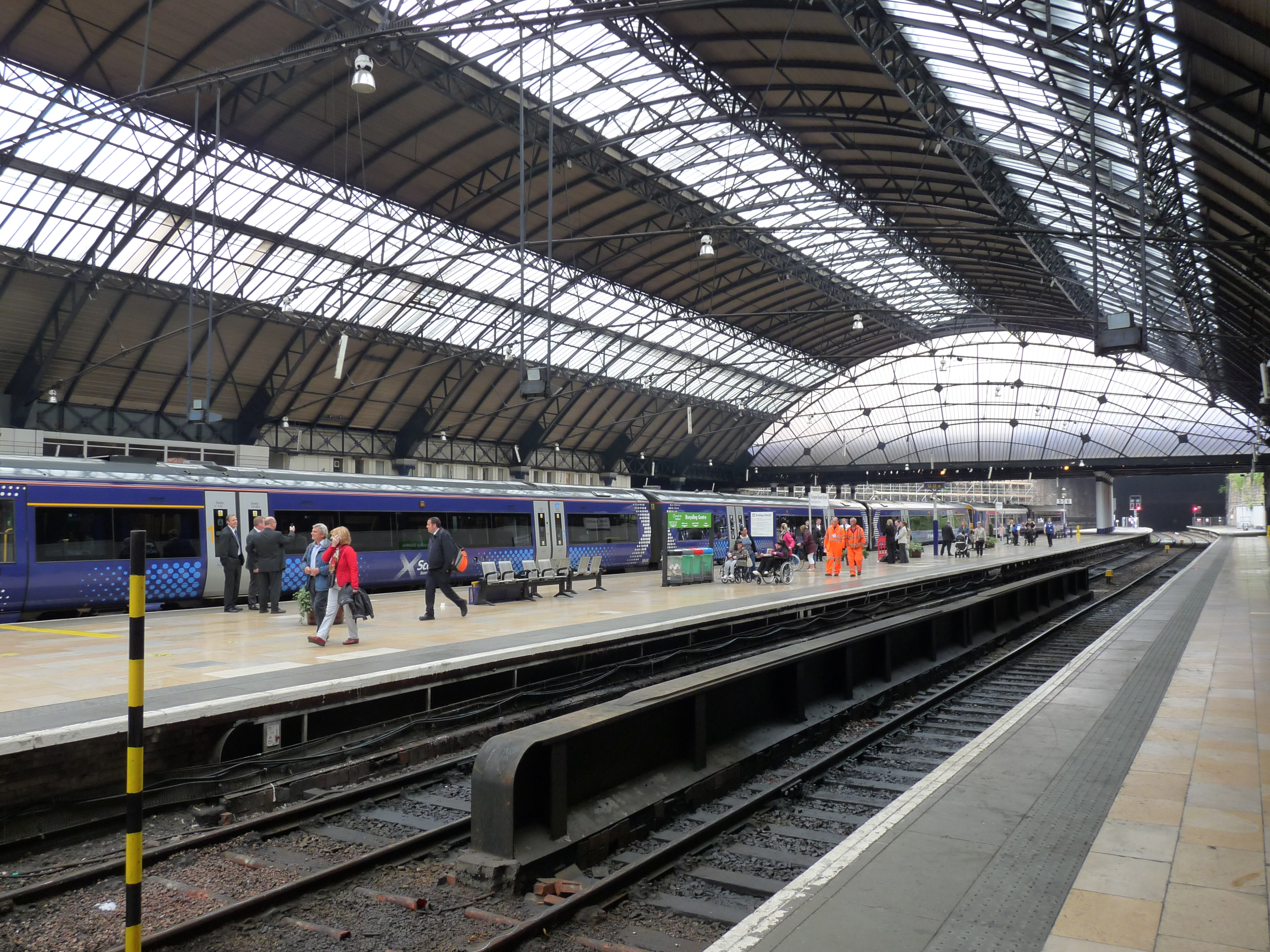
Glasgow Queen Street station 2015 06

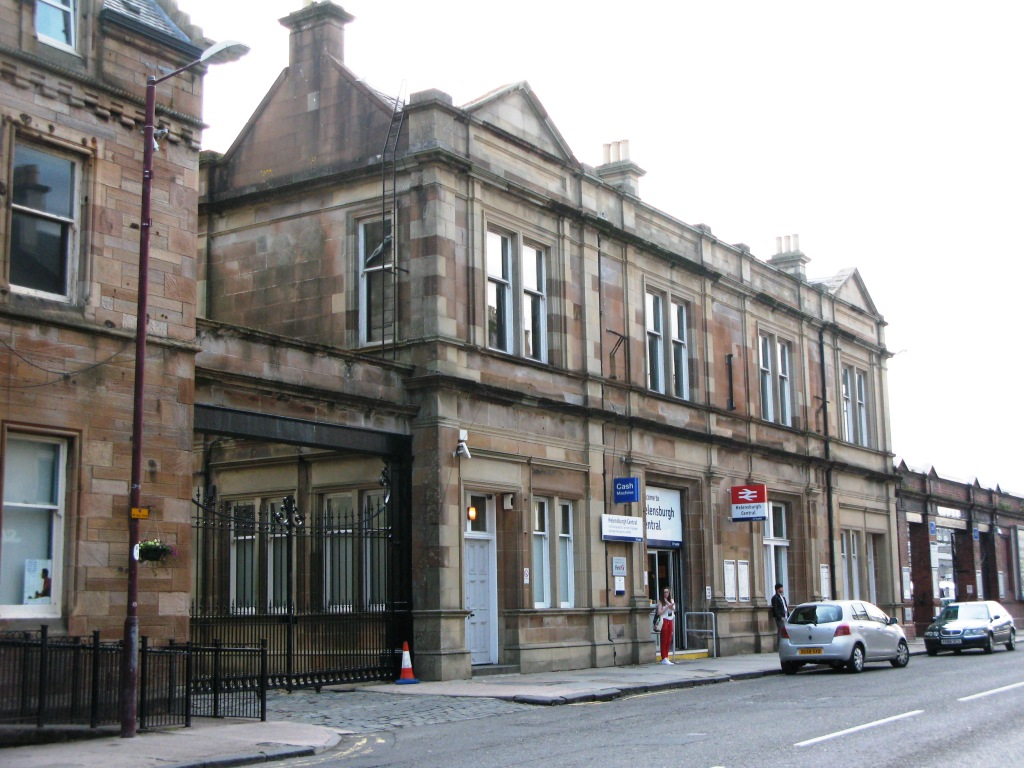
Helensburgh Central Station

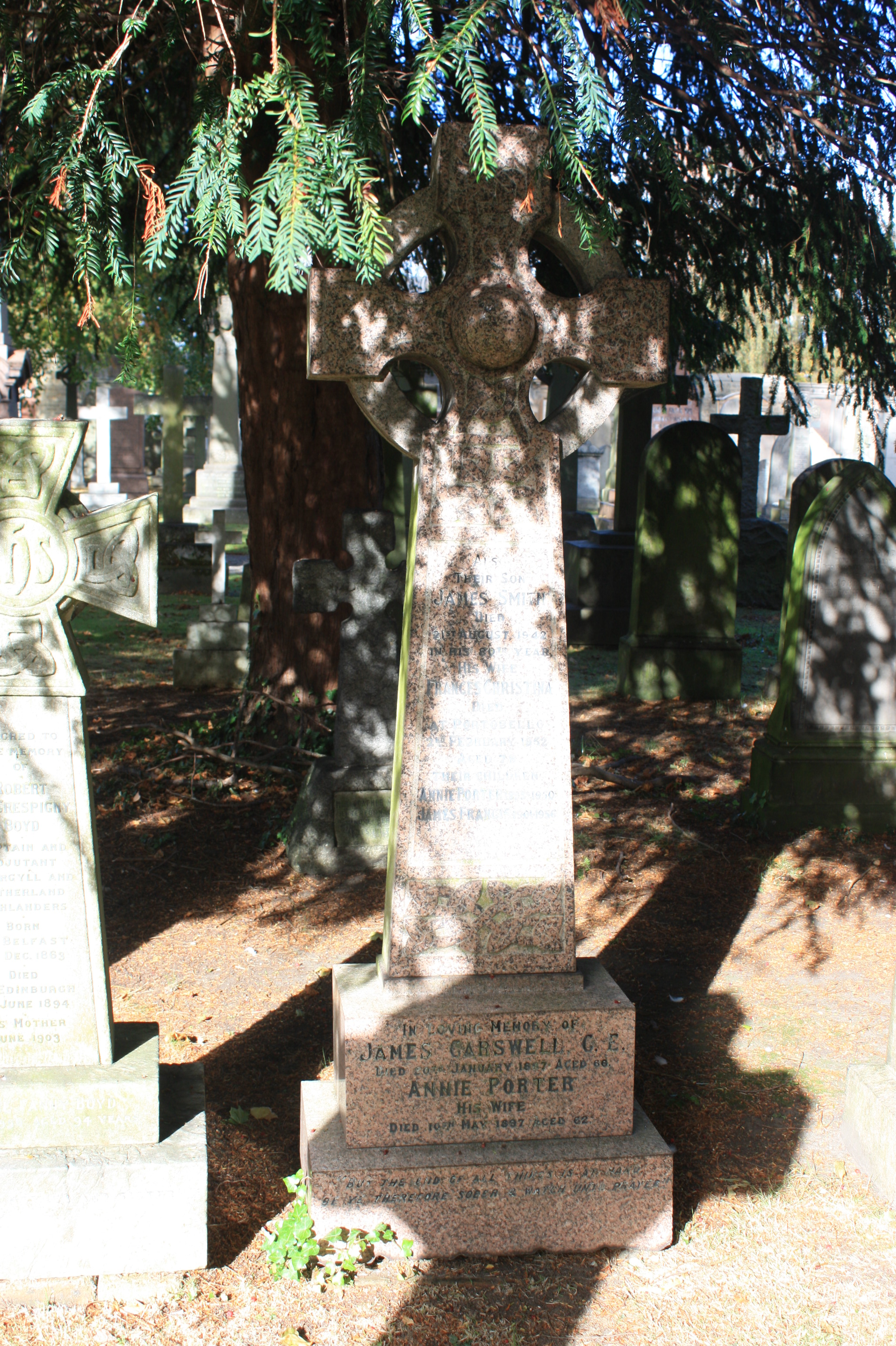
The grave of James Carswell, Dean Cemetery, Edinburgh

James Carswell (1830–1897) was a Scottish railway engineer largely remembered for his design of glazed roof on Queen Street Station, Glasgow and the huge approaches to the Forth Bridge.

== Life ==
He was born in Bonhill, Dunbartonshire in 1830 the son of Anne and Thomas P. Carswell. His father was an iron-founder and merchant and it is likely that he was initially apprenticed as an iron-founder. His depth and understanding of iron construction shows both a practical knowledge and a strong design understanding. In 1851 he moved with his family to 106 South Portland Street in the Gorbals in Glasgow. At this time James is described as a mining and land engineer. Here he began working as Resident Engineer for the Monklands Railways. Through amalgamation this then became the Edinburgh & Glasgow Railway before finally becoming the North British Railway in 1865.

In 1861 he was living with his wife and family in Chapel-en-le-Frith in Derbyshire doing project work in northern England. In 1879 he became Chief Engineer to the North British Railway. From 1882 he spent most of his time working on the huge engineering task of designing the approach structures to the Forth Rail Bridge. However, unlike the engineers of the bridge itself, he received no knighthood or indeed any other civil recognition.

In later life he lived at 7 Western Terrace in western Edinburgh.

He died aged 66 on 20 January 1897 at his son’s house, Killin House on St Thomas Road in the Grange, Edinburgh. His son James Smith Carswell (1862–1942) is described as a "steel manufacturer".

James senior is buried in the Dean Cemetery on the west side of the city in the northern Victorian extension. His wife and children lie with him. His father lies two plots to the west.

== Known works ==
- Rebuilding of the Edinburgh and Glasgow Railway Station (now known as Glasgow Queen Street railway station) (1878)
- Springburn railway station (1875)
- Approach bridges and engineering supporting the Forth Rail Bridge (1882–1890)
- Inverkeithing railway station (1890)
- Covered platforms at Haymarket railway station, Edinburgh (1894)
- Railway Workers Houses, Fort William (1895)
- Helensburgh Central railway station (1897) completed after his death

== Family ==
He was married to Annie Porter (1835–1897) who died a few months after he did.
