= Barnhill railway station =

Railway station in Glasgow, Scotland

Barnhill Scottish Gaelic: Cnoc an t-Sabhail
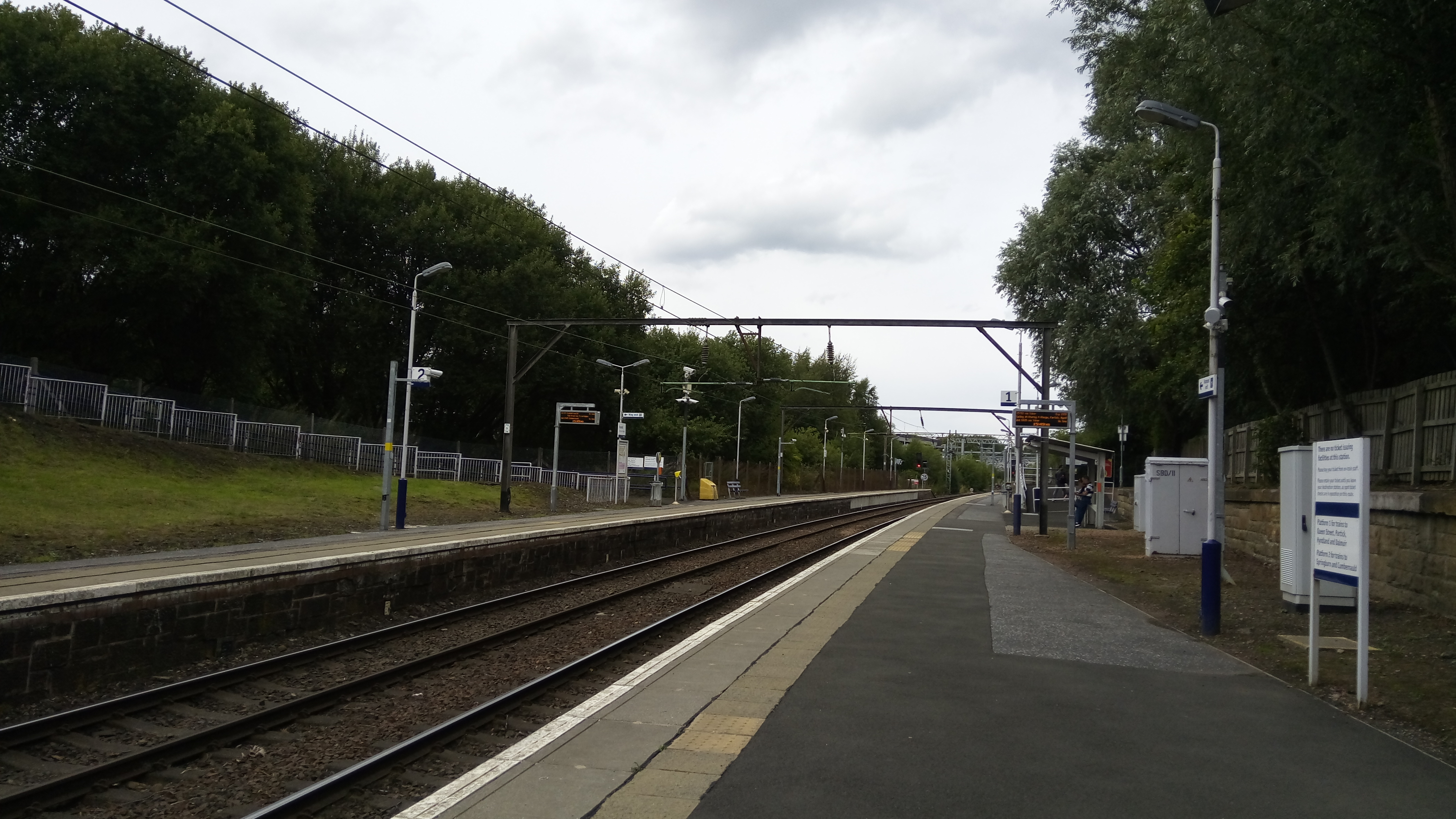

General information
- Location: Springburn, Glasgow; Scotland
- Coordinates: 55.8778°N 4.2235°W
- Grid reference: NS610671
- Manager: ScotRail
- Transit authority: SPT
- Platforms: 2

Other information
- Station code: BNL
- Fare zone: 1

History
- Original company: City of Glasgow Union Railway
- Pre-grouping: G&SWR & NBR
- Post-grouping: LMS & LNER

Key dates
- 1 October 1883: Opened

Passengers
- 2021/22: ▲42,560
- 2022/23: ▲54,494
- 2023/24: ▲72,366
- 2024/25: ▲84,686
- 2025/26: ▲99,516
Location
Notes
- Passenger statistics from the Office of Rail and Road

Barnhill railway station is in Glasgow, Scotland, 3 miles (5 km) north of Glasgow Queen Street railway station on the Springburn branch of the North Clyde Line. The station is managed by ScotRail.

It was built as part of the City of Glasgow Union Railway which provided a link across the Clyde (between the Glasgow and Paisley Joint Railway at Shields Junction and the Edinburgh and Glasgow Railway at Sighthill Junction). The line opened to goods traffic in 1875, but the station here was not opened until 1 October 1883, when the passenger service was extended from Alexandra Parade. Services through to Springburn were not introduced until 1887.

The Bellgrove to Springburn line was electrified by British Rail in 1960 as part of the North Clyde line scheme.

== Services 2023 ==
Monday to Saturday daytimes there is a half-hourly service from Barnhill to Glasgow Queen Street and beyond (usually to Dumbarton Central via Yoker) southbound and to Springburn northbound. Connections are available at the latter for stations further east.

Sundays see an hourly service between Partick and Springburn between 10am and 6pm, trains do not call before or after these times on a Sunday.

Preceding station	National Rail	Following station
Springburn	ScotRail; North Clyde Line	Alexandra Parade
	Historical railways	
Springburn; Line and Station open	City of Glasgow Union Railway; G&SWR and NBR	Garngad; Line open; Station closed
