= Helensburgh Central railway station =

Railway station in Argyll and Bute, Scotland

Helensburgh Central Scottish Gaelic: Baile Eilidh Meadhain
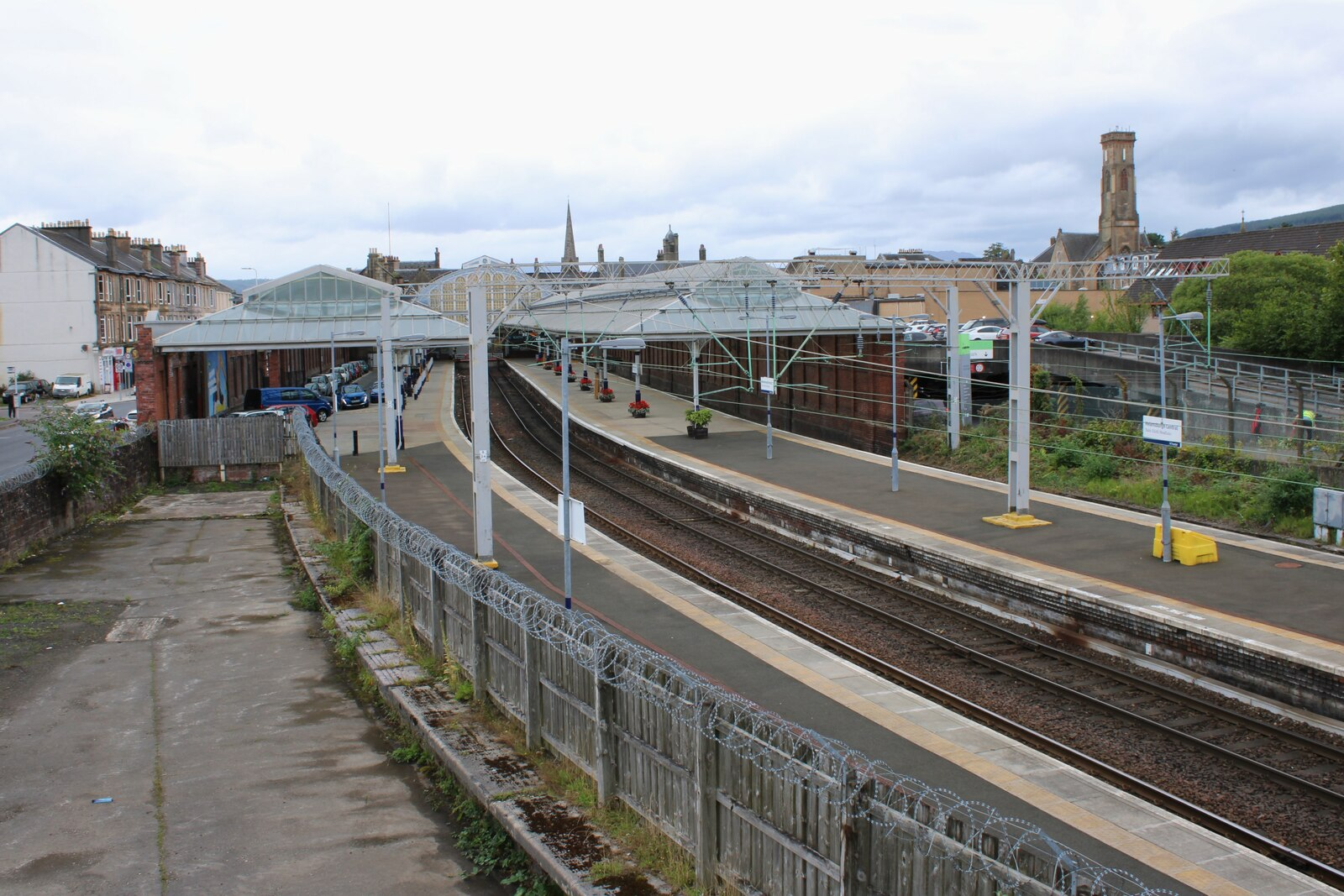
- The station seen in 2024

General information
- Location: Helensburgh, Argyll and Bute; Scotland
- Coordinates: 56.0038°N 4.7315°W
- Grid reference: NS297823
- Manager: ScotRail
- Transit authority: SPT
- Platforms: 3

Other information
- Station code: HLC
- Fare zone: D4

History
- Original company: Glasgow, Dumbarton and Helensburgh Railway
- Pre-grouping: North British Railway
- Post-grouping: LNER

Key dates
- 31 May 1858: Opened as Helensburgh
- 8 June 1953: Renamed Helensburgh Central

Passengers
- 2021/22: ▲0.371 million
- 2022/23: ▲0.500 million
- 2023/24: ▲0.628 million
- 2024/25: ▲0.671 million
- 2025/26: ▲0.681 million

Listed Building – Category B
- Designated: 21 March 2002
- Reference no.: LB48538
Location
Notes
- Passenger statistics from the Office of Rail and Road

Helensburgh Central railway station (Scottish Gaelic: Baile Eilidh Meadhain) serves the town of Helensburgh on the north shore of the Firth of Clyde, near Glasgow, Scotland. The station is a terminus on the North Clyde Line, sited 24 miles 31 chains (39.2 km) from Glasgow Queen Street (High Level), measured via Singer and Maryhill. Passenger services are operated by ScotRail on behalf of Strathclyde Partnership for Transport.

The station is Helensburgh's main railway station, the other being the much smaller Helensburgh Upper on the West Highland Line, which provides services to Oban, Fort William and Mallaig.

== History ==
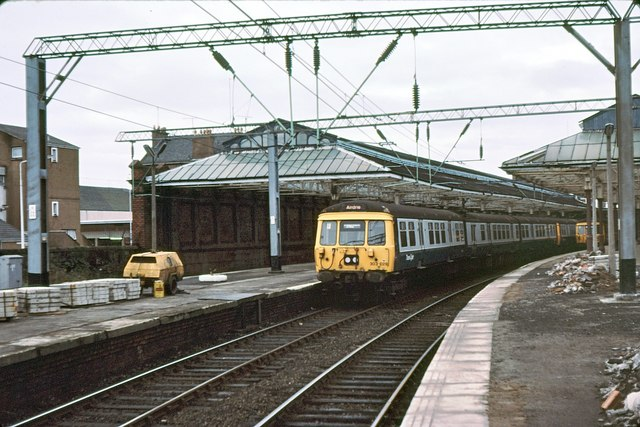
A Class 303 unit seen at the station in 1981

The station was opened on 31 May 1858 (as Helensburgh), as the terminus of the Glasgow, Dumbarton and Helensburgh Railway. The GD&HR was taken over by the Edinburgh and Glasgow Railway company in 1862, which in turn was absorbed by the North British Railway three years later. It was given its current name on 8 June 1953, with electric operation beginning in November 1960 as part of the North Clyde modernisation scheme. The entire station building and platforms were rebuilt in 1897 to the design of James Carswell.

== Facilities ==
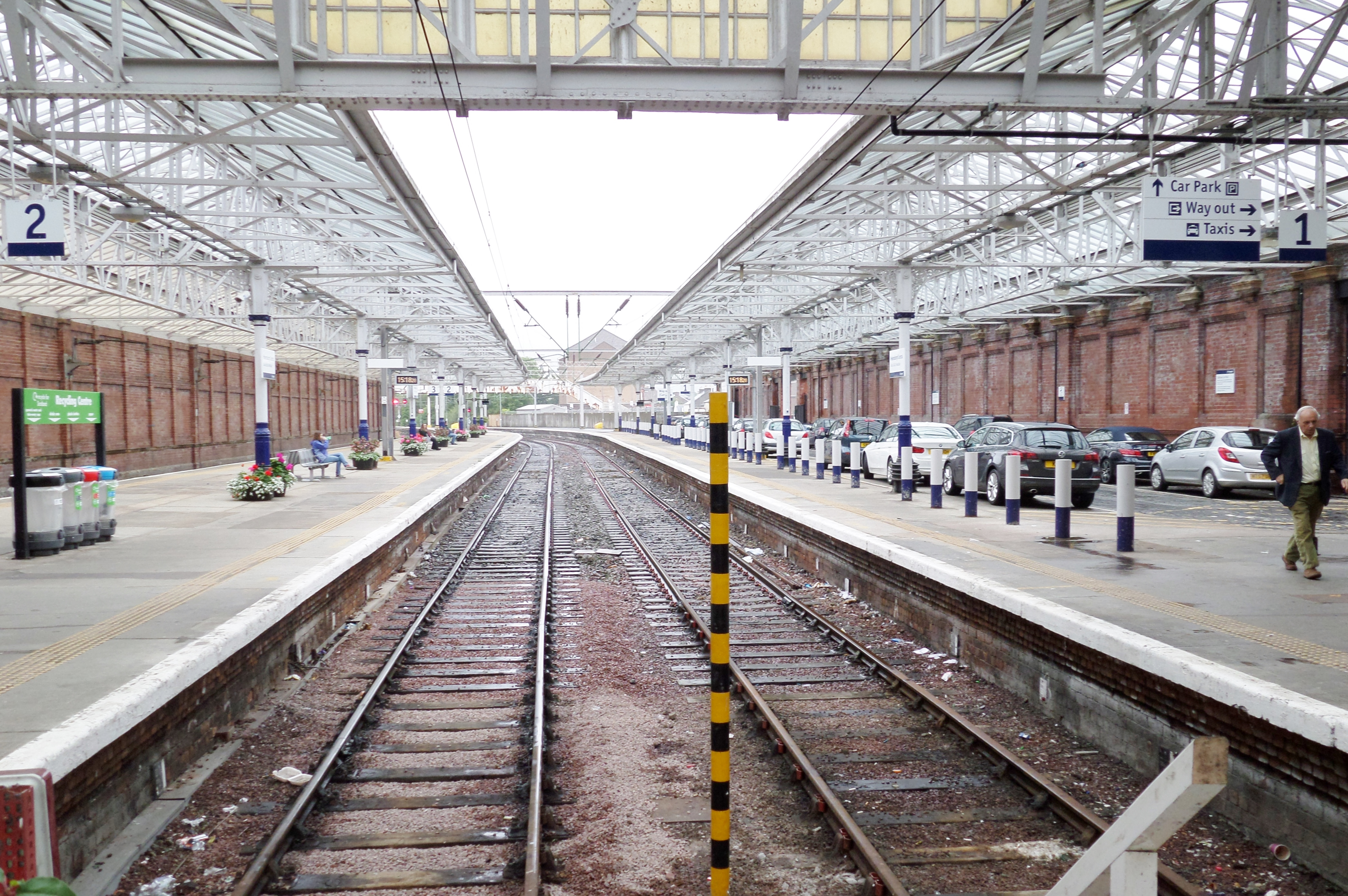
Platforms 1 and 2 at the station

The station has a ticket office, a coffee shop, an accessible toilet, waiting rooms, bike racks, various benches, payphones, a help point and a cash machine, as well as an accessible car park. All areas of the station have step-free access, except the Princes Street East entrance to the ticket hall.

== Passenger volume ==
Passenger Volume at Helensburgh Central
	2002–03	2004–05	2005–06	2006–07	2007–08	2008–09	2009–10	2010–11	2011–12	2012–13	2013–14	2014–15	2015–16	2016–17	2017–18	2018–19	2019–20	2020–21	2021–22	2022–23
Entries and exits	854,599	889,194	948,417	928,813	894,588	1,164,870	1,139,534	1,179,284	1,210,632	1,192,148	826,406	843,343	810,965	765,322	773,722	753,118	716,864	81,510	370,770	499,674
Interchanges	– (Note: No data available.)	180	57	49	45	90	8	25	37	36	31	264	181	168	308	238	48	19	43	45

The statistics cover twelve-month periods that start in April.

== Services ==
The typical off-peak service in trains per hour Mondays to Saturdays is:

- 2 tph to Edinburgh Waverley via Singer, Glasgow Queen Street, Airdrie and Bathgate (semi-fast)

On Sundays, the same service operates at the same frequency, but trains heading to Edinburgh Waverley serve all stations via Singer.

Preceding station	National Rail	Following station
Craigendoran	ScotRail; North Clyde Line	Terminus
	Historical railways	
Craigendoran; Line and Station open	Glasgow, Dumbarton and Helensburgh Railway; North British Railway	Terminus

== Bibliography ==
- Butt, R. V. J. (October 1995). The Directory of Railway Stations: details every public and private passenger station, halt, platform and stopping place, past and present (1st ed.). Sparkford: Patrick Stephens Ltd. ISBN 978-1-85260-508-7. OCLC 60251199. OL 11956311M.
- Jowett, Alan (March 1989). Jowett's Railway Atlas of Great Britain and Ireland: From Pre-Grouping to the Present Day (1st ed.). Sparkford: Patrick Stephens Ltd. ISBN 978-1-85260-086-0. OCLC 22311137.
- Quick, Michael (2022). Railway Passenger Stations in Great Britain: A Chronology (PDF) (5th ed.). London: Railway and Canal Historical Society.
- Yonge, John (May 1987). Gerald Jacobs (ed.). British Rail Track Diagrams - Book 1: ScotRail (1st ed.). Exeter: Quail Map Company. ISBN 0-9006-0948-6.
- Yonge, John (February 1993). Gerald Jacobs (ed.). Railway Track Diagrams - Book 1: Scotland and the Isle of Man (2nd ed.). Exeter: Quail Map Company. ISBN 0-9006-0995-8.
- Yonge, John (April 1996). Gerald Jacobs (ed.). Railway Track Diagrams - Book 1: Scotland and the Isle of Man (3rd ed.). Exeter: Quail Map Company. ISBN 1-8983-1919-7.
- Yonge, John (2007). Gerald Jacobs (ed.). Railway Track Diagrams - Book 1: Scotland & Isle of Man (Quail Track Plans) (fifth ed.). Bradford on Avon: Trackmaps (formerly Quail Map Co). ISBN 978-0-9549866-3-6. OCLC 79435248.
