= Glasgow Queen Street railway station =

Principal railway station in Glasgow, Scotland

Glasgow Queen Street Scottish Gaelic: Sràid na Banrighinn
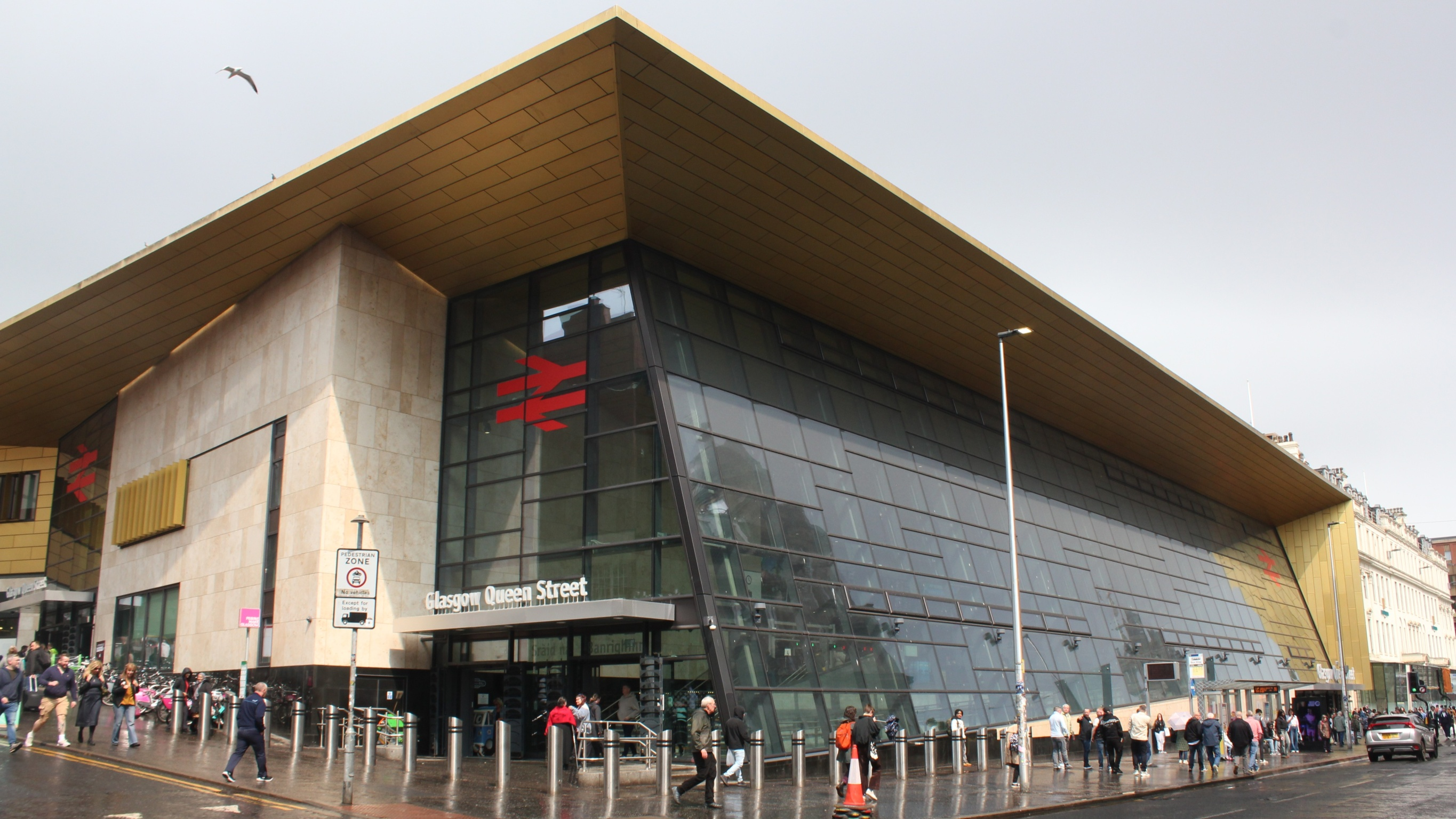
- Main entrance

General information
- Location: Glasgow; Scotland
- Coordinates: 55.8622°N 4.2512°W
- Grid reference: NS591655
- Manager: ScotRail
- Transit authority: SPT
- Platforms: 9 (2 on low level)

Other information
- Station code: GLQ
- Fare zone: 1

History
- Original company: Edinburgh and Glasgow Railway (High Level), Glasgow City and District Railway (Low Level)
- Pre-grouping: North British Railway
- Post-grouping: London and North Eastern Railway

Key dates
- 21 February 1842: High Level station opened
- 15 March 1886: Low Level station opened

Passengers
- 2021/22: ▲8.468 million
- 2022/23: ▲12.284 million
- 2023/24: ▲14.503 million
- 2024/25: ▲14.951 million
- Interchange: 2.009 million
- 2025/26: ▲15.435 million
- Interchange: ▲2.213 million
Location
Notes
- Passenger statistics from the Office of Rail and Road

Glasgow Queen Street (Scottish Gaelic: Sràid na Banrighinn) is a passenger railway terminus serving the city of Glasgow, Scotland. It is the smaller of the city's two main line terminals; the larger is Glasgow Central. Between April 2024 and March 2025, it was the third-busiest station in Scotland (after Central and Edinburgh Waverley) and the 30th-busiest in Great Britain.

The station serves mainly destinations in the Central Belt and Highlands of Scotland, with Glasgow Central covering destinations in the Lowlands of Scotland and cross-border services into England. Major lines on the station's terminal high-level platforms include the Glasgow–Edinburgh via Falkirk line to Edinburgh Waverley, the principal and fastest route from Glasgow-Edinburgh. Other lines include the West Highland Line for services to and from Oban, Fort William and Mallaig, as well as the Highland Main Line and Glasgow–Dundee line for services to Stirling, Inverness, Dundee and Aberdeen. On the station's through low-level platforms is the suburban North Clyde line, running west to Milngavie, Dumbarton Central, Balloch and Helensburgh Central, and east to Springburn, Airdrie, Bathgate and Edinburgh Waverley (although this is slower than the line via Falkirk).

The station is located between George Street to the south and Cathedral Street Bridge to the north; it is at the northern end of Queen Street adjacent to George Square, Glasgow's major civic square. It is also a short walk from Buchanan Street, Glasgow's main shopping district and the location of Buchanan Street subway station, the closest connection to Queen Street for the Glasgow Subway network.

The station underwent major redevelopment works by Network Rail in the late 2010s. In October 2017, a £120 million project began on bringing the station up to modern standards, demolishing many of the 1960s buildings and replacing them with a new station concourse, which was completed in 2021.

== History ==
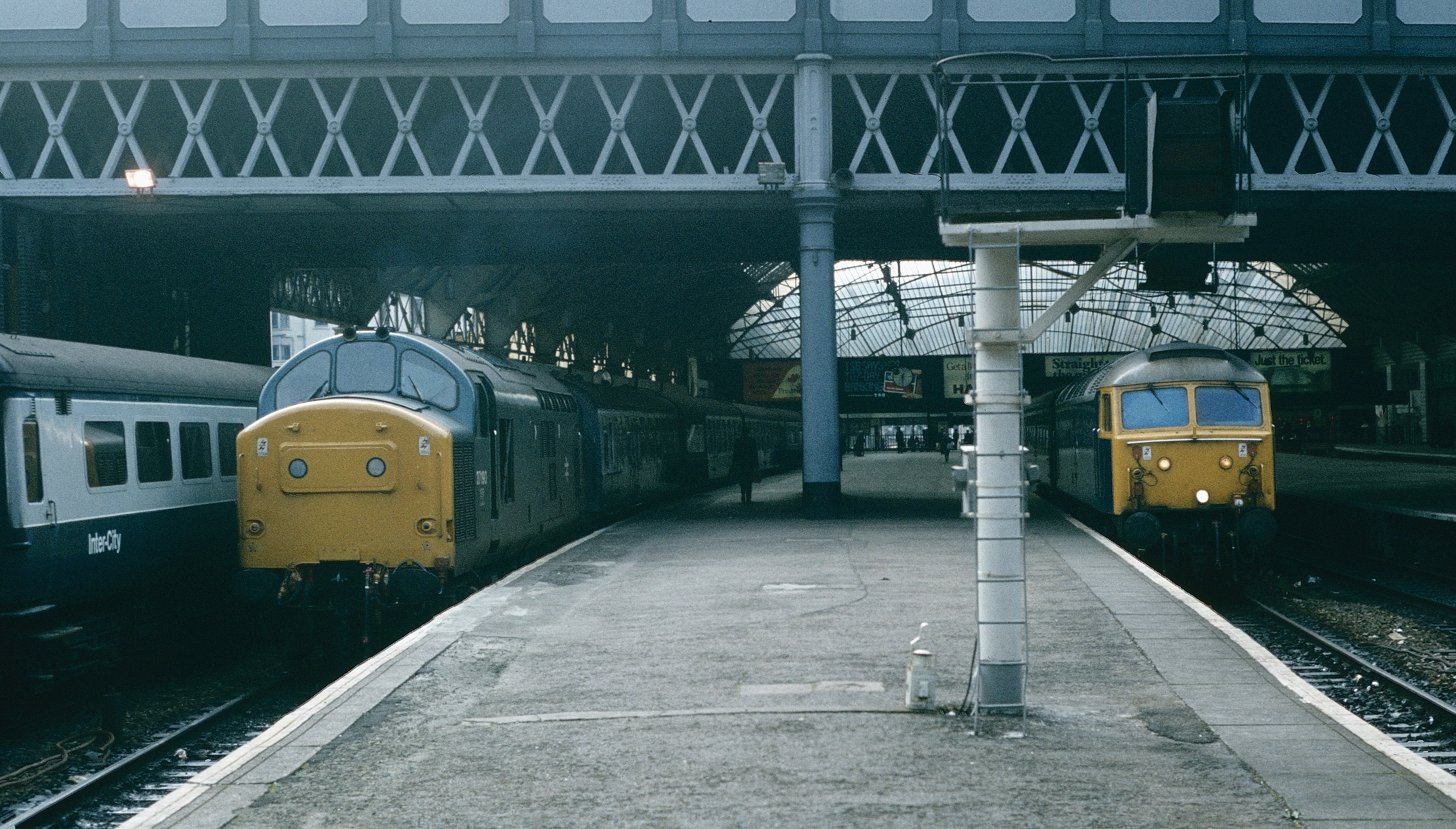
Queen Street station (1982)

The station was built by the Edinburgh and Glasgow Railway; it opened on 21 February 1842 as Dundas Street, before being renamed as Queen Street, although the train shed (curved glass roof) wasn't completed until 1878. In 1865, the E&GR was absorbed into the North British Railway. In 1878, the entire station was redesigned by James Carswell. Carswell introduced electric lighting at the station: one of the earliest uses of electricity in Glasgow. The North British became part of the London and North Eastern Railway group in 1923.

The climb through the tunnel to Cowlairs is at 1 in 42 and trains were hauled by a rope operated by a stationary engine until 1909, although experiments were carried out using banking engines in 1844–48. Modern diesel and electric trains have no difficulty with the climb.

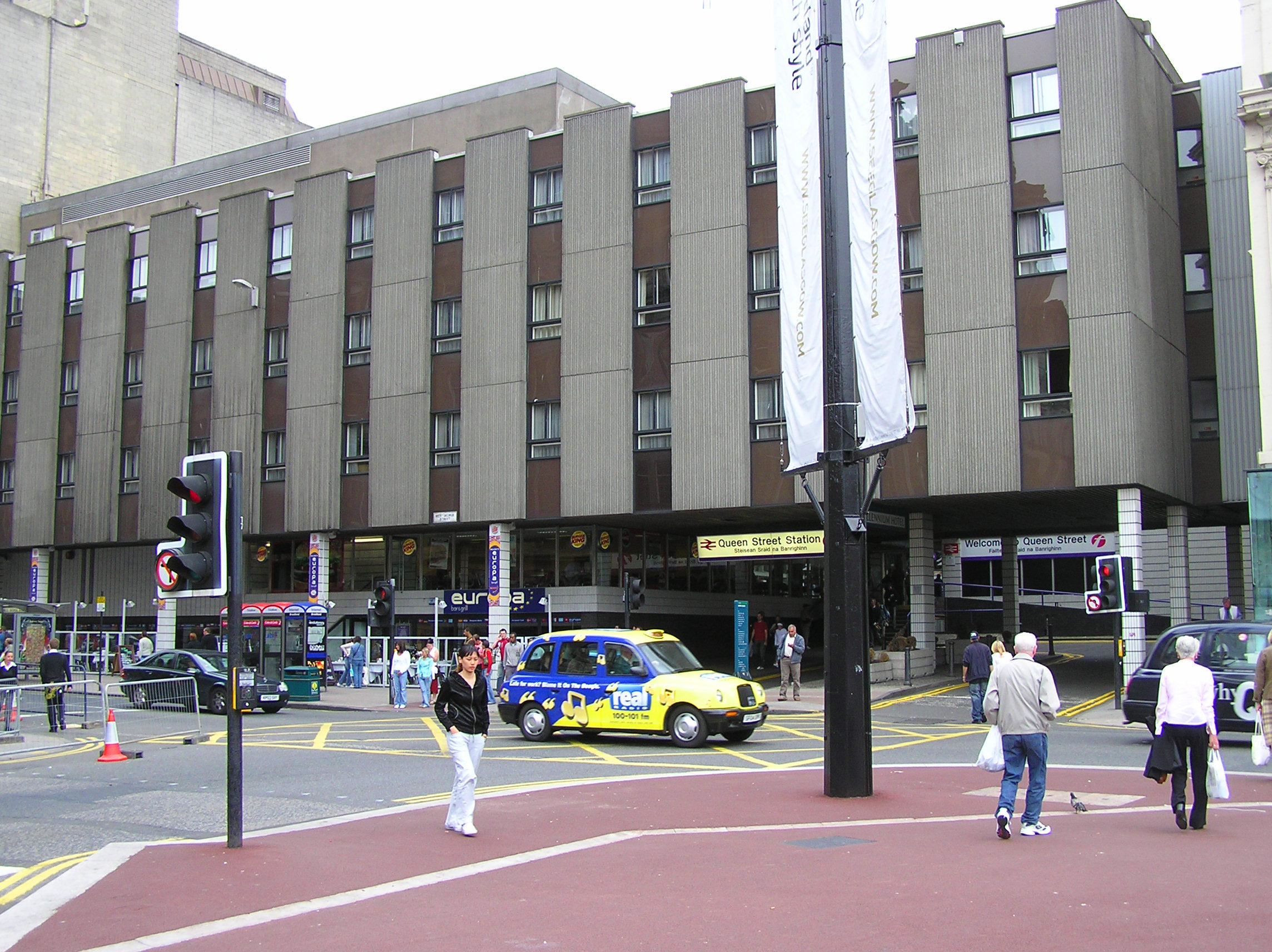
The station entrance before redevelopment (2004)

The adjacent Buchanan Street station of the rival Caledonian Railway closed on 7 November 1966, as a result of the Beeching cuts, and its services to and from Stirling, Perth, Inverness, Dundee and Aberdeen transferred to Queen Street. This caused difficulties with longer trains, as Queen Street is in a confined position between George Square and the tunnel. Buchanan Street was demolished the following year.

In the 1980s, High Speed Trains were used on Cross Country and East Coast services run by InterCity. These used platform 7, with the end of the train being close to the tunnel mouth.

Minor refurbishment, including internal repainting and new flooring, took place throughout the 2000s. In 2008, the CRT information screens were replaced by LED information boards similar to, but smaller than, those used at Glasgow Central. Eco LED screens, supplied by Infotec Displays, were installed in 2020.

In 2009, the Scottish Government announced that the Glasgow to Edinburgh via Falkirk Line would be electrified by 2017. Overhead line electrification lines have been installed on the high level platforms of Queen Street, with Class 380 electric multiple units operating from the station from December 2017 and Class 385s as of autumn 2018. As part of this work, the High Level station was closed for 20 weeks (from 20 March to 8 August 2016) to allow 1,800 m (5,900 ft) of track in Queen Street Tunnel (and all of the tracks and platforms in the station itself) to be replaced. Services were diverted over various routes during this period, with some trains running to/from the Low Level station and others to/from Glasgow Central station (via Cumbernauld, Coatbridge and Carmyle).

=== Expansion ===
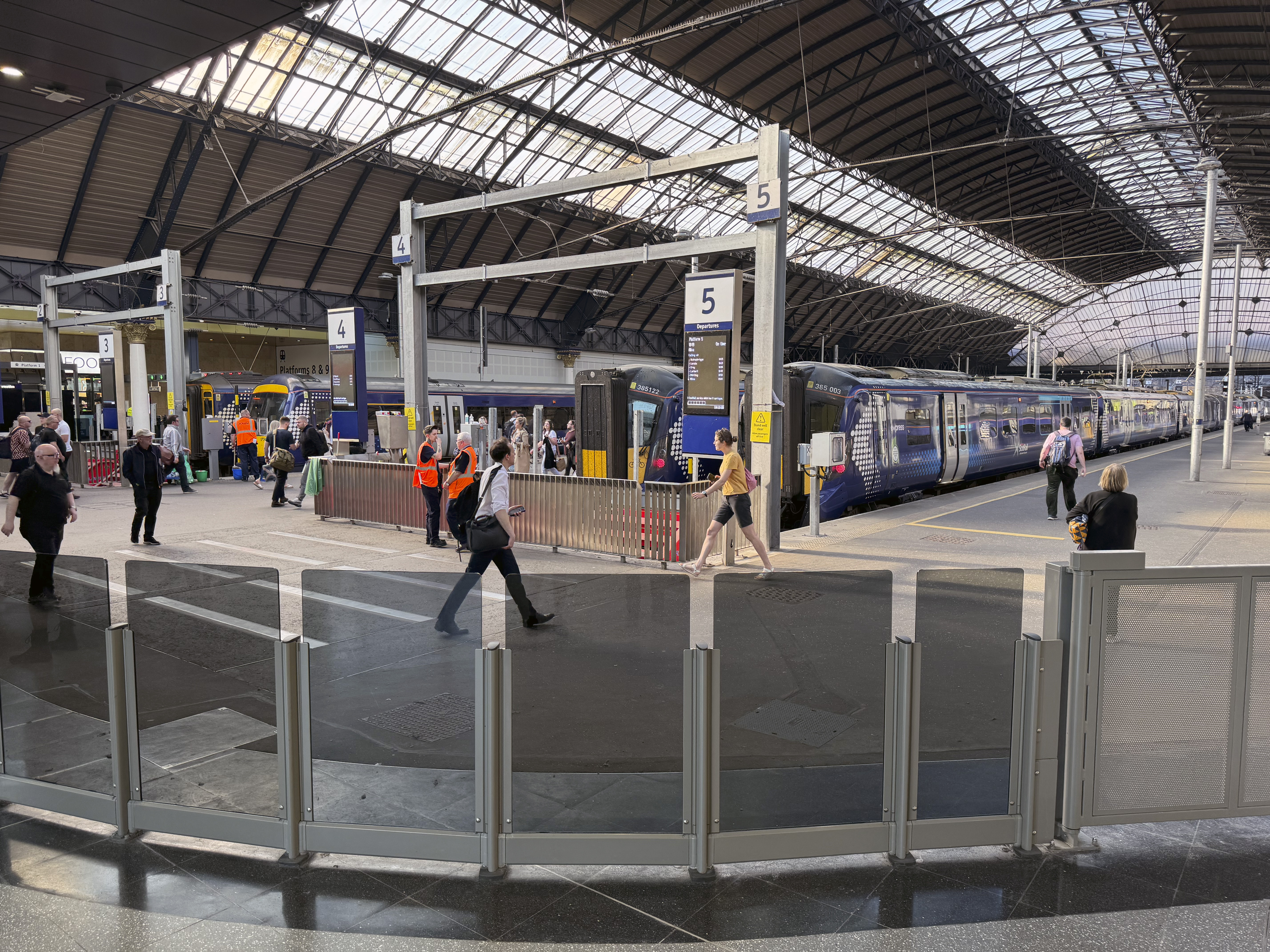
The main concourse post-electrification (2024)

In August 2006, Network Rail revealed that it intended to redevelop Queen Street substantially, making use of the Hanover Street car park area to provide more retail space, and to upgrade the station's entrances and to provide escalators down to the lower-level platforms. More plans were unveiled in September 2011 by Network Rail, along with an announcement that the owner of the Buchanan Galleries shopping mall, Land Securities, had been chosen as development partner for the station alongside Henderson Group. This saw the 1970s hotel extension (which, until recently, fronted the George Square entrance of the station) demolished and replaced by a glass atrium. The previous plans of developing the airspace rights above the North Hanover Street car park into an expanded retail and restaurant area will be carried forward; it will form part of the proposed extension to the Buchanan Galleries, which will gain direct access to the station concourse.

In August 2017, work began on the £120 million redevelopment of the station which, at the time, was expected to be completed by December 2019, but was pushed back until 2020 due to delays in receiving approval. Platforms 2 through 5 were subsequently extended in 2019, to accommodate longer trains introduced as part of the Edinburgh to Glasgow Improvement Programme (EGIP). Demolition of surrounding buildings was completed in October 2018 to accommodate the lengthened platforms and an expanded concourse.

Following demolition of the surrounding Consort House buildings, the frontage of the original Victorian era train shed was uncovered after more than 40 years. The shed is a Category A Listed Structure and work on the station was undertaken subsequently with care to integrate the historic structure into its new surroundings.

The work was officially completed on 4 October 2021, which also marked the end of EGIP. In September 2024, the expansion project won an industry award, with judges praising the "station's striking design and the recent integration of the high and low-level stations."

In May 2021, a planning proposal was submitted to add a new plaza and mezzanine on the North Hanover Street side of the station. The application was granted in December 2024. In August 2025, Network Rail unveiled their development plan with public consultations to start in autumn 2025.

In July 2025, the Office of Rail and Road (ORR) approved plans for Lumo, an open-access operator, to extend its existing East Coast service, from Edinburgh Waverley to Queen Street, via Falkirk High. A daily service on the route started in December with two trains northbound and one train southbound.

=== Accidents and incidents ===
- On 24 January 1912, at 14:15, shunter W Wylie was crushed between a train and the platform. He died from his injuries two days later.
- On 29 April 1914, at 11.45, porter John Burke was killed whilst he and a colleague were filling lavatory water tanks on passenger coaches. He was crushed between the buffers of two coaches on the adjacent line.
- On 12 October 1928, an Edinburgh–Glasgow express rolled down through the tunnel on greasy rails and collided with an empty train being shunted from a siding. Three people were killed, with a further 52 suffering injuries and shock.

== Layout ==
Queen Street station is split across two levels, with the high-level platforms running directly north–south and the low-level running east–west. They are connected by staircases at either end of the low-level platforms and by lifts accessible from platform 7 on the high level.

=== High level ===
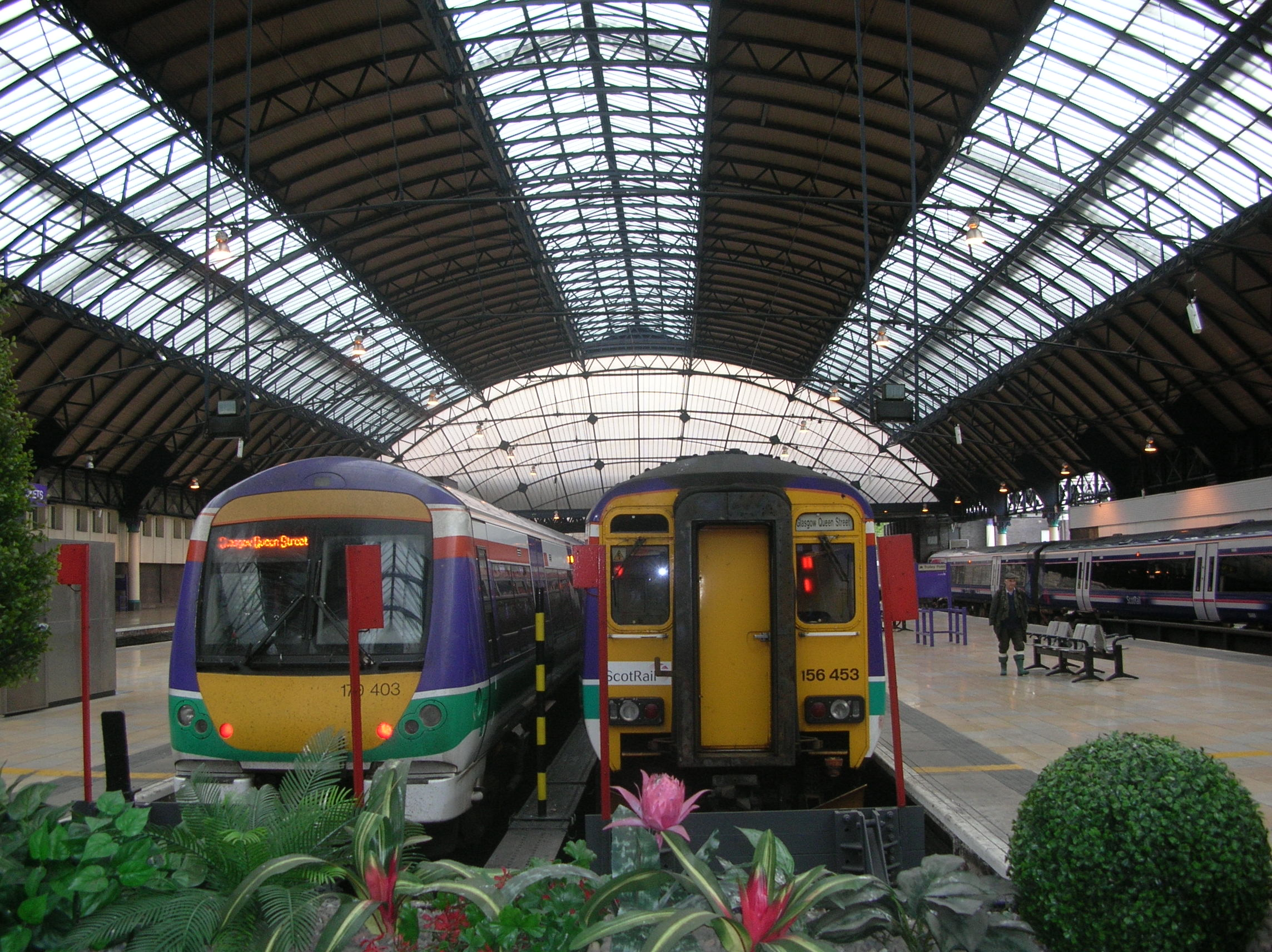
High level platforms with trains in former ScotRail National Express livery (2005)

The High Level station is the larger of the two levels; it is the terminus for the Edinburgh via Falkirk services and all routes north of the Central Belt run by ScotRail. The high level railway approaches the station building through the Queen Street Tunnel, which runs beneath the Buchanan Galleries shopping centre to the Sighthill area north-east of the city centre. Platforms 1–7 occupy the High Level, platform 1 being at the western end of the trainshed and being considerably shorter; it is usually only used for local stopping services. Since the electrification of several of the routes from the High level station (Edinburgh to Glasgow via Falkirk High, and to Stirling, Dunblane and Alloa), the fleet is largely electric, using the new Class 385 trains.

=== Low level ===
Low level station (2026)

Platforms 8 and 9 comprise the Low Level station and it is the most central stop on the North Clyde Line of the Glasgow suburban electric network. Trains run frequently between Helensburgh on the Firth of Clyde, Balloch and suburban Milngavie to Airdrie, on the eastern edge of the Greater Glasgow conurbation and onward to Edinburgh, via Bathgate and Livingston. The line is electrified; the fleet operating this route are Class 318s, Class 320s and Class 334s.

Services on the West Highland Line to Oban, Fort William and Mallaig occasionally use the Low Level station when the main route into the High Level is unavailable due to engineering work. As of September 2014, the Fort William to London Euston overnight sleeper also calls here instead of Westerton in the north-western suburbs; this eliminates the need for those travelling between Glasgow and Fort William, and between Glasgow and London Euston, on the sleeper to change there. These services are pick-up only northbound and drop-off only southbound, meaning passengers cannot use these trains to travel from Glasgow Queen Street to London Euston, with an alternative sleeper service available from Glasgow Central instead. This is now the only locomotive-hauled train to call here.

The Low Level line between High Street, Queen Street and Charing Cross was built before the Glasgow Subway, making it the oldest underground railway in the city. In May–June 2014, work was carried out to redevelop the Low Level platforms, which now have new compliant seating.

== Services ==
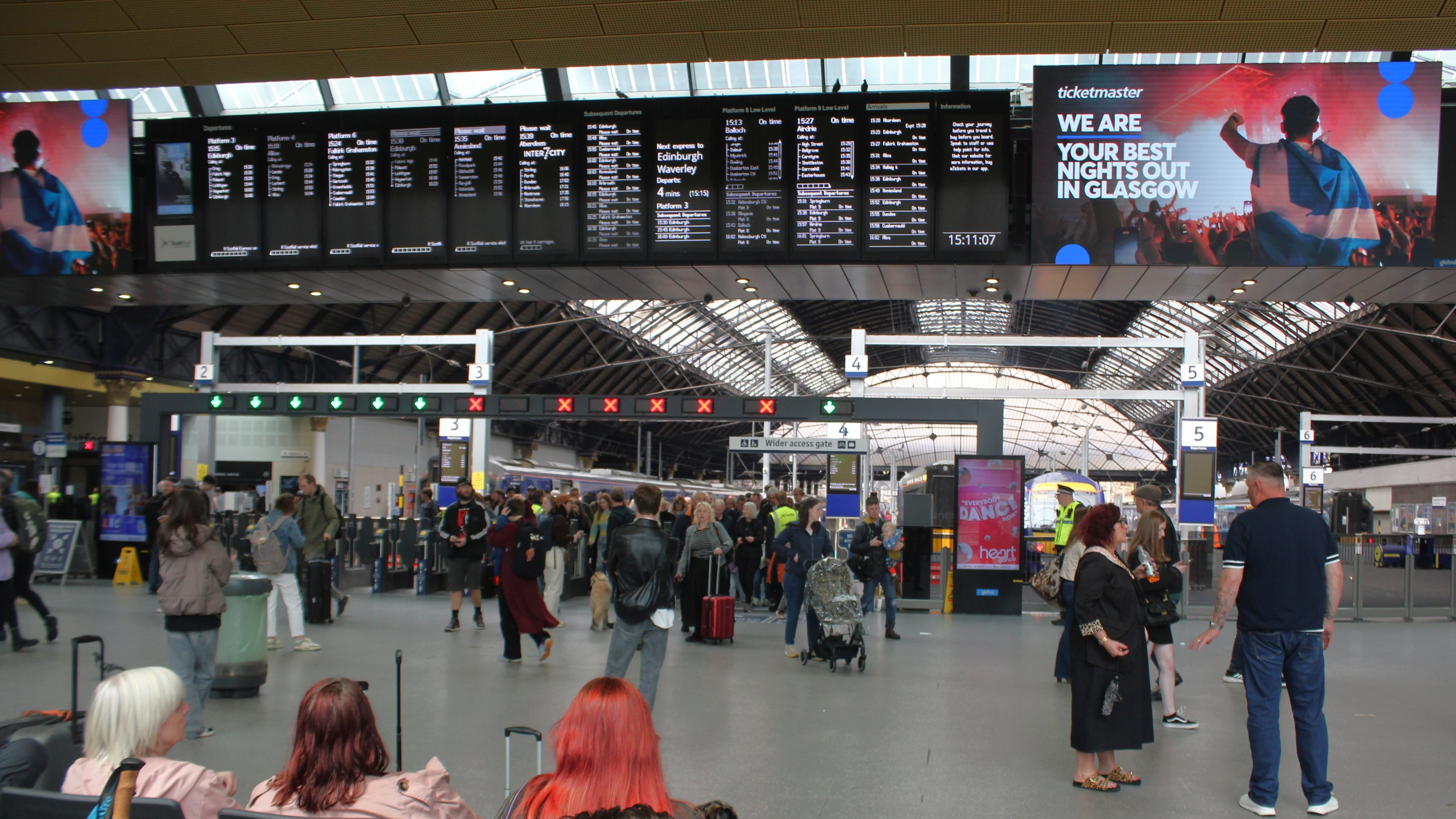
Interior of the new concourse (2025)

The station is served by three train operating companies; the typical off-peak weekday service in trains per hour/day (tph/tpd) is:

ScotRail:

High-Level:

- 2 tph to Edinburgh Waverley, via Croy and Falkirk High
- 1 tph to Cumbernauld, via Springburn
- 1 tph to Falkirk Grahamston, via Springburn and Cumbernauld
- 1 tph to Anniesland, via Maryhill
- 6 tpd to Oban, via Crianlarich and Dalmally
- 4 tpd to Mallaig, via Crianlarich and Fort William; of which:
  - 2 tpd terminate at Fort William
- 2 tph to Alloa, via Croy and Stirling
- 1 tph to Aberdeen, via Stirling, Perth and Dundee
- 1 tph to Dundee, via Stirling and Perth
- 1tp2h to Inverness, via Stirling, Perth and Aviemore
- 1 tp2h to Dundee, via Stirling, Perth and Invergowrie.

Low-Level:

- 2 tph to Edinburgh Waverley, via Airdrie and Bathgate
- 2 tph to Helensburgh Central, via Hyndland and Dumbarton Central
- 2 tph to Balloch, via Singer and Dumbarton Central
- 2 tph to Airdrie, via Bellgrove and Coatbridge Sunnyside
- 2 tph to Milngavie, via Anniesland and Hillfoot
- 2 tph to Springburn, via Bellgrove and Barnhill.

Caledonian Sleeper:

- 1 tpd to Fort William, via Crianlarich (operates Monday-Saturday mornings)
- 1 tpd to London Euston, via Edinburgh Waverley and Crewe (Monday-Saturday mornings).

Lumo:

- 1 tpd to London Kings Cross, via Falkirk High, Edinburgh Waverley and Newcastle. Note: two trains per day operate northbound

Preceding station	National Rail	Following station
High Street	ScotRail; North Clyde Line	Charing Cross
Terminus	ScotRail; West Highland Line	Dalmuir
Terminus	ScotRail; Croy Line	Bishopbriggs
Terminus	ScotRail; Cumbernauld Line	Springburn
Terminus	ScotRail; Maryhill Line	Ashfield
Terminus	ScotRail; Glasgow–Edinburgh via Falkirk line	Croy
Terminus	ScotRail; Glasgow to Aberdeen line	Stirling
Terminus	ScotRail; Highland Main Line	Stirling
Edinburgh Waverley	Caledonian Sleeper; Highland Caledonian Sleeper	Dalmuir
Terminus	Lumo; Glasgow to London King's Cross, via Newcastle	Falkirk High
	Historical railways	
Glasgow High Street; Line and Station open	North British Railway; Glasgow City and District Railway	Charing Cross; Line and Station open
Terminus	North British Railway; Edinburgh and Glasgow Railway	Cowlairs; Line open; Station closed

== Signalling ==
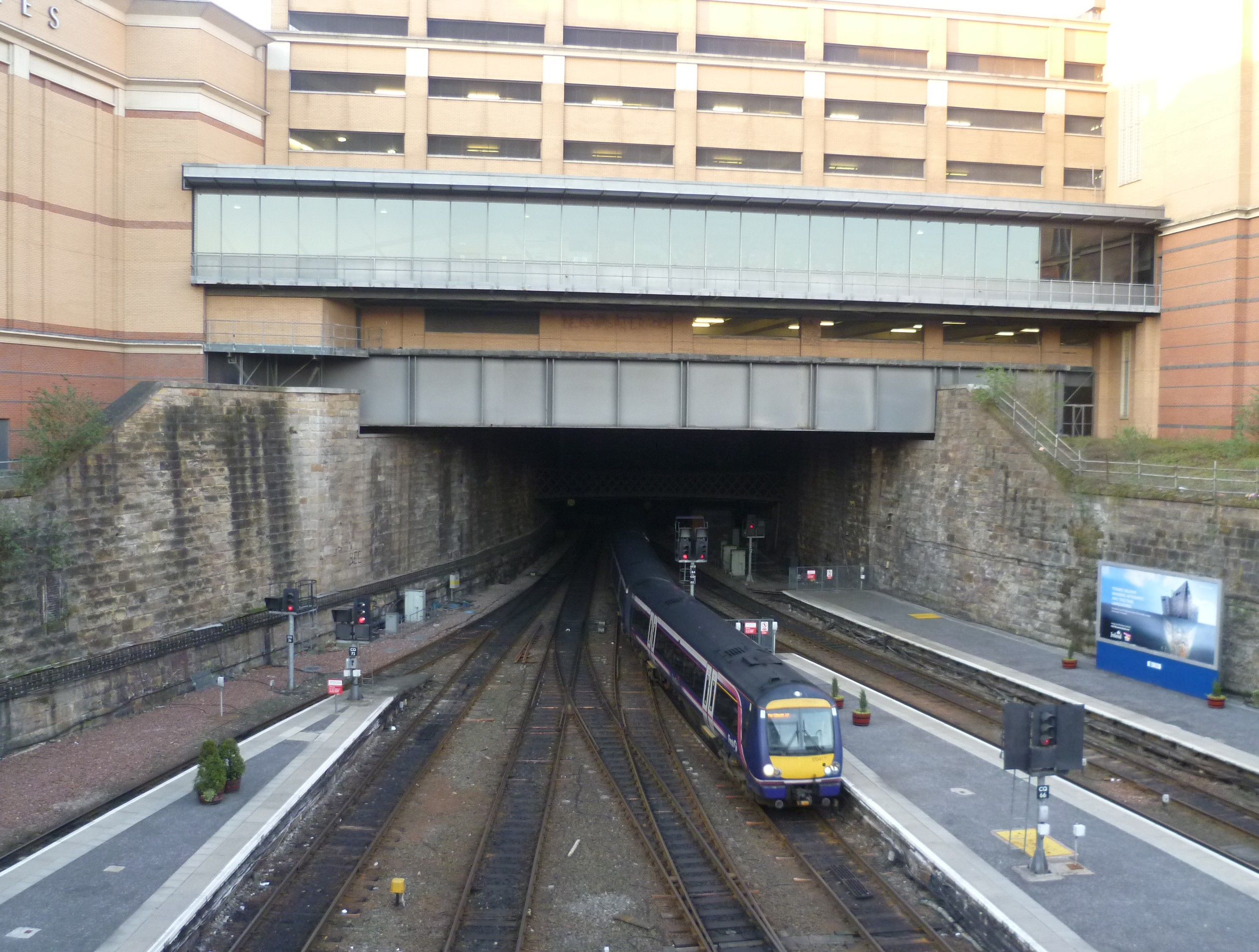
Train arriving at the station (2012)

Queen Street signal box, opened in 1881, was on a gantry spanning the tracks close to the tunnel mouth. It closed on 26 February 1967, when control of the high level station was transferred to a panel in Cowlairs signal box; that box was superseded by the new Cowlairs signalling centre on 28 December 1998. This, in turn, was abolished in October 2013 and the station is now under the supervision of Edinburgh Integrated Electronic Control Centre (IECC), which will eventually become the Edinburgh Rail Operating Centre.

The low level station had two signal boxes, Queen Street West and Queen Street East. Both boxes were over the tracks and closed on 8 February 1960. The low level lines came under the control of Yoker IECC on 19 November 1989.

== Proposals ==
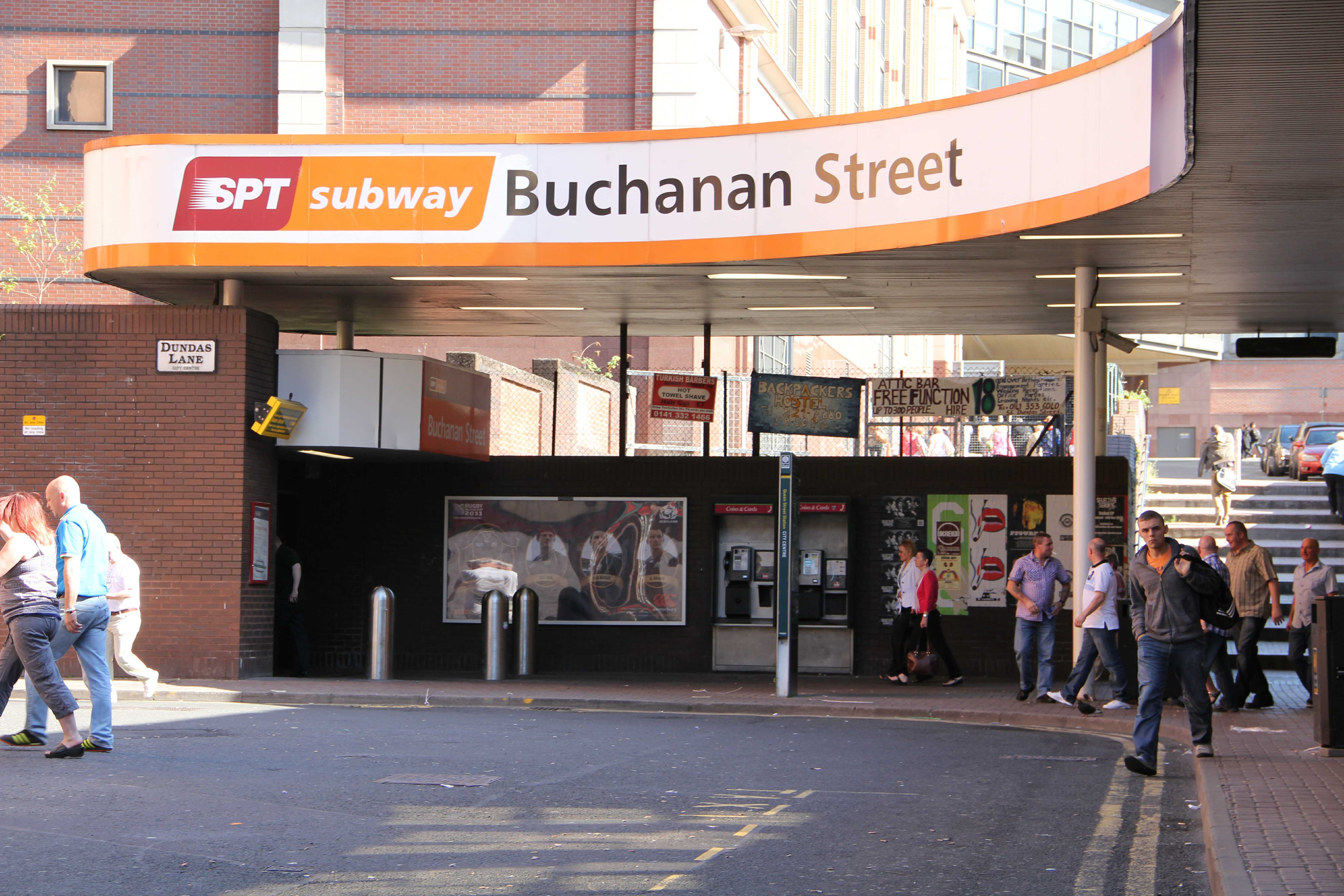
Dundas Street connection to Buchanan Street subway station, with former SPT Subway livery (2011); this canopy has since been demolished as part of the station's redevelopment

Various schemes to link Queen Street with Central station have been considered, as passengers travelling from the north of Scotland to the south and vice versa via Glasgow have to traverse the city centre either on foot or by road. A bus link connects the two stations, which also calls at the city's Buchanan bus station, use of which is free to rail passengers making a cross-Glasgow transfer on a through ticket. Neither of Glasgow's main line terminals is directly served by the Glasgow Subway, although a moving walkway was installed between Queen Street and the immediately adjacent Buchanan Street subway station during the system's modernisation in 1980. Planned expansion work of Buchanan Galleries Shopping Centre is expected to "subtly envelope" the Subway connection to redevelop the neglected Dundas Street.

One option to allow cross-Glasgow rail journeys would be Crossrail Glasgow, using a former passenger line (now used only for freight) that links High Street to the Gorbals area. This initiative was reviewed favourably, but progress has been stalled indefinitely as of 2009. Alternative proposals envisage a new city centre station (possibly in a tunnel underneath the city centre) or a light rail / metro system.

The Glasgow Connectivity Commission, established by the Glasgow City Council in 2017, has proposed the construction of a cross-city centre tunnel akin to the Stockholm City Line to connect the two termini. If the plans are approved, a new intermediate underground station will also be built.
