= Springburn railway station =

Railway station in Glasgow, Scotland

Springburn Scottish Gaelic: Allt an Fhuarain
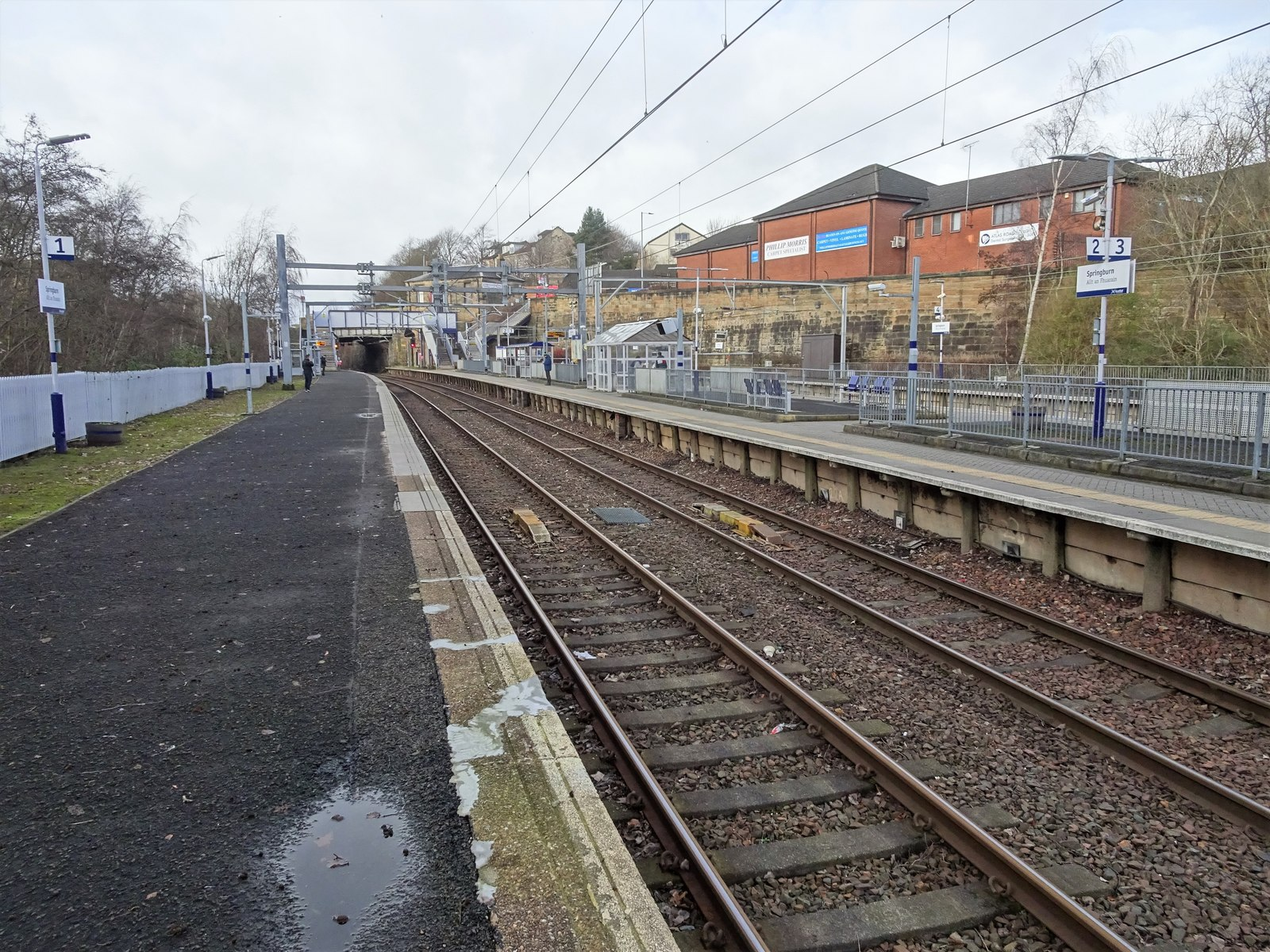

General information
- Location: Springburn, Glasgow; Scotland
- Coordinates: 55.8816°N 4.2296°W
- Grid reference: NS606676
- Manager: ScotRail
- Transit authority: SPT
- Platforms: 4

Other information
- Station code: SPR
- Fare zone: 1

Key dates
- 1887: Opened

Passengers
- 2021/22: ▲0.193 million
- Interchange: ▲5,915
- 2022/23: ▲0.259 million
- Interchange: ▲10,425
- 2023/24: ▲0.340 million
- Interchange: ▲13,374
- 2024/25: ▲0.386 million
- Interchange: ▲25,722
- 2025/26: ▲0.432 million
- Interchange: ▼15,290
Location
Notes
- Passenger statistics from the Office of Rail and Road

Springburn railway station serves the Springburn district of Glasgow, Scotland. The station is 1 1/4 miles (2.0 km) north of Glasgow Queen Street (High level) station on the Cumbernauld Line and is a terminus of the Springburn branch, a spur from Bellgrove station, on the North Clyde Line.

The station was first built by the City of Glasgow Union Railway, whose branch line from Bellgrove opened to goods traffic in 1875. A station building was designed by the engineer James Carswell in 1875 and was opened in 1887, when passenger traffic then began operating. Initially built as a terminus, two through platforms were added shortly afterwards by the company when they gained running powers over the Sighthill Branch of the Edinburgh and Glasgow Railway, which ran alongside the CGUR at this location. The link into this line gave the company access to both the E&G main line at Cowlairs and also the former Garnkirk and Glasgow Railway, which had now become the main Caledonian Railway route from Glasgow Buchanan Street to NE Scotland via Cumbernauld and Stirling. Several different passenger routes operated from the station, including workers' trains to Singer on the Glasgow, Dumbarton and Helensburgh Railway and a circular service that also used the Stobcross Railway and the GD&HR. The CGUR was absorbed jointly by the North British and Glasgow and South Western Railway in 1896, with the former company taking over the Bellgrove to Springburn branch.

The line from Bellgrove was electrified in November 1960 as part of the North Clyde scheme, but regular services northward to Cowlairs ended in 1963, when the workers' trains to Singer were withdrawn. However, three years later, trains from Cumbernauld were re-routed here with the closure of the Buchanan Street terminus to passenger traffic. Passengers had to change onto the North Clyde Line at Springburn to reach the city, as there was no direct route at that time to Queen Street main line station. Normal practice therefore was to operate a Cumbernauld to Springburn shuttle service which connected with the North Clyde line trains. Through running eventually commenced in 1989, albeit with a reversal in a loop alongside the carriage sidings and depot at Eastfield to begin with.

Cumbernauld Line trains are now able to run directly to Queen Street High Level via the Cowlairs Chord – a single-track south-to-east curve that was opened in 1993 by British Rail. The line has now been electrified as part of the Edinburgh to Glasgow Improvement Programme.

Springburn station has kept its four platforms, with two used by through trains and the others by terminating services from Bellgrove and points west. Two through goods lines used to run past the station to the west; these formed the original E&G Sighthill branch. They were latterly used to access the goods yard at Sighthill prior to its closure in October 1981, as well as to access St. Rollox railway works but they have since been lifted.

The station building was designed by James Carsewell – it is now protected as a category B listed building.

== Services ==
=== 2006/07 ===
On the Cumbernauld Line Mondays to Saturdays there is a half-hourly service from Springburn to Glasgow Queen Street southbound and to Cumbernauld northbound (hourly to Falkirk Grahamston). On Sundays there is an hourly service in each direction.

On the North Clyde Line Mondays to Saturdays there is a half-hourly service to Glasgow Queen Street (Low Level) and beyond to Dalmuir and Balloch. There is no service on Sundays and Bank Holidays.

=== 2013/14 ===
A half-hourly service remains in operation on the Cumbernauld Line (with hourly extensions to Falkirk Grahamston) and the North Clyde line. Services on the latter run to Dalmuir via Yoker during the daytime and Balloch via Singer in the evenings. On Sundays there is an hourly service to Cumbernauld only - there are no trains to Falkirk or on the North Clyde Line.

From 18 May 2014, North Clyde line services will be extended every half-hour to Cumbernauld (after a reversal here) with the start of electric operation on that route. This will replace one of the two current services from Queen Street HL to Cumbernauld each hour, though the existing hourly DMU service between Falkirk Grahamston and Queen Street High Level will also remain in operation. On Sundays, the present hourly service will remain, but it will be provided by EMUs and run to and from Partick via Queen Street LL.

=== 2016 ===
As noted above there are two trains per hour between Cumbernauld and Dalmuir via Yoker each way that call here on Mondays to Saturdays, along with the hourly DMU service between Queen Street H.L. and Falkirk Grahamston (the EMUs now continue to Dumbarton Central since the May 2016 timetable change). On Sundays there is an hourly service to Cumbernauld and Partick. Between March and August 2016, the service was modified further due to engineering work temporarily closing Queen Street High Level.

=== 2018/19 ===
From December 2018, a new half hourly Glasgow - Edinburgh via Cumbernauld and Falkirk Grahamston service will start, replacing the hourly DMU service and take over the existing EMU service between Springburn and Cumbernauld. The new service will use new Class 385 EMUs with the Springburn – Dumbarton Central service using existing Class 318, 320 and 334 stock. On Sundays however trains run between Springburn and Partick only.

Preceding station	National Rail	Following station
Terminus	ScotRail; North Clyde Line	Barnhill
Glasgow Queen Street	ScotRail; Cumbernauld Line	Robroyston
	Historical railways	
End on connection with E&GR	City of Glasgow Union Railway; G&SWR and NBR	Barnhill
Bishopbriggs	Edinburgh and Glasgow Railway; North British Railway	End on connection with CofGUR

== Sources ==
- Brailsford, Martyn, ed. (December 2017) [1987]. Railway Track Diagrams 1: Scotland & Isle of Man (6th ed.). Frome: Trackmaps. ISBN 978-0-9549866-9-8.
- Butt, R. V. J. (October 1995). The Directory of Railway Stations: details every public and private passenger station, halt, platform and stopping place, past and present (1st ed.). Sparkford: Patrick Stephens Ltd. ISBN 978-1-85260-508-7. OCLC 60251199. OL 11956311M.
- Historic Environment Scotland. "Atlas Road, Springburn Railway Station including Boundary Wall (Category B Listed Building LB49898)".
- Jowett, Alan (March 1989). Jowett's Railway Atlas of Great Britain and Ireland: From Pre-Grouping to the Present Day (1st ed.). Sparkford: Patrick Stephens Ltd. ISBN 978-1-85260-086-0. OCLC 22311137.
