= Coatbridge Branch (NBR) =

UK railway line

Overview
- Status: operational
- Locale: Scotland

Service
- Operator(s): ScotRail

History
- Opened: 1871; 155 years ago

Technical
- Track gauge: 4 ft 8 1/2 in (1,435 mm) standard gauge
Route map
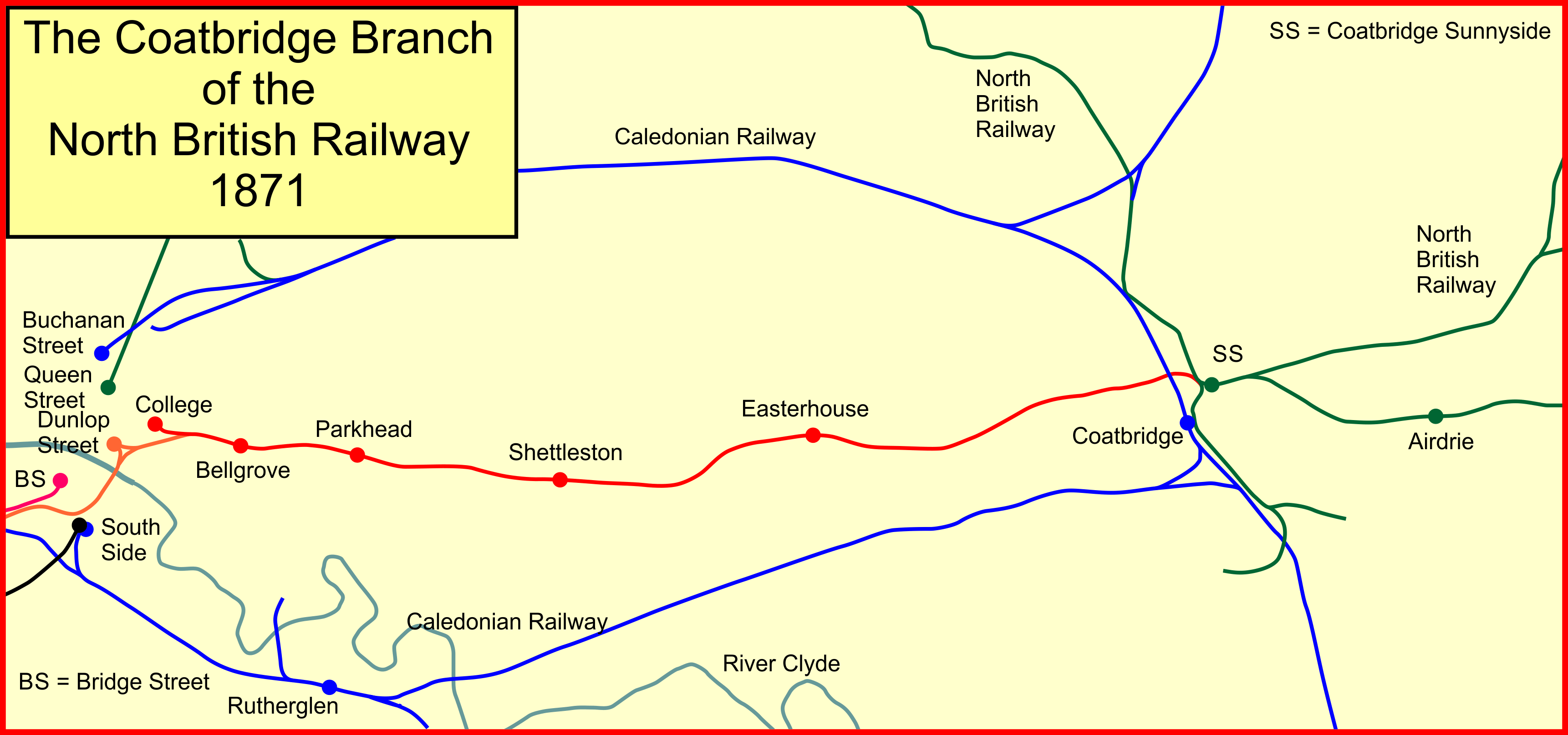

The Coatbridge Branch of the North British Railway was a railway built to connect the important coal and iron industrial districts of Coatbridge and Airdrie directly to Glasgow for the North British Railway.

It opened in 1871 connecting an existing network in the Monklands to a College station (later High Street) in Glasgow. This enabled mineral traffic to reach quays on the River Clyde, and passenger traffic was given a considerable boost when the Glasgow City and District Railway opened in 1886, connecting the Coatbridge line with the North Clyde network west of Glasgow.

The line is open today, handling a considerable suburban passenger traffic and through trains to Edinburgh on the Bathgate route.

== History ==
=== The coal railways ===
In the first decades of the nineteenth century there was increased demand for coal in Glasgow, for domestic and industrial purposes. There were limited local supplies, and the Monkland Canal had been bringing coal in from the Monklands pits. In 1826 the Monkland and Kirkintilloch Railway was opened to modernise the transport of the mineral, bringing it to the Forth and Clyde Canal. The line was horse-operated with primitive permanent way, but it was successful in its objectives. Other so-called coal railways followed in the district: the Garnkirk and Glasgow Railway being the first line to reach Glasgow from the Monklands, opening in 1831. It was followed by the Wishaw and Coltness Railway, opening from 1833.

The discovery of substantial reserves of blackband iron ore and the development of the hot blast method of iron smelting revolutionised the iron industry and its centre was in Coatbridge, vastly enhancing the fortunes of the local railways.

=== Trunk routes ===
The Edinburgh and Glasgow Railway (E&GR) opened its main line in 1842, intersecting the Monkland and Kirkintilloch Railway. In 1845 there was a frenzy of railway promotion in Scotland, and the Caledonian Railway was authorised, to build a line between Edinburgh, Glasgow and Carlisle. To save the cost of building a new route into Glasgow, the Caledonian arranged to take over the Garnkirk and Glasgow Railway and the Wishaw and Coltness Railway, running its main line over them. This gave the Caledonian Railway a roundabout route from Coatbridge to Glasgow, opened in 1848. The Monkland and Kirkintilloch Railway did not join the Caledonian Railway group, and instead aligned with other coal railways (the Ballochney Railway and the Slamannan Railway) to form the Monkland Railways in 1848. For the time being the Monkland Railways had no direct connection to Glasgow, although there was a connection with the E&GR at Kirkintilloch Junction (later Lenzie). Although it developed numerous branches and new lines, these mostly had an eastwards emphasis. The Monkland Railways were absorbed by the Edinburgh and Glasgow Railway on 31 July 1865.

=== The North British Railway ===
In 1846 the North British Railway (NBR) opened its first line, between Edinburgh and Berwick-upon-Tweed. It saw itself as a trunk line, joining with English railways to form a through route to London. Subsequent acquisitions and openings emphasised the easterly orientation, until on 1 August 1865 the NBR amalgamated with the Edinburgh and Glasgow Railway, so that it now had a Glasgow terminal, at Queen Street. The Monkland Railways had been absorbed by the E&GR the previous day, so now the NBR had a presence at Coatbridge as well. The amalgamations gave the NBR excellent connectivity eastwards from Coatbridge, but the awkward route towards Glasgow remained; this was important because much iron ore and finished iron was exported from quays in Glasgow, and from Ayrshire ports. Moreover, the best of the Monklands coal and iron deposits had been worked out; the emphasis on the mineral extraction was shifting to south Lanarkshire, in Caledonian Railway territory.

=== Coatbridge to Glasgow ===
Edinburgh and Glasgow Railway (Coatbridge Branch) Act 1865
- Act of Parliament
- Parliament of the United Kingdom
- Long title: An Act to authorize the Edinburgh and Glasgow Railway Company to make a Railway from Glasgow to Coatbridge, and a Junction with the City of Glasgow Union Railway; and for other Purposes.
- Citation: 28 & 29 Vict. c. cccxxviii

Dates
- Royal assent: 5 July 1865

The NBR set about closing the gap by building a line running directly west from Sunnyside Junction, Coatbridge to Glasgow. The route became practicable because of the promotion of the City of Glasgow Union Railway (CoGUR). This was being done by the NBR jointly with the Glasgow and South Western Railway (G&SWR), and the CoGUR was constructing a line crossing the River Clyde in Glasgow. In the early days there were ideas of through express passenger services between the North British Railway (former E&GR line) and the G&SWR routes, although this concept was not much developed, and the majority of the CoGUR was absorbed by the G&SWR. However, there was to be a large modern goods depot at College (later High Street). Hitherto the NBR had been much criticised for its poor goods facilities in the city; and through mineral train workings to the General Terminus and Glasgow Harbour Railway and the Ayrshire ports were to be enabled. The CoGUR line opened in 1871 as far as Bellgrove; the onward section to Sighthill took several more years.

The NBR Coatbridge to Glasgow line therefore was planned to run to College in Glasgow. It was opened from Coatbridge to Bellgrove on 23 November 1870, and passenger trains were extended to Gallowgate on the C0GUR from 1 December 1870. On 1 February 1871 the line was finally extended to College. The NBR was at last able to discontinue running passenger trains from the Monklands to Buchanan Street station over the rival Caledonian Railway.

The NBR already had a line from Edinburgh via Bathgate to Coatbridge, partly inherited from the Monkland Railways, and this completed an Edinburgh to Glasgow route slightly shorter than the former E&GR main line; however curvature and gradients condemned the Bathgate and Coatbridge route to secondary status.

From 1 September 1872 through passenger trains from Ayr to Edinburgh via Bellgrove, Coatbridge and Bathgate were inaugurated. Several mineral lines radiated from the Coatbridge line to coal pits close to the line.

=== A branch to Hamilton ===
The migration of the centre of iron and coal extraction from the Monklands towards Hamilton and Bothwell put the activity in Caledonian Railway territory. The NBR wanted to access the area, and encouraged a nominally independent railway, the Glasgow, Bothwell, Hamilton and Coatbridge Railway to build a branch. It opened in 1877 (for passengers in 1878), diverging from the Coatbridge line at Shettleston.

=== A line through Glasgow ===
The College station in Glasgow was on High Street, and this was not close to the commercial and residential districts of the city. Moreover, the NBR had routes west of the city, to Dumbarton and Helensburgh, and these too were badly connected into the NBR network. The NBR decided to undertake the construction of a sub-surface line running east to west through the city. This became the Glasgow City and District Railway (GC&DR), and it was opened on 15 March 1886. It ran from a location a little east of College, dropping into a new College station at a lower level, and then running through tunnel to Queen Street Low Level station and on to Stobcross, where it connected into the NBR network on the north bank of the River Clyde. The line was opened for passenger trains only, to minimise smoke nuisance at the stations. The opening enabled through running across the city, a move that was immensely popular with passengers.

The original College terminus was closed to passengers and the site was developed to further expand the College goods station.

=== Bridgeton ===
The residential district of Bridgeton was of considerable importance at the time, and the NBR built a short branch to it from College; it diverged from the GC&DR line towards the north of the Coatbridge line and descended to pass southwards under the main line. It opened on 1 June 1892. The Glasgow and South Western Railway wished to access the Bridgeton terminus too, and built a connecting curve from the City of Glasgow Union Railway route to join the Bridgeton branch; it opened on 1 April 1893, but it was not popular, and the service was suspended on 1 February 1913, after which the tunnel section was sealed.

=== From 1923 ===
The main line railways of Great Britain were compulsorily "grouped" by the Railways Act 1921, effective in 1923. The North British Railway was a constituent of the new London and North Eastern Railway (LNER). The railways were further re-organised after World War II by nationalisation in 1948: the line became a part of the Scottish Region of British Railways.

By this time the coal and iron industries had undergone great change and decline, and the railway itself was unpopular in the face of alternative transport methods. It was decided in 1955 to modernise selected routes and the line was included in the plan: most of the former NBR network from Helensburgh to Airdrie was to be electrified. This was activated in 1960, although early technical difficulties with train-borne equipment resulted in temporary suspension. Nonetheless the new passenger train service was a considerable success.

By this time the through passenger service to Edinburgh via Bathgate had been terminated (in 1956) but some through freight continued to run east of Airdrie, though this too was closed down in the 1970s. In 2010 the Airdrie to Bathgate section was reopened as an electrified passenger route.

== The line today ==
The Coatbridge branch is in use today from High Street (the renamed College through station) to Sunnyside Junction, carrying a heavy and well used passenger suburban service, with through semi-fast trains to Edinburgh, operated by ScotRail, part of the North Clyde Line.

== Topography ==
- College; original terminus; opened 1 April 1871; replaced by through station on GC&DR line 15 March 1886;
- High Street Junction; convergence of (later) Glasgow City and District Railway, and of City of Glasgow Union Railway;
- Bellgrove; divergence of line to Springburn; opened 23 November 1870;
- Parkhead; opened 23 November 1870; renamed Parkhead North 1952; closed 19 September 1958;
- Parkhead Junction; convergence of line from Springburn;
- Carntyne; opened June 1888; closed 1 January 1917; reopened 1 April 1919;
- Shettleston; divergence of Hamilton line; opened 23 November 1870;
- Garrowhill; opened 16 March 1936 (originally as Garrowhill Halt);
- Easterhouse; opened 23 November 1870;
- Cuilhill; opened February 1871; renamed Bargeddie 1904; closed 1 January 1917; reopened 1 February 1919; closed 24 September 1927; a Bargeddie station was opened on the Rutherglen and Coatbridge line in 1993;
- Drumpellier and Gartsherrie; opened December 1888; renamed Blairhill and Gartsherrie by 1910; renamed Blairhill after 1969;
- Sunnyside Junction; convergence with Monkland and Kirkintilloch line, and onwards route to Airdrie and Edinburgh.
