= ZoneCard =

Travel card for the Strathclyde region

ZoneCard is a travel card issued by Strathclyde Partnership for Transport in Scotland.

== Usage ==
The scheme divides the Strathclyde Partnership for Transport(SPT) area into 7 regions distinguished by a number of 1-7.

A Zonecard is any Itso compatible smartcard, though SPT do offer specific Zonecard smartcards.

Zonecard can be used as a smartcard similar to London's Oyster card and Sydney's Opal card to tap in and out of ticket barriers at subway and National rail stations as well as on buses and ferries throughout the SPT region depending on the zones Purchased.

Zonecards as of December 2024 can be purchased online here and if you already have a compatible smartcard in any Payzone outlet within the Strathclyde region.

ZoneCard's can be used with any participating transport provider within the zones that the holder has purchased. With a plethora of transport providers—across bus, rail, and ferry services—in the scheme, there are very few companies who do not accept ZoneCards. However the only TOC that accepts Zonecard is ScotRail.

Fares and further information can be found online using the reference here.

== Revenue ==
The revenue from the scheme is split between the participating operators (the administration costs are absorbed by SPT) based on a number of factors, such as the number of routes operated by a provider, an annual user survey, and passenger counts by SPT officials. Some operators (notably ScotRail) are guaranteed a certain percentage of the revenue regardless of these factors. Aside from the previously mentioned administration costs, the scheme is designed to be self-supporting, unlike some other tickets which are subsidised with public money to help the significant percentage of households in the region that do not have access to a car.

== Legacy Zonecard ==
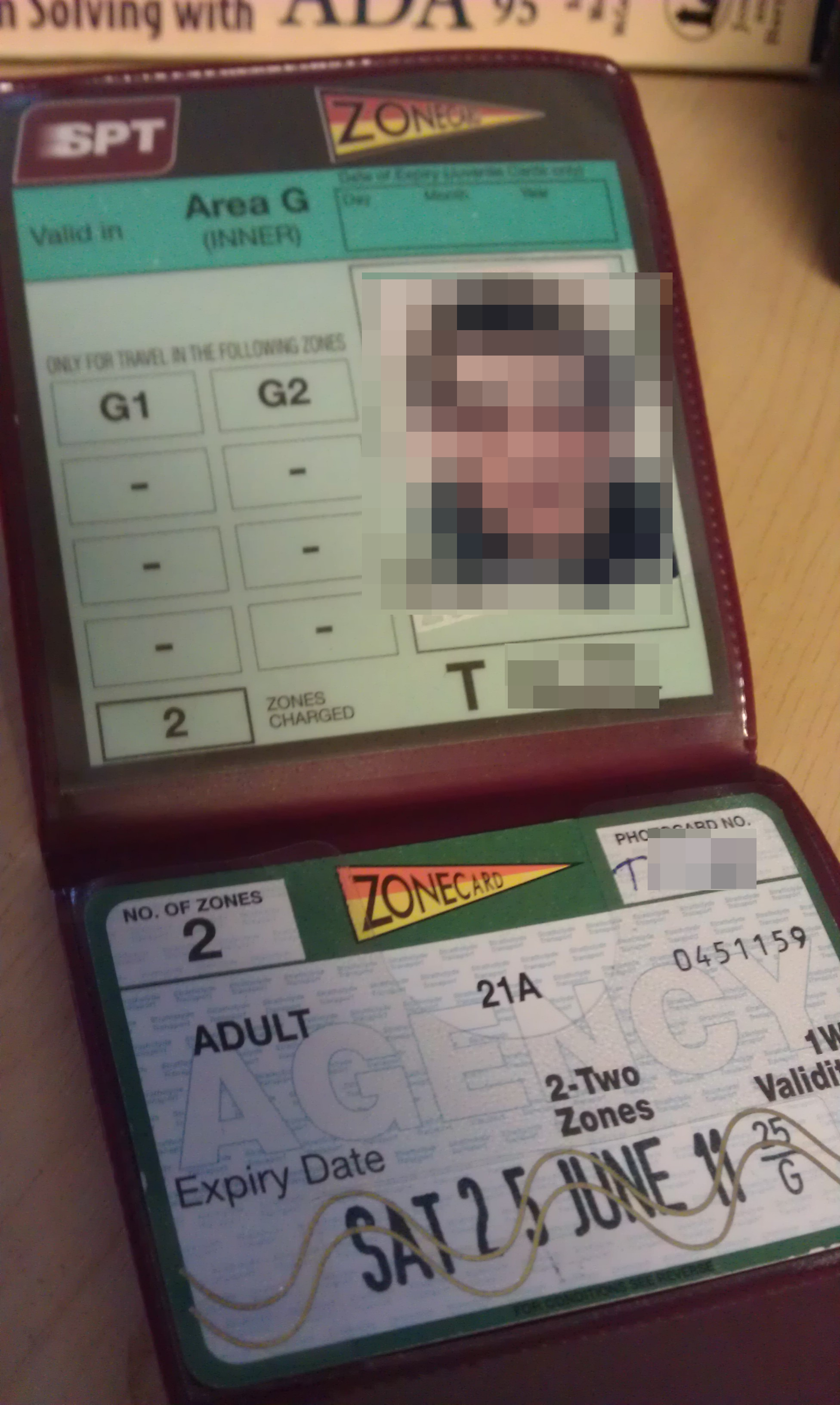
An opened wallet showing both parts of a Legacy SPT ZoneCard

Paper ZoneCards are no longer on sale but can still be used until their printed expiry date

The legacy Zonecard had been issued by a number of entities including todays SPT, organisations which have previously issued Zonecard include: Strathclyde Partnership for Transport, Strathclyde Passenger Transport and Strathclyde Transport under Strathclyde Regional Council.

Prior to the modernisation of the scheme the SPT area was split into 9 regions distinguished by a letter:

D for Dumbarton
S for Strathkelvin
G for Glasgow
Y for Inverclyde (In case there is confusion between the letter 'I' and the number '1')
R for Renfrew
K for Kilmarnock
A for Ayr
H for Hamilton
L for Lanark

These are further subdivided into zones dividing the main towns of the area for example Ayr, Prestwick and Troon are in A1, A2 and A3 respectively; there are 77 zones in total. A traveller with a ticket for either G1 or G2 is also able to travel within the shaded city centre area, but travel into an outer Glasgow zone (G3 to G8) requiems a minimum of three zones. Tickets with three Glasgow zones are valid for travel in all Glasgow zones (G1 to G8). The city centre is served by both inner Glasgow zones, and purchasing one of these entitles the user to use the subway system in both areas.

A child's zonecard with 6 zones or an adult zonecard with 13 zones, entitles the user to travel throughout all zones.

A Legacy ZoneCard consists of a photocard and a paper counterpart which displays the validity period and is used for operating the barriers on Glasgow's Subway. Previously, passengers who have validated their tickets for the Subway needed to have their tickets manually checked at the ticket barriers at Glasgow Queen Street station because the barriers accept only standard-sized Subway tickets. In 2004, Glasgow Queen Street's ticket barriers were updated so that ZoneCards did not need validation to operate them. The card can be purchased in durations of 1 week, 4 weeks, 10 weeks, and 1 year.

ZoneCard can be used with any participating transport provider within the zones that the holder has purchased. With a vast amount of transport providers—across bus, Rail, and Ferry services—in the scheme, there are very few companies who do not accept ZoneCards. The only Train operating company(TOC) which currently accepts ZoneCards is ScotRail, however there have previously been other TOC's involved in the scheme.

Operators criticise the complexity of the zone system, which consists of 77 zones. By comparison, Transport for London's scheme consists of 9 zones despite containing 90 more underground stations than the SPT does rail stations. However, the TfL system only covers 614 square miles (1,600 km^{2}), an area slightly smaller than South Lanarkshire. In addition, the SPT bus network is far larger due to the greater size of its zone system.
