= Milton of Campsie railway station =

Disused railway station in Milton of Campsie, East Dunbartonshire

Milton of Campsie

General information
- Location: Milton of Campsie, Stirlingshire; Scotland
- Coordinates: 55.9621°N 4.1617°W
- Grid reference: NS651764
- Platforms: 2

Other information
- Status: Disused

History
- Original company: Edinburgh and Glasgow Railway
- Pre-grouping: North British Railway
- Post-grouping: London and North Eastern Railway

Key dates
- 5 July 1848: Opened as Miltown
- 1874: Name changed to Milton
- 1 May 1912: Name changed to Milton of Campsie
- 1 October 1951: Closed
Location

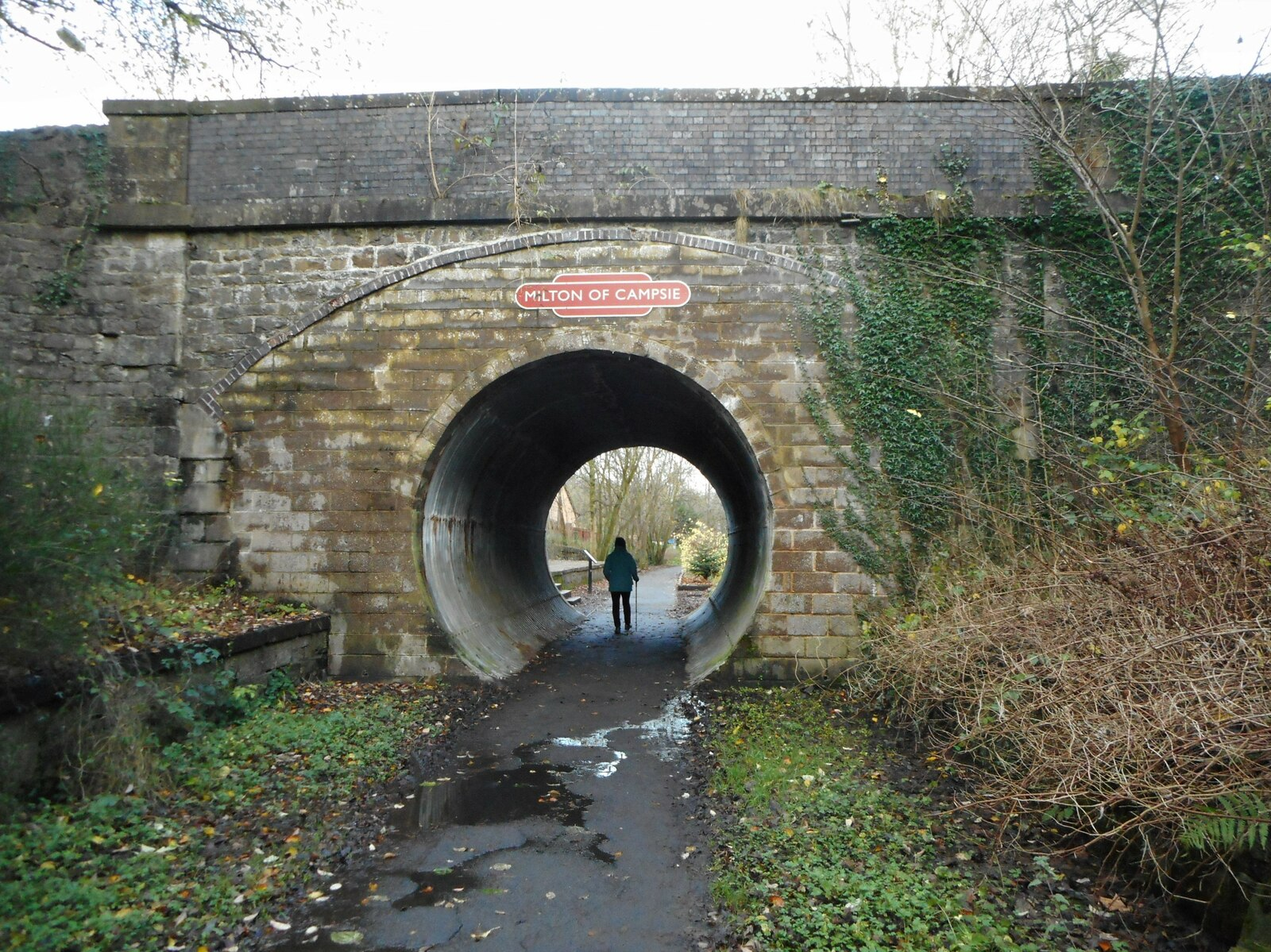

Milton of Campsie railway station served the village of Milton of Campsie, in the historical county of Stirlingshire, Scotland, from 1848 to 1951 on the Campsie Branch.

== History ==
The station was opened as Miltown on 5 July 1848 by the Edinburgh and Glasgow Railway. To the east was a siding that served a loading bank, near this was the signal box and on the eastbound platform was the station building. To the west was a siding that served Lillyburn Printworks and to the south was a siding that served Kincaid Printworks. The station's name was changed to Milton in 1874 and changed again to Milton in Campsie on 1 May 1912. It closed to passengers on 1 October 1951. Goods traffic through the station continued until April 1966, after which the entire line was closed and the rails lifted.

Following the closure of the line, the station became derelict, "a squalid and overgrown rubbish tip". But in 2014, a local resident, Greg Summers, launched an initiative to clean up the site and to turn it into an asset for the community. Over the next few years, volunteers, community groups and local businesses worked to clear the litter, remove the graffiti, renovate the platforms and the station bridge, and install flower beds, murals, benches and information boards. Today, the former station is considered an important part of the life of the village.

Preceding station	Disused railways	Following station
Lennoxtown (New); Line and station closed	North British Railway; Campsie Branch	Kirkintilloch; Line and station closed
