= Blanefield railway station =

Disused railway station in Blanefield, Stirlingshire

Blanefield
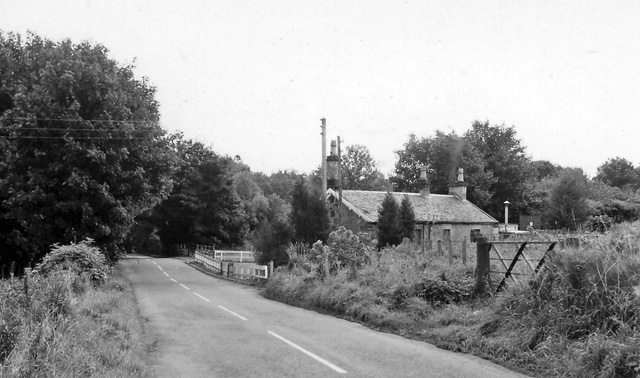
- The site of the station in 1974

General information
- Location: Blanefield, Stirling; Scotland
- Coordinates: 55.9878°N 4.3265°W
- Grid reference: NS549796
- Platforms: 1

Other information
- Status: Disused

History
- Original company: North British Railway
- Post-grouping: LNER; British Railways (Scottish Region)

Key dates
- 1 July 1867: Opened
- 1 October 1951: Closed to passengers
- 5 October 1959: Closed to goods
Location

Blanefield railway station served the village of Blanefield, Stirling, Scotland from 1867 to 1959 on the Blane Valley Railway.

== History ==
The station opened on 1 July 1867 by the North British Railway. The signal box, which opened in 1894, was to the west next to the level crossing. The station closed to passengers on 1 October 1951. Goods traffic continued until 5 October 1959.

Preceding station	Disused railways	Following station
Dumgoyne; Line and station closed	North British Railway; Blane Valley Railway	Strathblane; Line and station closed
