= Strathblane railway station =

Disused railway station in Strathblane, Stirling

Strathblane

General information
- Location: Strathblane, Stirling; Scotland
- Coordinates: 55.9846°N 4.3038°W
- Grid reference: NS563792
- Platforms: 1

Other information
- Status: Disused

History
- Original company: North British Railway
- Post-grouping: LNER; British Railways (Scottish Region)

Key dates
- 1 July 1867: Opened
- 1 October 1951: Closed
Location

Strathblane railway station served the village of Strathblane, Stirling, Scotland from 1867 to 1951 on the Blane Valley Railway.

== History ==
The station opened on 1 July 1867 by the North British Railway. There was a siding on the north side with a dock. The station closed to passengers on 1 October 1951.

Preceding station	Disused railways	Following station
Blanefield; Line and station closed	North British Railway; Blane Valley Railway	Campsie Glen; Line and station closed
