= Lennoxtown (Old) railway station =

Disused railway station in Dunbartonshire, Scotland

Coordinates: 55.9737°N 4.2019°W

Lennoxtown (Old)

General information
- Location: Lennoxtown, Dunbartonshire; Scotland
- Platforms: 1

Other information
- Status: Disused

History
- Original company: North British Railway

Key dates
- 5 July 1848: Opened as Lennoxtown
- 1 July 1867: Name changed to Lennoxtown (Old)
- 1 October 1881: Closed

Lennoxtown railway station served the town of Lennoxtown, Dunbartonshire, Scotland from 1848 to 1881 on the Blane Valley Railway.

== History ==
The station opened as Lennoxtown on 5 July 1848 as Lennoxtown by the North British Railway. It had a trainshed on the east side and a goods yard which was on both sides of the approaching line. The station's name was changed to Lennoxtown (Old) on 1 July 1867 when Lennoxtown (New) opened in the same year. This station remained open until 1 October 1881.
