= Campsie Glen railway station =

Disused railway station in Clachan of Campsie, East Dunbartonshire

Campsie Glen
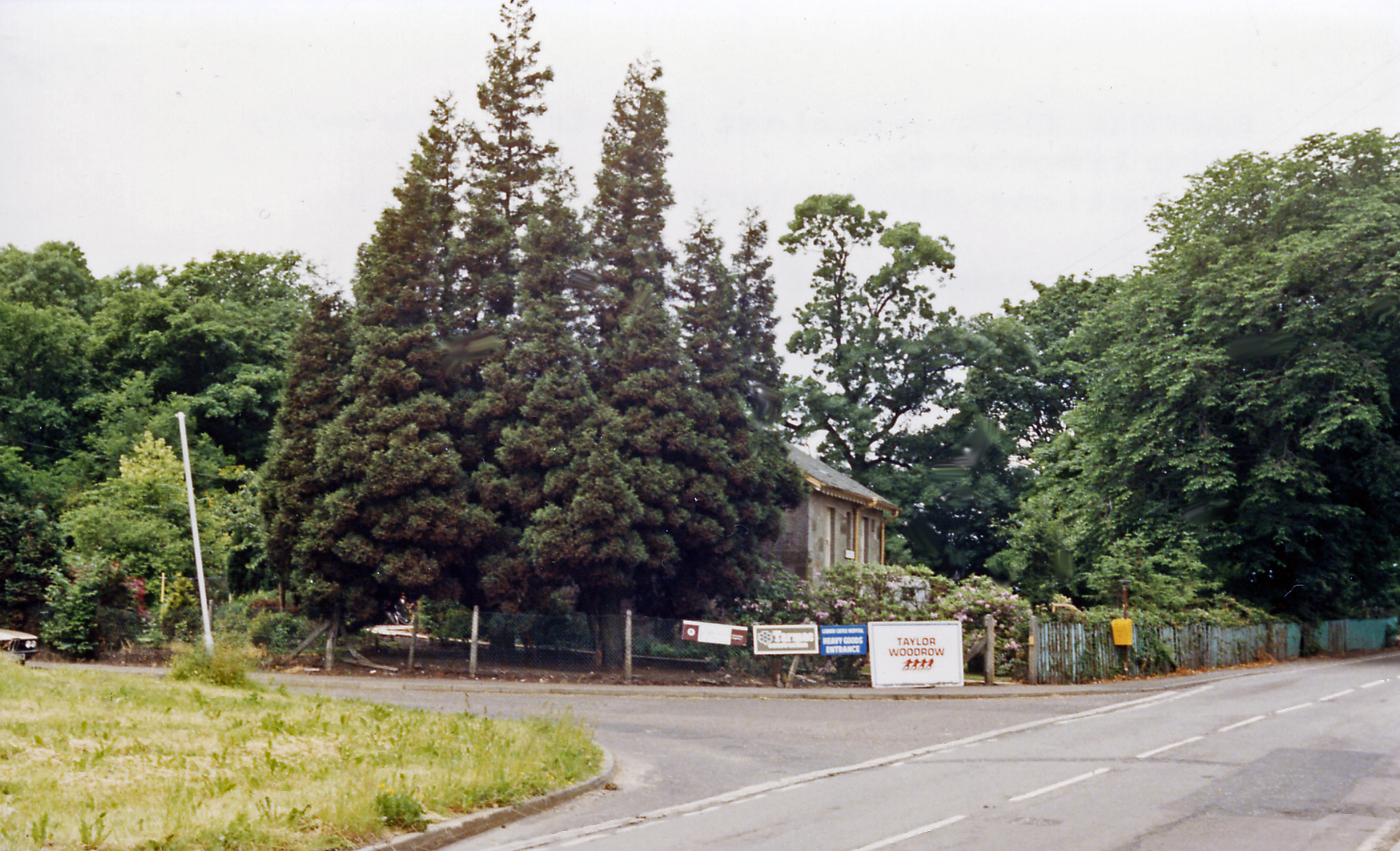
- The site of the station in 1986

General information
- Location: Clachan of Campsie, East Dunbartonshire; Scotland
- Coordinates: 55.9808°N 4.2211°W
- Grid reference: NS615786
- Platforms: 1

Other information
- Status: Disused

History
- Original company: North British Railway
- Post-grouping: LNER; British Railways (Scottish Region)

Key dates
- 1 July 1867: Opened
- 1 January 1917: Closed
- 1 February 1919: Reopened
- 1 October 1951: Closed
Location

Campsie Glen railway station served the village of Clachan of Campsie, East Dunbartonshire, Scotland from 1867 to 1951 on the Blane Valley Railway; the village was in Stirlingshire during the period of operation of the station.

== History ==
The station opened on 1 July 1867 by the North British Railway. At the east end was a siding. The station closed on 1 January 1917 but reopened on 1 February 1919, before closing permanently on 1 October 1951.

Preceding station	Disused railways	Following station
Strathblane; Line and station closed	North British Railway; Blane Valley Railway	Lennoxtown (New); Line and station closed
