= Kirkintilloch railway station =

Former railway station in Scotland

Kirkintilloch

General information
- Location: Kirkintilloch; Scotland
- Coordinates: 55.941°N 4.153°W
- Platforms: 2

Other information
- Status: Disused

History
- Original company: Edinburgh and Glasgow Railway
- Pre-grouping: North British Railway
- Post-grouping: London and North Eastern Railway

Key dates
- 5 July 1848: Station opens.
- 7 September 1964: Station closes.
Location

Kirkintilloch railway station served part of Kirkintilloch in Scotland. The station was constructed by the Edinburgh and Glasgow Railway, which became part of the North British Railway.

== History ==
Opened by the Edinburgh and Glasgow Railway in 1848, the station passed to the North British Railway in 1858, the London and North Eastern Railway in the 1923 Grouping, and then to the Scottish Region of British Railways on nationalisation in 1948. It was then closed by the British Railways Board in September 1964.

At present, the nearest operational station to Kirkintilloch is Lenzie railway station

Preceding station	Disused railways	Following station
Back O'Loch Halt; From 1925 to line closure	Campsie Branch; North British Railway	Milton of Campsie; Station closed, Line closed
Lenzie; Station open, Line closed	Campsie Branch; North British Railway	Milton of Campsie; Station closed, Line closed
Lenzie; Station open, Line closed	Kelvin Valley Railway; North British Railway	Twechar; Station closed, Line closed
