= Lennoxtown (New) railway station =

Disused railway station in Dunbartonshire, Scotland

Lennoxtown (New)

General information
- Location: Lennoxtown, Dunbartonshire; Scotland
- Coordinates: 55.9725°N 4.2034°W
- Grid reference: NS625776
- Platforms: 1

Other information
- Status: Disused

History
- Original company: North British Railway
- Post-grouping: LNER; British Railways (Scottish Region)

Key dates
- 1 July 1867: Opened as Lennoxtown Blane Valley
- 1 October 1881: Name changed to Lennoxtown
- 1 October 1951: Closed

Lennoxtown railway station served the town of Lennoxtown, Dunbartonshire, Scotland from 1867 to 1951 on the Blane Valley Railway.

== History ==
The station opened as Lennoxtown Blane Valley on 1 July 1867 as Lennoxtown by the North British Railway. A second platform was going to be added but a loop was laid instead; this was later lifted. There were no goods facilities here as they were at the old station. The station's name was changed to Lennoxtown on 1 October 1881. It closed on 1 October 1951.

| Preceding station | Disused railways | Following station |
|---|---|---|
| Campsie Glen; Line and station closed | North British Railway; Blane Valley Railway | Lennoxtown (Old); Line and station closed |
