= LNZ =

LNZ may refer to:

- LNZ, the IATA code for Linz Airport, a minor international airport in Hörsching, Austria
- LNZ, the National Rail code for Lenzie railway station, East Dunbartonshire, Scotland
- LNZ, a Ukrainian professional football club FC LNZ Cherkasy based in Cherkasy
