= Back O'Loch Halt railway station =

Disused railway station in Kirkintilloch, Scotland

Back O'Loch Halt

General information
- Location: Kirkintilloch; Scotland
- Coordinates: 55.934°N 4.151°W
- Platforms: 2

Other information
- Status: Disused

History
- Post-grouping: London and North Eastern Railway

Key dates
- 1925: Station opens
- 7 September 1964: Station closes
Location

Back O'Loch Halt railway station on the Edinburgh and Glasgow Railway built Campsie Branch served part of Kirkintilloch in Scotland.

== History ==
Opened by the London and North Eastern Railway to counter growing road competition, the timber built station passed to the Scottish Region of British Railways on nationalisation in 1948, and was then closed by the British Railways Board on 7 September 1964.

Preceding station	Historical railways	Following station
Lenzie	London and North Eastern Railway; Campsie Branch	Kirkintilloch

== The site today ==
The station site was still visible but all traces have been removed as a result of the construction of the Kirkintilloch link road which opened in late 2010. At this section the link road follows the route of the Campsie Branch and utilises much of the original cuttings and embankments.
