= Lenzie railway station =

Railway station in East Dunbartonshire, Scotland

Lenzie Scottish Gaelic: Lèanaidh
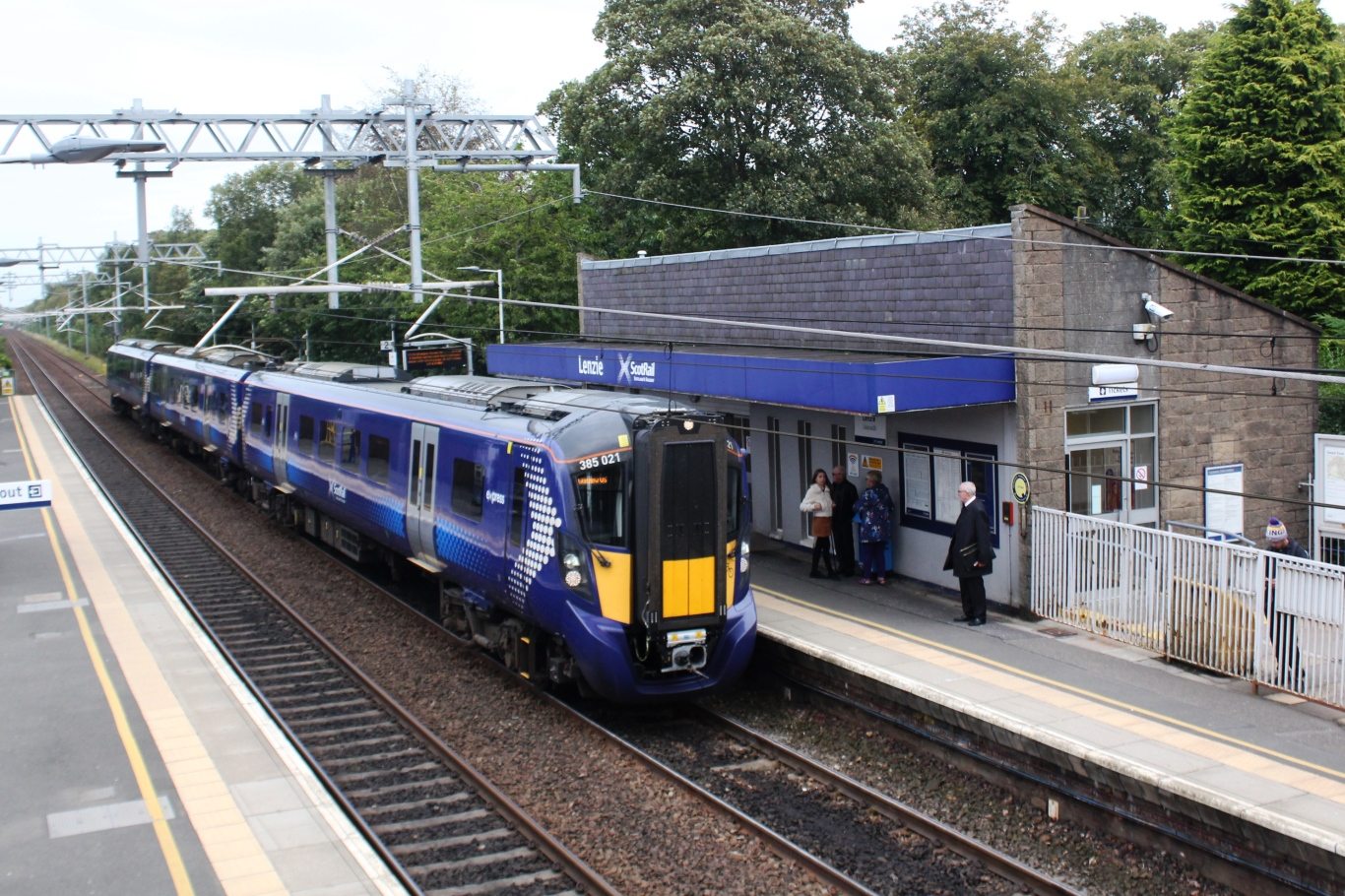
- A Class 385 going to Glasgow Queen Street

General information
- Location: Lenzie, East Dunbartonshire; Scotland
- Coordinates: 55.9213°N 4.1542°W
- Grid reference: NS655719
- Managed by: ScotRail
- Transit authority: SPT
- Platforms: 2

Other information
- Station code: LNZ

History
- Original company: Edinburgh and Glasgow Railway
- Pre-grouping: North British Railway
- Post-grouping: London and North Eastern Railway

Key dates
- 5 July 1848: Opened as Kirkintilloch Junction
- December 1849: Renamed Campsie Junction
- November 1867: Renamed Lenzie Junction
- June 1890: Renamed Lenzie

Passengers
- 2020/21: ▼0.136 million
- 2021/22: ▲0.422 million
- 2022/23: ▲0.563 million
- 2023/24: ▲0.707 million
- 2024/25: ▲0.720 million
Location
Notes
- Passenger statistics from the Office of Rail and Road

Lenzie railway station is a railway station serving Lenzie and Kirkintilloch in East Dunbartonshire, Scotland. It is located on the Croy Line, 6 1/4 miles (10.1 km) northeast of Glasgow Queen Street. Trains on the Glasgow to Edinburgh via Falkirk Line pass Lenzie by. The station is served by ScotRail.

== History ==
The station was opened as Kirkintilloch Junction on 5 July 1848 by the Edinburgh and Glasgow Railway, being renamed three times by the North British Railway, to Campsie Junction in December 1849, Lenzie Junction in November 1867 and finally Lenzie in June 1890.

To the east of the station was a complex of junctions which allowed eastbound trains to travel to Kirkintilloch via the Campsie Branch of the Edinburgh and Glasgow Railway, and to Garnqueen South Junction and Gartsherrie North Junction (both with the Caledonian Railway Main Line) to Coatbridge Sunnyside via the Monkland and Kirkintilloch Railway.

== Services ==
Monday to Saturdays, there is a half-hourly service southbound to Glasgow and northbound to Dunblane or Alloa (hourly to each).

In addition to the off peak services, there are a few morning services to Edinburgh via Falkirk High and a limited evening service to Falkirk Grahamston. The latter was formerly served from here throughout the day, but the Glasgow to Falkirk Grahamston service was re-routed to run via Cumbernauld in the mid 1990s to free up paths on the main line. Also, there is a once a day (Monday - Friday) service from Glasgow - Markinch in the evening.

On Sundays, there is an hourly service in each direction to Glasgow and Alloa with the first eastbound service of the day going to Aberdeen via Stirling, Perth, Dundee and Arbroath.

Preceding station	National Rail	Following station
Croy	ScotRail; Croy Line	Bishopbriggs
	Historical railways	
Croy; Line and station open	North British Railway; Edinburgh and Glasgow Railway	Bishopbriggs; Line and station open
Back o' Loch Halt; Line and station closed	North British Railway; Campsie Branch	Bishopbriggs; Line and station open
