= Strathkelvin Railway Path =

Long-distance cycling route in Scotland

Coordinates: 55.9482°N 4.1524°W

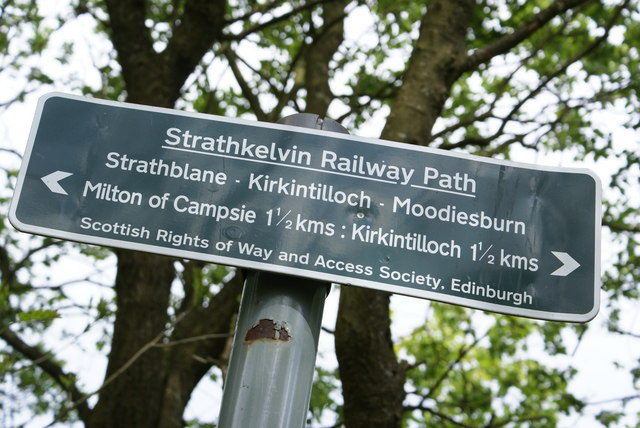
Strathkelvin Railway Path - geograph.org.uk - 437812

Strathkelvin Railway Path is a rail trail following the route of several dismantled railway lines extending from Gartcosh to Strathblane.

== History ==
The northern section (12.4km) follows the route of the Campsie Branch of the Edinburgh and Glasgow Railway, which was extended as the Blane Valley Railway line and closed in the 1950s. The southern section (6.6km) follows a branch of the Monkland and Kirkintilloch Railway, running south from Gallowhill Road in Kirkintilloch and currently terminating at the northern tip of Gartcosh (just before the original railway junction would have split east to Bedlay Colliery and south to Glenboig).

== Future Plans ==
The path is part of the National Cycle Network route 755. It crosses National Cycle Network no. 754 (Forth & Clyde Canal) in Kirkintilloch. In the future it is planned that the path will be extended to the north further to incorporate part of the West Highland Way towards Drymen where it will link to National Cycle Network no. 7. To the south there are plans to continue the path to Drumpellier Country Park and then the Monkland Canal where it will link to National Cycle Network no. 75 in Coatbridge.

== See also ==
- National Cycle Network
- List of rail trails
- List of National Cycle Network routes
