= Blanefield =

Coordinates: 55.986°N 4.306°W

Blanefield: Scottish Gaelic: Strath Bhlàthain
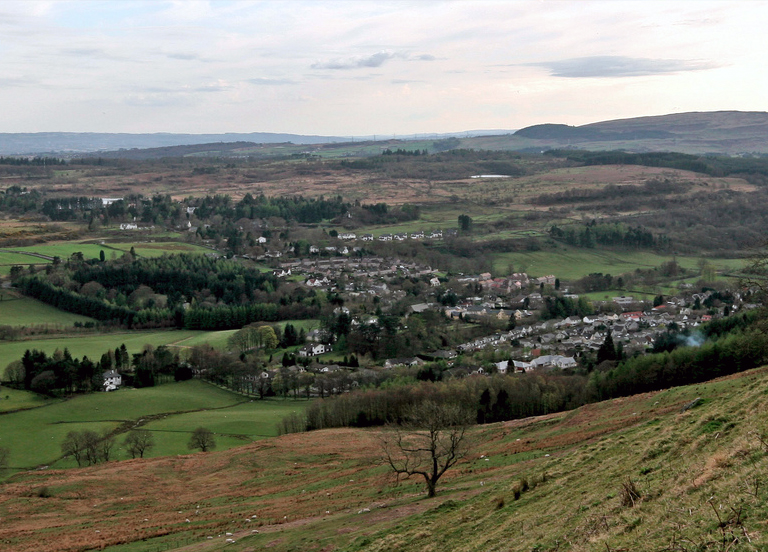
- A view over Blanefield and Strathblane from Ballagan

- Location within the Stirling council area
- Area: 17 sq mi (44 km^{2})
- Population: 1,811 (2001 Census)
  - Density: 54/km^{2} (140/sq mi)
- OS grid reference: NS561794
  - Edinburgh: 46 mi (74 km) E
  - London: 358 mi (576 km) SSE
- Civil parish: Strathblane
- Council area: Stirling
- Lieutenancy area: Stirling and Falkirk
- Country: Scotland
- Sovereign state: United Kingdom
- Post town: GLASGOW
- Postcode district: G63
- Dialling code: 01360
- Police: Scotland
- Fire: Scottish
- Ambulance: Scottish
- UK Parliament: Stirling and Strathallan
- Scottish Parliament: Stirling

Blanefield is a settlement in Scotland contiguous with Strathblane's northwestern fringe. To the west is the volcanic plug Dumgoyne, Glengoyne Distillery and the Trossachs National Park. The West Highland Way—a long-distance trail—passes close to the village.

The Blane Water (Uisge Bhlàthain) has also been referred to as Beul-abhainn (Scottish Gaelic pronunciation: [ˈpial̪ˠa.ɪɲ]) meaning "mouth-river" after the numerous burns merging. One of its tributaries, the Ballagan Burn passes over the waterfall the Spout of Ballagan which shows 192 alternate strata of coloured shales and limestone (including pure alabaster). The Blane flows into the Endrick, which, in its turn, flows westward to Loch Lomond.

== History ==
A rise in population during the early 19th century was due in part to the development of a large calico printfield at Blanefield (employing 78 adults and 45 children under 14) and two bleachfields at Dumbrock (employing 67 adults and 14 children under 14) working 10–11 hours per day, 6 days a week. There is no sign of this industry in the village today which has a rural, picturesque aspect while the majority of parishioners now commute to work in neighbouring towns such as Bearsden, Glasgow, Milngavie, and Stirling.

== Governance ==
Blanefield lies within the registration county and Lieutenancy of Stirlingshire, which was an administrative county until local government reorganisation in 1975. From 1975 to 1996 it was part of the Central region of Scotland. Since 1996, Blanefield has formed part of the Stirling council area.

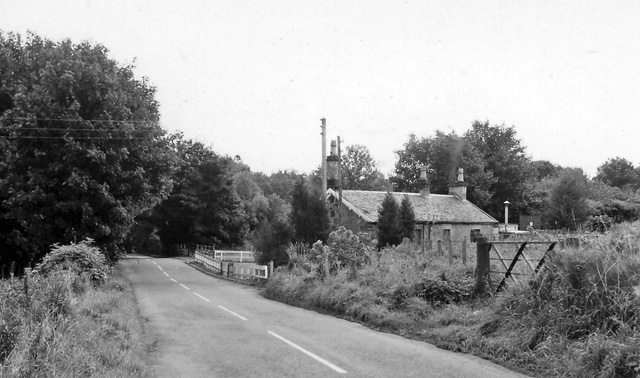
The remains of Blanefield railway station in 1974

For elections to Stirling Council, Blanefield and Strathblane are part of the Forth and Endrick ward. The ward returns three councillors under a system of proportional representation. At the 2017 Scottish local elections, one councillor each from the Conservatives and SNP, and an independent were returned.

Tourism plays a prominent economic role in Blanefield. Tourists visit the area for the walks and the local scenery of the Moorland moors. There are local amenities in Blanefield, including a chemist, deli, pub and hotel, to name a few.

== Education ==
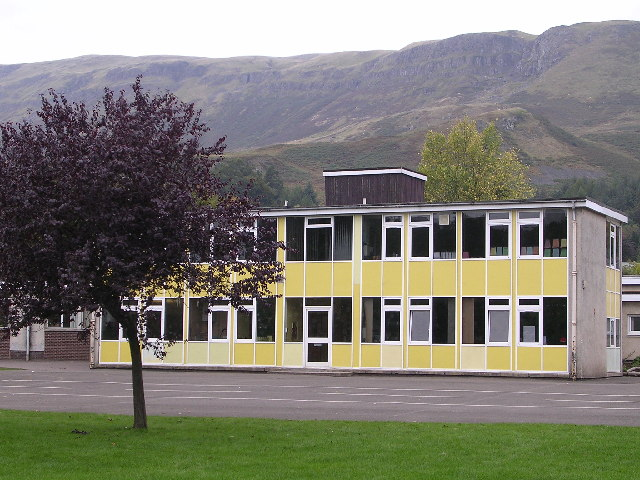
Strathblane Primary School

Strathblane Primary School is the local primary school.

Balfron High School is the local high school.

== Sport ==
Blanefield Thistle F.C. is a local football team. There are clubs and organisations for tennis, bowls, darts, karate and snooker.
