= Glasgow to Aberfoyle Line =

Railway line in East Dunbartonshire, Scotland

The Glasgow to Aberfoyle Line was a railway line in Scotland, built in stages, leaving the Edinburgh and Glasgow Railway near Lenzie. Tourist traffic was a dominant part of the motivation for building the line, and road tours to the Trossachs from Aberfoyle formed a significant part of the traffic.

The first section to open was the Campsie branch of the Edinburgh and Glasgow Railway, to Lennoxtown, in 1848; this became known as the picnic line, and was much used for the purpose by city dwellers. This was followed by the independent Blane Valley Railway in 1866, which reached Killearn. Finally the Strathendrick and Aberfoyle Railway constructed the northernmost section, which opened in 1882.

Running through sparsely populated terrain, the line never made money although the tourist traffic was useful. When road transport became practicable from the 1920s, the decline of the line was inevitable. Cost reduction measures achieved little and in 1951 the passenger service was withdrawn. Some goods traffic continued until 1966. The entire line is now closed.

== History ==
=== The Edinburgh and Glasgow Railway ===
The Edinburgh and Glasgow Railway (E&GR) opened in 1842; it was Scotland's first main line railway. Its passenger business surpassed all expectations, and the railway was profitable. The E&GR made a connection with the Monkland and Kirkintilloch Railway (M&KR) at a station called Kirkintilloch, some distance east of the present-day Lenzie. However the M&KR had a different track gauge, and the connection involved a change of train for passengers and transshipment for goods and minerals.

=== The Campsie branch ===
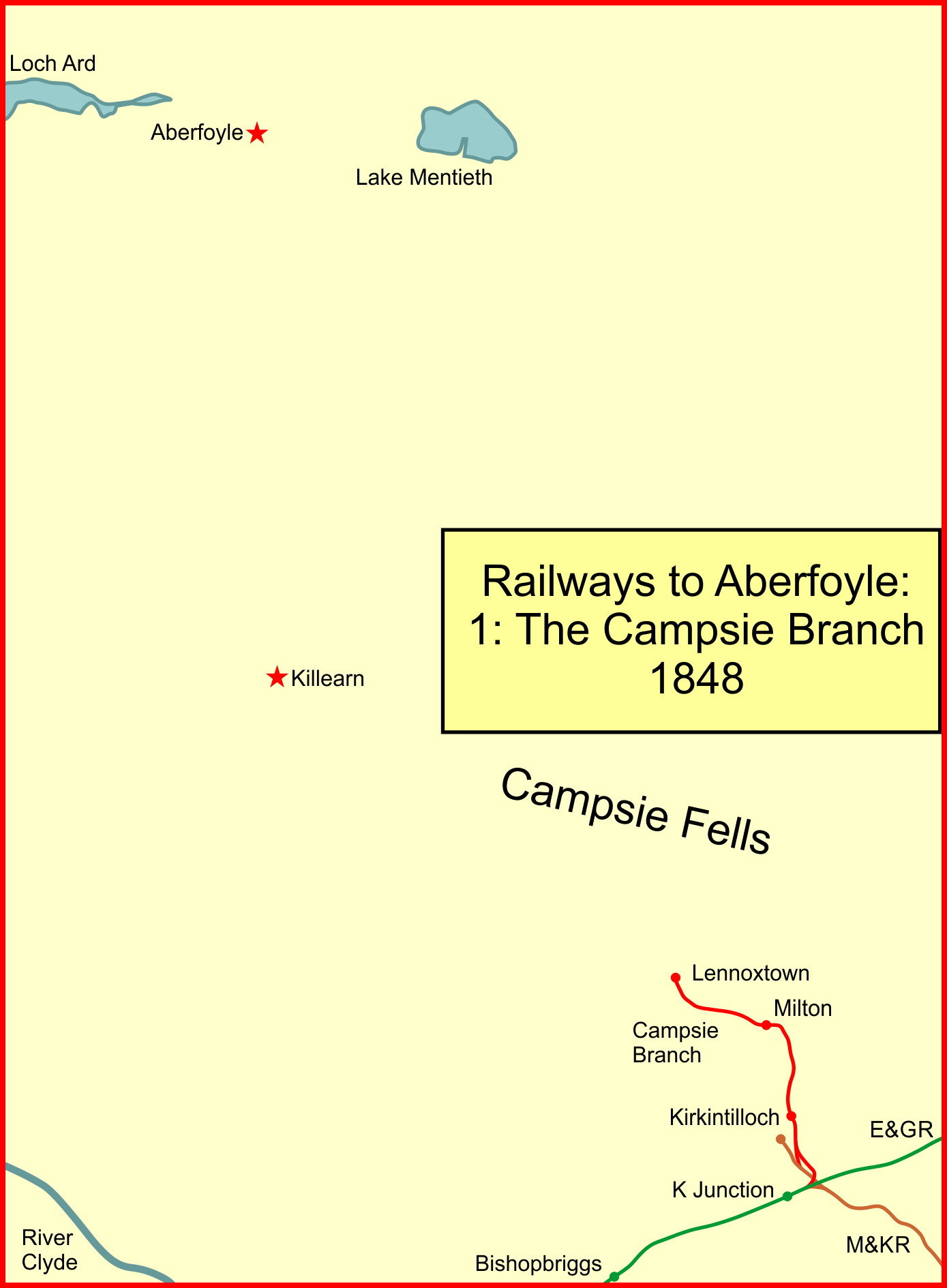
The first section: the Campsie branch of the E&GR

On 5 July 1848 the E&GR opened its Campsie branch. This left the E&GR main line at Lenzie Junction, near the Kirkintilloch station referred to above; the junction was more commonly known later as Campsie Junction. The line ran north from there in the Kelvin Valley, passing through the town of Kirkintilloch and Milton of Campsie to Lennoxtown. The branch ran into and through exceptionally picturesque terrain, and it became popular as the picnic line.

=== The Blane Valley Railway ===
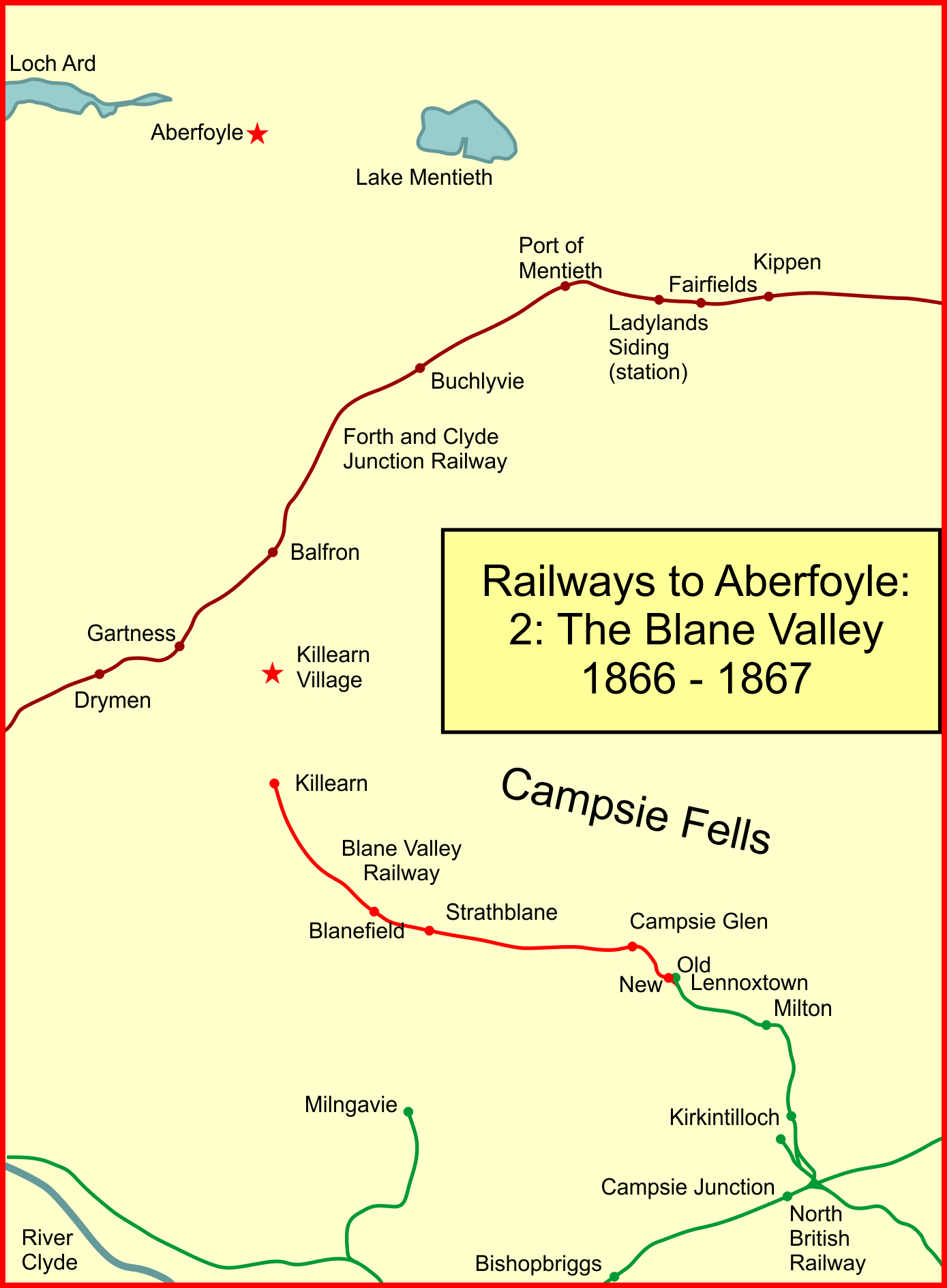
The Blane Valley Railway

Local people promoted the Blane Valley Railway, which extended the Campsie branch as far as Killearn; it was authorised in 1861. They hoped to generate high class residential construction in the attractive area for wealthy Glasgow businesspeople, but the hope was not fulfilled. The Edinburgh and Glasgow Railway subscribed a third of the capital and agreed to work the line. In addition the promoters hoped to reach the Trossachs, then an exceptionally popular tourist destination. However the company ran out of money when the line had been constructed as far as the turnpike road some distance south of Killearn.

The line opened for goods traffic on 5 November 1866, and for passengers on 1 July 1867, to a "Killearn" station some way short of the town. (At this time the Edinburgh and Glasgow Railway had been absorbed by the North British Railway.) The new line was eight and a quarter miles in length. The Lennoxtown terminus of the Campsie branch was unsuitable for the extension, so the Blane Valley line built its own Lennoxtown station, but the earlier terminus remained in use, with trains reversing out to continue their journey. The station was known then as Lennoxtown (Old) and the arrangement lasted until 1 October 1881.

=== Connection from Kilsyth ===
On 3 June 1877 the first section of the Kelvin Valley Railway was opened. The line was planned to run from Maryhill, on the north-western margin of Glasgow, to Kilsyth, but only the short section from a junction with the Campsie branch to Kilsyth was ready. Kilsyth was an important town and there were great celebrations at its linkage to the railway network. Passenger trains from Glasgow ran via Lenzie and Lennoxtown.

It was not until 4 June 1879 that the Kelvin Valley Railway was extended to Maryhill, and even then the connection at Maryhill was not properly formed; this was finally achieved on 1 October 1879. The link from the Kilsyth line to the Campsie branch was a short spur between Kelvin Valley East and West Junctions.

=== The Strathendrick and Aberfoyle Railway ===
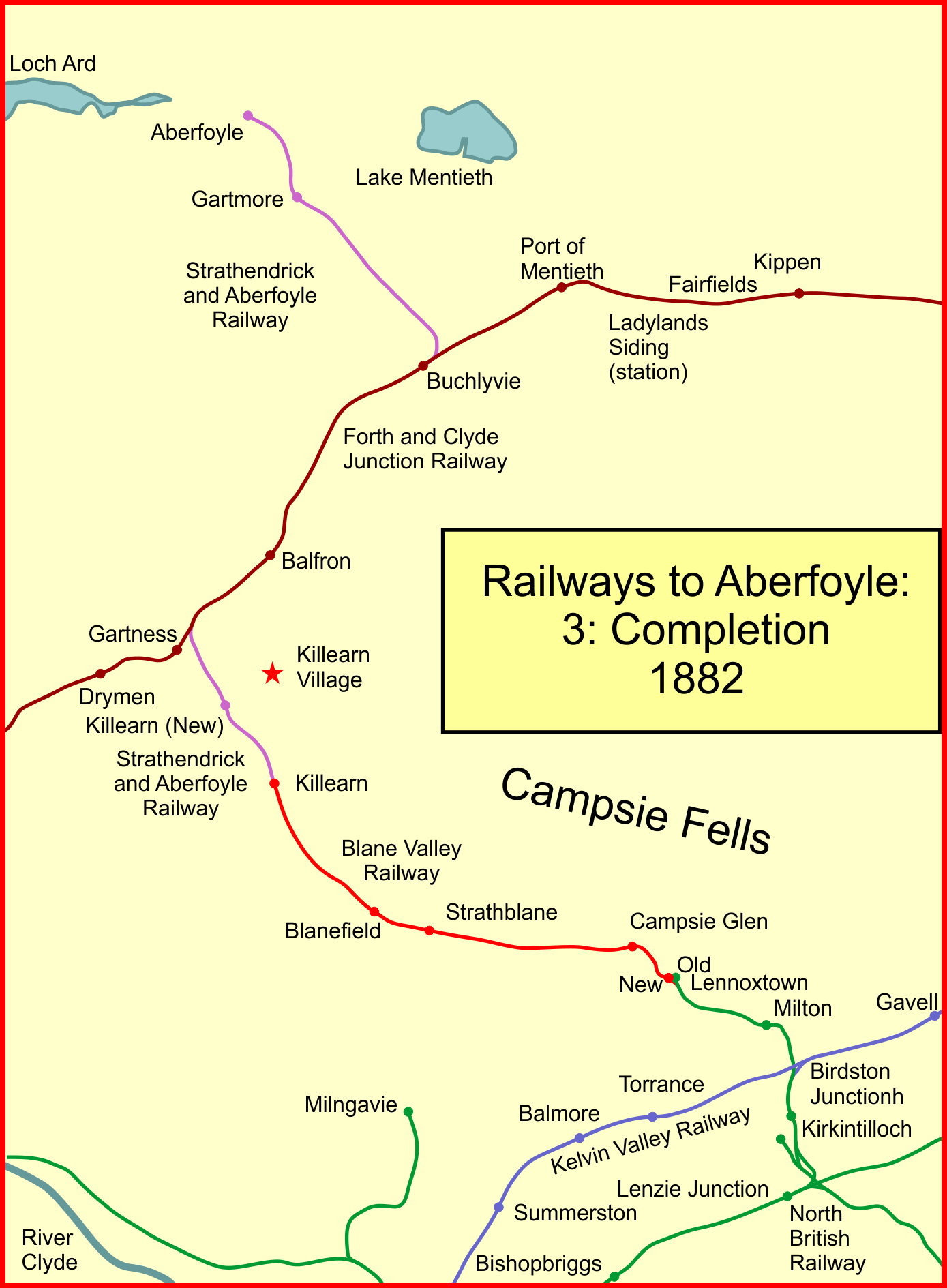
Reaching Aberfoyle in 1882

The Blane Valley Railway had planned to reach the Trossachs, but had run out of money a little way south of Killearn. On 16 September 1879 James Keyden, the driving force behind the Blane Valley line, held a meeting at which a Strathendrick and Loch Lomond Railway was proposed. This would continue from the Blane Valley line from Killearn through Aberfoyle to Inversnaid, on the east shore of Loch Lomond. However the Duke of Montrose, who owned much of the land in the Trossachs, was opposed to the scheme and it fell into temporary abeyance.

In October 1879 Keyden proposed a modified scheme, that would run from Killearn to Aberfoyle. The Forth and Clyde Junction Railway had been opened between Balloch and Stirling in 1856, and the Aberfoyle line would run over the F&CJR between Gartness and Buchyvie, then striking north again to reach Aberfoyle. A private road was to be built from Aberfoyle to Loch Katrine, and a connecting coach service would run to Loch Lomond.

The railway would be called the Strathendrick and Aberfoyle Railway, and the North British Railway and the Blane Valley Railway promised financial support. (In fact the Blane Valley company subscribed £11,000, but there were extreme sensitivities among NBR shareholders about the allocation of the company's capital, and the chairman had to undertake that the NBR would not be subscribing for shares.) The cost of construction was estimated at £51,947. On 12 August 1880 the Strathendrick and Aberfoyle Railway was authorised. Seven months later subscribed capital amounted to £7,534, but nonetheless tenders were invited for construction. Kennedy tendered £29,682. The meeting to award the contract was in progress when Kennedy learnt that a competitor had tendered £28,521. He burst into the tender meeting and declared that a mistake had been made in his tender, and that it should have been £28,435, and that he would take some stock in the company if necessary. This astonishing irregularity was overlooked and Kennedy was awarded the contract.

The North British Railway now heard of the contract award when only a quarter of the contract sum had been subscribed, and demanded that the contract be cancelled. The Strathendrick set about a further round of canvassing for subscriptions, with various dubious benefits offered. Kennedy subscribed a further £20,000 and was given a directorship. The North British Railway also insisted on its own technical standards for the line being observed; the S&AR had intended lower standards and cheaper construction, but the NBR declined to work the line in that case.

The NBR Engineer inspected the progress in the summer of 1882 and found that Kennedy's work was seriously deficient, and Kennedy was required to make good the shortcomings. The line was submitted to Major-General Hutchinson of the Board of Trade on 27 July 1882, (Note: Thomas says 1880 but this must be a misprint.) but he found it unfit to accept traffic of any kind; in particular he objected to a proposal to have the signalling arranged as a long tablet section from Lennoxtown (the junction with the NBR Campsie Branch) to Gartness Junction (on the F&CJR), and he insisted on a tablet station being provided at Killearn station. The line was opened on 1 October 1882, with full public operation the following day. (Note: Paterson says 1 August 1882, on page 81 and page 280.)

The passenger train service was from Glasgow Queen Street to Aberfoyle, the entire line being worked as a throughout route. (Note: Of course the Forth and Clyde Junction trains ran normally on their own route.) However the S&AR complained that the timetable adopted by the NBR was "most unsatisfactory and disappointing". Aberfoyle station was not equipped to handle cattle traffic that was on offer, nor to crane quarried stone that was brought to the line from the extensive quarries nearby.

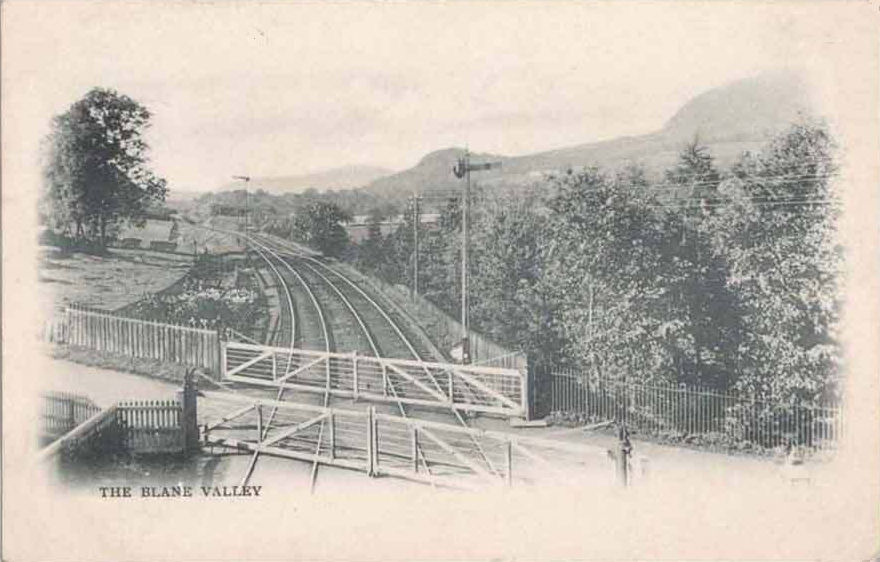
View from Blanefield station

A new Killearn station was opened, nearer the village than the Blane Valley Railway station of the same name. The inevitable confusion for passengers was only partly reduced by renaming the station New Killearn and the Blane Valley station Old Killearn. The Blane Valley station was later named Dumgoyn Hill after a local beauty spot, and later again renamed Dumgoyne.

The coach link with Inversnaid failed to be started, as the road intended to be used was little more than a farm track. However the toll road to Loch Katrine was built, its cost being shared with the North British Railway, the Duke of Montrose, and the Aberfoyle Quarry. The road proved immensely popular with tourists and regularly provided income to the railway company.

The company badly needed the money; in its first three months of operation its revenue was £138, £88 and £82 respectively.

Keyden now projected a further railway across the sparsely populated terrain: a proposed Milngavie, Strathendrick and Port of Mentieth Railway. A director of the Blane Valley observed that "it is directly antagonistic to our interests and bound to abstract a large amount of traffic". Keyden was secretary of the S&AR (Note: Thomas, volume 2 page 131, is ambiguous as to whether this related to the S&AR or the BVR.) and at the next board meeting, in an office provided by himself, was required to record his own dismissal in the minute book. He added that he expected a year's salary in lieu of notice, but the directors erased that part of Keyden's entry from the official record.

=== Absorption ===
On 1 August 1891 the S&AR and the BVR were absorbed by the North British Railway.

=== Passenger train service ===
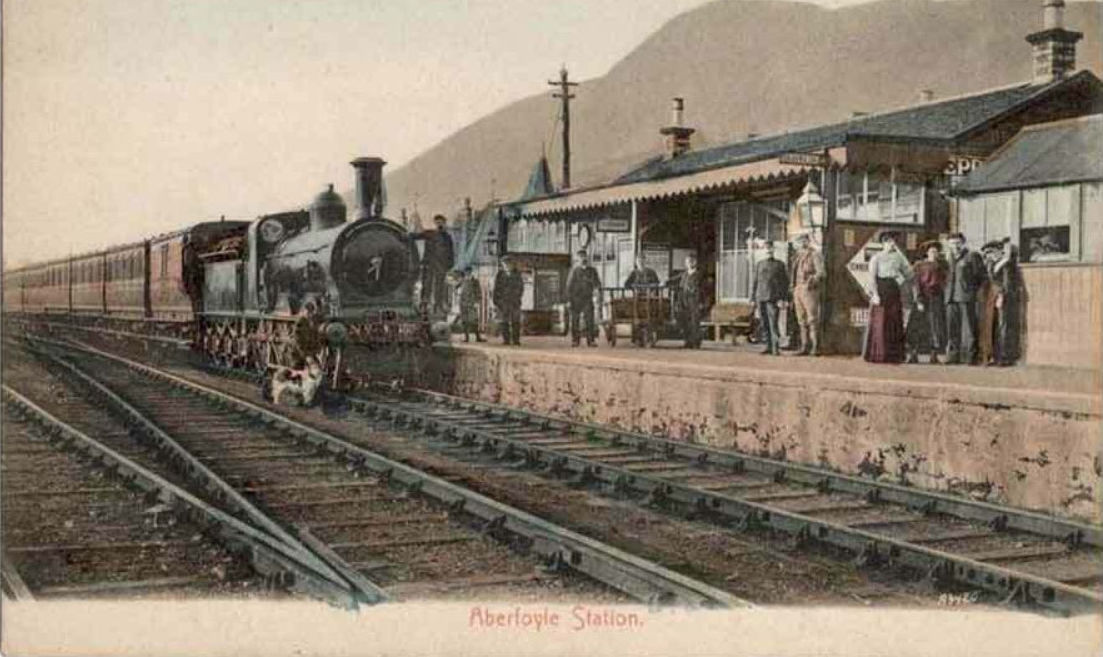
Aberfoyle railway station with train ready to load

The 1895 Bradshaw shows four through journeys daily from Glasgow Queen Street to Aberfoyle; the trains called at both Killearn (Old station) and Killearn (New station); there were also a number of short journeys. In addition there were five trains from Queen Street to Kilsyth and Bonnybridge Central, running over the line from Campsie Junction to Kilsyth West Junction.

By 1922 the service had been augmented to 6 trains daily, with a typical journey time of 105 minutes; there were also several short journeys on the line. Two trains gave road connections to the Trossachs; for example the 08:08 train from Queen Street gave a connection to the Trossachs arriving at 11:15. There were also four trains running from Queen Street to Kilsyth New and Bonnybridge Central.

In 1938 there were seven journeys but all except one of these required a change of train at Blanefield, in most cases into the Sentinel rail car (see below). There were also seven journeys from Queen Street to Kilsyth.

== Decline and closure ==
By the 1920s the rail services were suffering heavily from competition from cheaper and more flexible services offered by charabanc and motor bus operators. Passenger services on the Forth and Clyde Junction Railway from Stirling to Loch Lomond were suspended entirely from 1934, with the Aberfoyle passenger service continuing for the time being, on the section of the F&CJR between Gartness Junction and Buchlyvie. Soon most services from Glasgow terminated at Blanefield, and passengers for Aberfoyle had to change there for a shuttle service operated by a Sentinel steam railcar.

By the summer of 1950 Kirkintilloch was served by twelve trains a day; Lennoxtown by seven; Blanefield by five; and Aberfoyle by three. The line from Kirkintilloch to Aberfoyle closed to passengers the next year, on 1 October 1951. The Aberfoyle line north of Campsie Glen closed completely eight years later, with the ending of the remaining goods services in October 1959.

The original Campsie Branch part of the line lasted a little longer, but in 1964 the last remaining passenger services to Kirkintilloch were ended, followed in April 1966 by closure of the final remaining goods services to Lennoxtown, and the entire line was closed and soon lifted.

== Topography ==
Campsie branch of the Edinburgh and Glasgow Railway; opened 5 July 1848.

- Kirkintilloch Junction; the line diverged from the Glasgow to Edinburgh line; the junction was later known as Campsie Junction;
- Middlemuir Junction; loop line from Woodley Junction on former M&KR line converges;
- Back o' Loch Halt; opened 21 September 1925; closed 7 September 1964;
- Kirkintilloch; closed 7 September 1964;
- Birdston Junction; divergence of spur to Kelvin Valley line; later known as Kelvin Valley West Junction;
- Miltown; renamed Milton 1874; renamed Milton of Campsie 1912; closed 1 October 1951;
- Lennoxtown Junction; divergence of the Blane Valley Railway from 1866;
- Lennoxtown; renamed Lennoxtown (Old) 1867; closed 1 October 1881.

Blane Valley Railway; opened 5 November 1866.

- Lennoxtown Junction; see above;
- Lennoxtown (Blane Valley); renamed Lennoxtown 1881; closed 1 October 1951;
- Campsie Glen; opened 1 July 1867; closed 1 January 1917; reopened 1 February 1919; closed 1 October 1951;
- Strathblane; opened 1 July 1867; closed 1 October 1951;
- Blanefield; opened February 1868; closed 1 October 1951;
- Killearn; renamed Killearn Old 1 October 1882; renamed Dumgoyne Hill 1 April 1896; the spelling Dumgoyn was also used; renamed Dumgoyne 28 September 1897; closed 1 October 1951;

Strathendrick and Aberfoyle Railway; opened 2 October 1882.

- Killearn (Blane Valley Railway); see above;
- Killearn New; renamed Killearn 1 April 1896; closed 1 October 1951;
- Gartness Junction; route converged with Forth and Clyde Junction Railway;
- Balfron; F&CJR station, opened 26 May 1856; closed 1 October 1951;
- Buchlyvie; F&CJR station, opened 26 May 1856; closed 1 October 1951; route diverged from Forth and Clyde Junction Railway;
- Gartmore; closed 2 January 1950;
- Aberfoyle; closed 1 October 1951.

== Re-use as Strathkelvin Railway Path ==
The section of the line between Kirkintilloch and Strathblane has been reused as part of the Strathkelvin Railway Path.
