= Blane Valley Railway =

Former railway line in Scotland

Overview
- Locale: Scotland
- Dates of operation: 12 August 1880–5 August 1891
- Successor: North British Railway

Technical
- Track gauge: 4 ft 8 1/2 in (1,435 mm)

Blane Valley Railway Act 1861
- Act of Parliament
- Parliament of the United Kingdom
- Long title: An Act for making a Railway from Lennoxtown of Campsie to Strathblane, with a Branch to Lettermill in the County of Stirling, and for other Purposes.
- Citation: 24 & 25 Vict. c. ccxlviii

Dates
- Royal assent: 6 August 1861

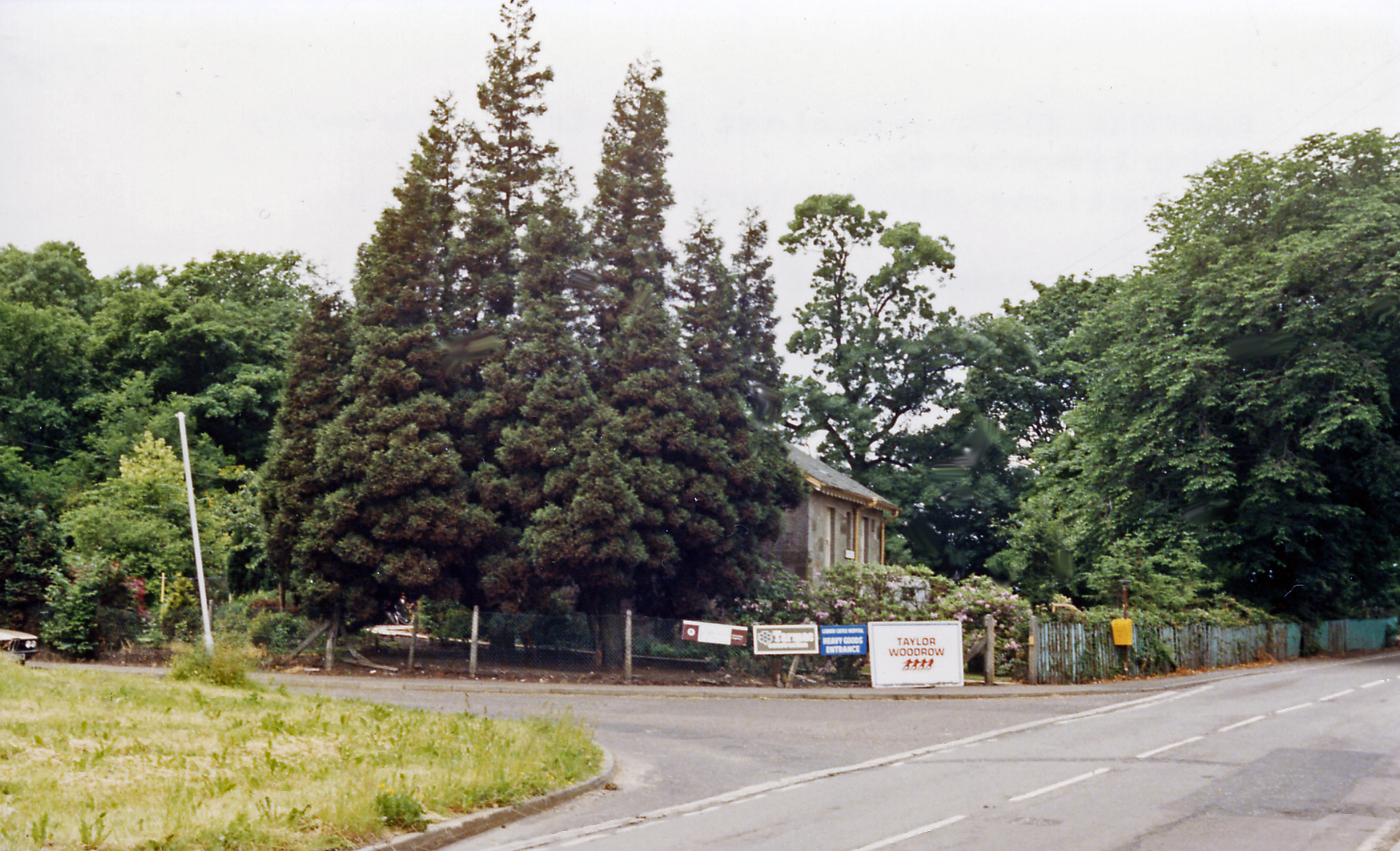
Site of Campsie Glen station

The Blane Valley Railway was a railway line in Scotland to the east of Glasgow. It is now closed. In 1891 the railway company was absorbed by the North British Railway, which had operated the line and been a major shareholder from the start. When NBR took over the line was in a poor state. The goods shed was inadequate for the amount of traffic, the only crane was too small and siding accommodation was deficient. There was considerable potential for the transportation of cattle in the area but there were no facilities in place. Capital was invested and the line transformed. The locomotives were cleaned and the stations given a makeover. Close attention was given to the cleanliness of staff and the neatness of their uniforms. The railway was the only means of transport for the people living in the area and was a source of much pride. In 1923 following the grouping it became part of London and North Eastern Railway. Following nationalisation in 1947, it was taken over by British Railways. Unable to compete in the face of road competition, the line was closed to passengers in 1951 and closed completely in 1959.

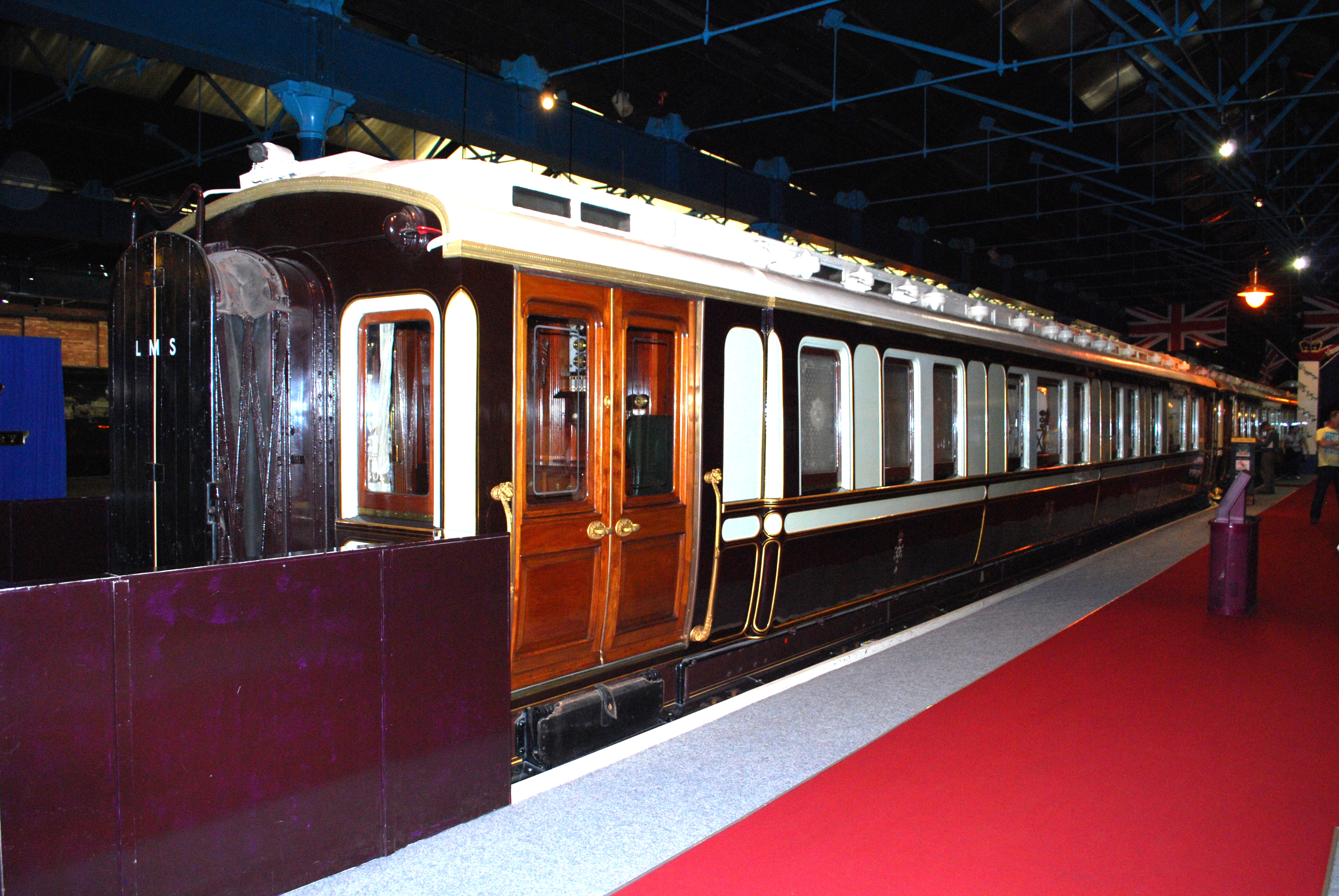
Part of King Edward VII's Royal Train. Now held at the National Railway Museum, York

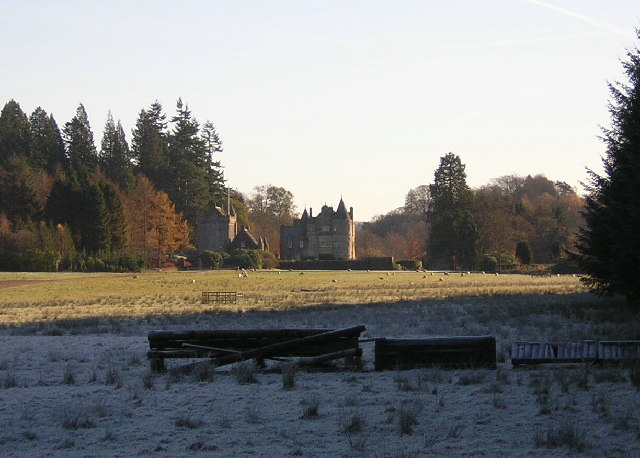
Duntreath Castle

== History ==
The Blane Valley Railway, extended the Campsie Branch of the Edinburgh and Glasgow Railway into the countryside immediately south of the Campsie Fells. In this sparsely populated area the main item of carriage for the line was expected to be milk to be taken to Glasgow. An act for the new railway was obtained on 6 August 1861. The eight and a quarter miles opened for freight in November 1866 and passengers in July 1867 as far as a station named Killearn. In fact the station was about two miles short of Killearn. When the Strathendrick and Aberfoyle Railway extended the route in the 1880s a new station was built at Killearn with the previous station of that name renamed as Dumgoyne. A new station was built at Lennoxtown to by-pass the previous Campsie Branch terminus there. Duntreath Castle was close to the line. The Edmonstone family had a railway halt installed at the Castle; Alice Keppel, née Edmonstone, the mistress of Edward VII, lived there. The Royal Train bearing the king was believed to have used the line from time to time. Throughout its life the line had been used by through trains from Glasgow to Aberfoyle. However, in the closing years, the service terminated at Blanefield with a separate single coach train running to Aberfoyle and back. This service was little used and would sometimes run without a single passenger.

== Closure ==
By summer 1950 Blanefield was being served by five trains a day. The line closed to passengers the next year, on 1 October 1951. The line north from Campsie Glen closed completely eight years later, with the ending of the remaining goods services in October 1959. In April 1966 the final remaining goods services operated, and the remaining line was closed and the tracks and infrastructure removed. Parts of this railway track are now used by long-distance walking routes, the West Highland Way and the John Muir Way. The southern section to Strathblane is used by the Strathkelvin Railway Path - a cycle / foot path.
