= North Clyde Line =

Railway line in Glasgow City, Scotland

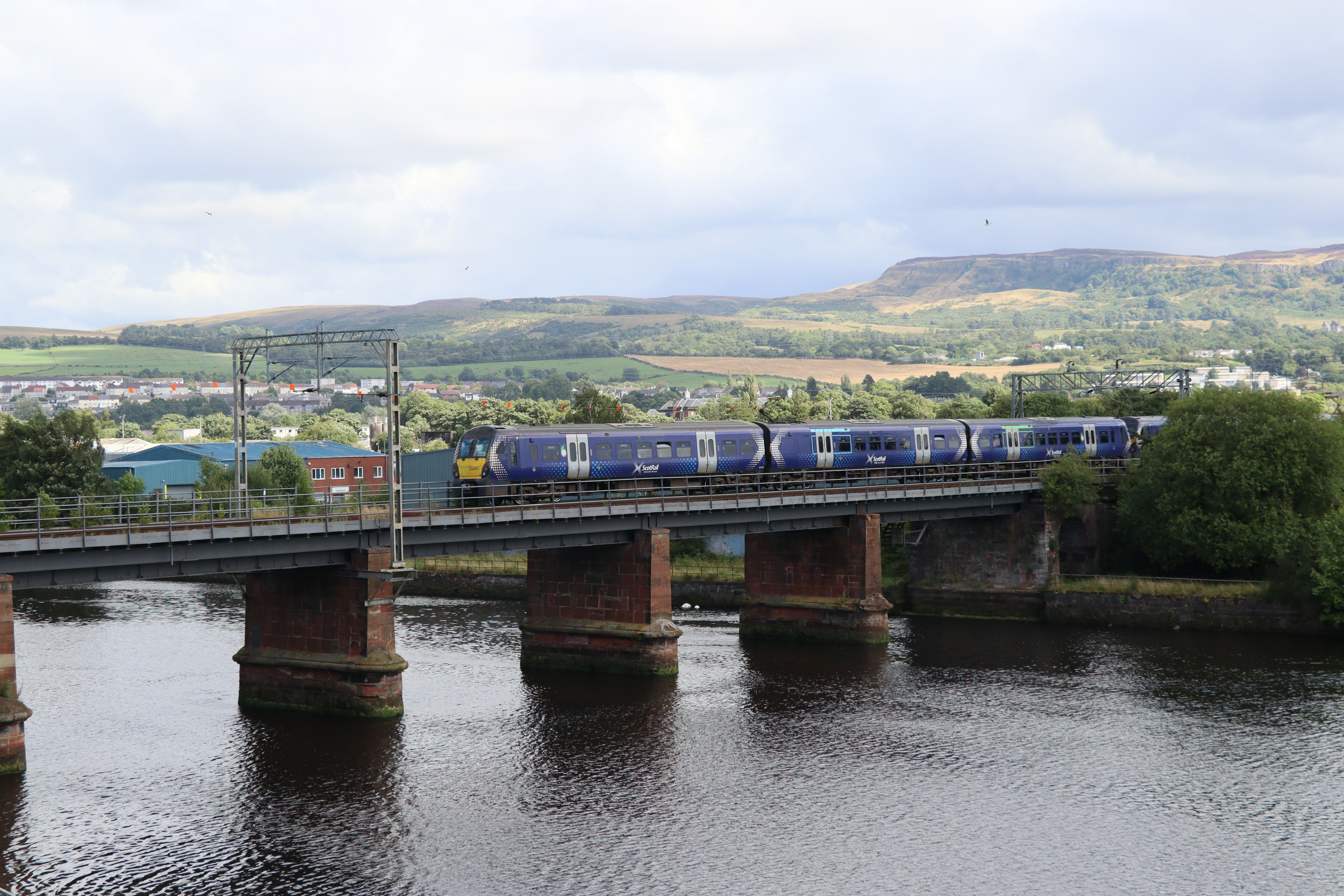
- A Class 334 crosses the River Leven between Dumbarton Central and Dalreoch

Overview
- Status: Operational
- Owner: Network Rail
- Locale: Glasgow; Edinburgh; Scotland
- Termini: West Helensburgh Central Balloch Dalmuir Milngavie; East Cumbernauld Airdrie Bathgate Edinburgh Waverley
- Stations: 57 (including Cumbernauld line)

Service
- Type: Heavy rail
- System: National Rail
- Operator: ScotRail
- Rolling stock: Class 334 "Juniper"; Class 320; Class 318

Technical
- Number of tracks: Double track
- Track gauge: 1,435 mm (4 ft 8 1/2 in)
- Electrification: 25 kV 50 Hz AC
- Operating speed: Max 90 mph (145 km/h)
Route map
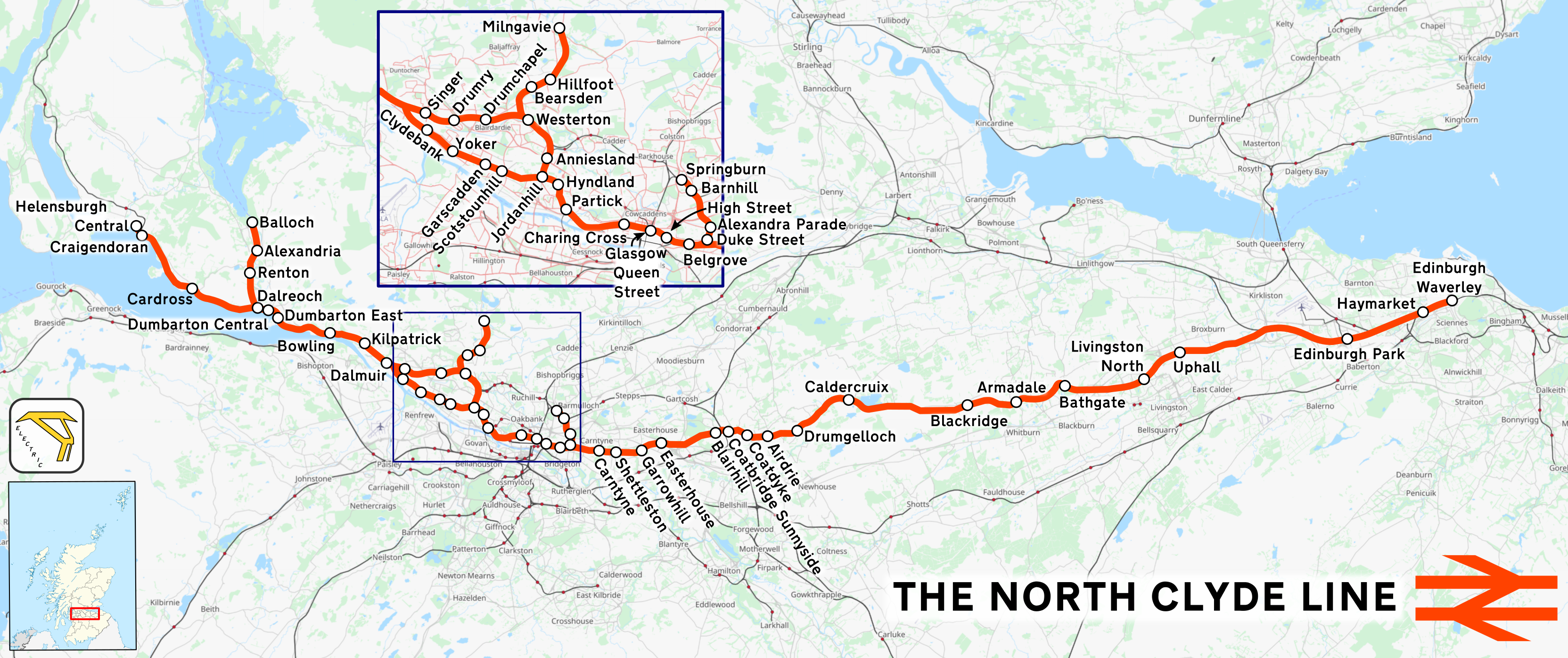
(Click to expand)

The North Clyde Line (defined by Network Rail as the Glasgow North Electric Suburban line) is a suburban railway in West Central Scotland. The route is operated by ScotRail. As a result of the incorporation of the Airdrie–Bathgate rail link and the Edinburgh–Bathgate line, this route has become the fourth rail link between Glasgow and Edinburgh.

== Route ==
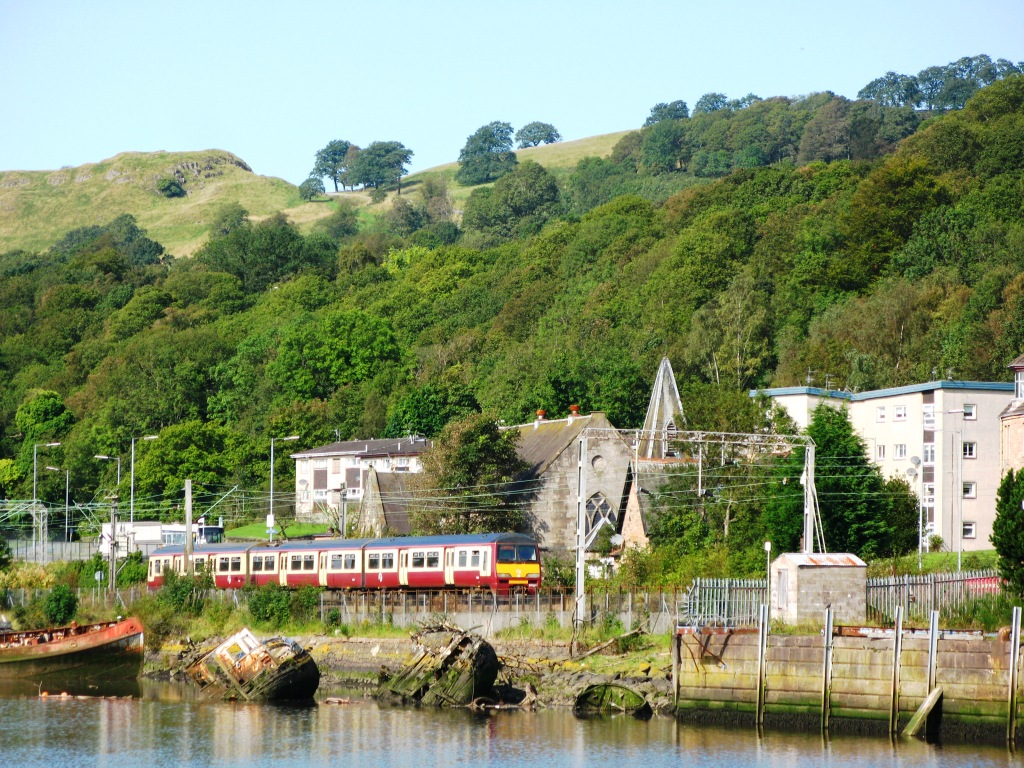
Alongside the Clyde at Bowling Harbour

The North Clyde Line (known as Dunbartonshire - Glasgow, Cumbernauld and Falkirk Grahamston in timetables), electrified by British Rail in 1960, ran east–west through the Greater Glasgow conurbation, linking northern Lanarkshire with western Dunbartonshire, by way of the city centre. Fifty years later, in 2010, the line was extended by Network Rail east from Airdrie, by way of re-opening the line to Bathgate meeting up with the line re-opened by British Rail from Edinburgh.

The main core of the route runs from Edinburgh Waverley to Helensburgh Central via Bathgate and Glasgow Queen Street (Low Level). To the east of the Glasgow city centre, there is a short branch to Springburn, while to the west there are two routes between Hyndland and Dalmuir (via Singer and via Yoker), as well as branches to Milngavie and Balloch.

The lines from Partick to Dalmuir and Milngavie are also used by Argyle Line services, whilst West Highland Line services share the line between Westerton and Craigendoran. In the east, the line between Newbridge Junction and Edinburgh Waverley is shared with the Glasgow to Edinburgh via Falkirk Line and the Edinburgh to Dunblane Line. In addition to the interchange with services from Glasgow Queen Street (High Level) and Edinburgh Waverley, there are interchanges with the Cumbernauld Line at Springburn, with the Maryhill Line at Anniesland, and with the Glasgow Subway at Partick. Some sections of the North Clyde Line are also traversed by freight trains.

The line runs through central Glasgow, and the principal station on the line is Glasgow Queen Street (Low Level). The section through the city centre largely runs in tunnels between High Street and the former Finnieston station (west of Charing Cross at the intersection of Argyle Street and Kent Road). This is the oldest stretch of underground railway in Glasgow, opened as the Glasgow City & District Railway in 1886 and predating the Glasgow Subway by some ten years.

== History ==
=== Lists of Openings, Closures, and Re-openings ===
==== Constituents ====
Like most of Glasgow's suburban railways, the North Clyde Lines as they are known today were built piecemeal from a patchwork of routes from various Victorian-era railway companies. In addition to the extension east of Airdrie, these are listed below:

- 1842 - Haymarket to Newbridge Junction opened by Edinburgh and Glasgow Railway;
- 1846 - Edinburgh Waverley to Haymarket opened by Edinburgh and Glasgow Railway;
- 1849 - Newbridge Junction to Polkemmet Junction opened by Edinburgh and Bathgate Railway;
- 1850 - Dumbarton Central to Balloch Pier opened by Caledonian and Dunbartonshire Junction Railway;
- 1858 - Cowlairs to Bowling and Dalreoch to Helensburgh Central opened by Glasgow, Dumbarton and Helensburgh Railway;
- 1862 - Polkemmet Junction to Coatbridge Sunnyside opened by Bathgate and Coatbridge Railway;
- 1863 - Westerton to Milngavie opened by Glasgow and Milngavie Junction Railway;
- 1870 - Coatbridge Sunnyside to Bellgrove opened as the Coatbridge Branch of North British Railway;
- 1870 - Bellgrove to High Street Junction opened by City of Glasgow Union Railway;
- 1871 - High Street Junction to College opened as the Coatbridge Branch of North British Railway;
- 1874 - Stobcross to Maryhill opened by Stobcross Railway;
- 1874 - Anniesland to Whiteinch opened by Whiteinch Railway;
- 1875 - Springburn to Bellgrove opened by City of Glasgow Union Railway;
- 1882 - Jordanhill to Clydebank East opened by Glasgow, Yoker and Clydebank Railway;
- 1886 - High Street to Stobcross, Hyndland branch, Jordanhill cord, and Anniesland to Westerton cord opened by Glasgow City and District Railway;
- 1891 - Bowling to Dumbarton Central opened by Lanarkshire and Dunbartonshire Railway;
- 1892 - Bridgeton Central to High Street opened by Glasgow City and District Railway;
- 1897 - Clydebank to Dalmuir opened by Glasgow, Yoker and Clydebank Railway;

The majority of these lines were absorbed by (or were subsidiaries of) the North British Railway; the exceptions being the Lanarkshire and Dunbartonshire Railway, which was part of the Caledonian Railway, and the western part of the Caledonian and Dunbartonshire Junction Railway (which was joint between the North British and the Caledonian). At the time of the Grouping in 1923, the North British Railway became part of the London and North Eastern Railway (LNER), while the Caledonian Railway became part of the London, Midland and Scottish Railway (LMS).

==== Closures ====
Following nationalisation in 1948, all of the lines came under the ownership of British Railways. A number of former LNER branch lines which fed into the North Clyde system were closed during the 1950s because they duplicated former LMS lines. Other lines closed due to lack of traffic, or later because they were not selected for inclusion in the electrification project. Notable withdrawals of passenger service occurred on:

- 1 May 1930: Manuel and Bathgate to Coatbridge Central (via Blackstone);
- 2 April 1951: Whiteinch Victoria branch, also the Kelvin Valley Line (Maryhill to Kilsyth);
- 10 September 1951: Bothwell to Coatbridge Sunnyside;
- 15 September 1952: Hamilton to Bothwell;
- 4 July 1955: Bothwell to Shettleston;
- 9 January 1956: Ratho to Airdrie;
- 14 September 1959: Clydebank East terminus;
- 5 November 1960: Hyndland branch (replaced by new Hyndland station on main line)
- 5 November 1979: Bridgeton Central branch (replaced by Bridgeton on the Argyle Line)
- 28 September 1986: Balloch Central to Balloch Pier

==== Re-openings ====
- 24 March 1986: Newbridge Junction to Bathgate (passenger services)
- May 1989: Airdrie to Drumgelloch
- 18 October 2010: Drumgelloch to Bathgate (line open for driver training and charter trains)
- 12 December 2010: Drumgelloch to Bathgate (passenger services)

=== Electrification ===
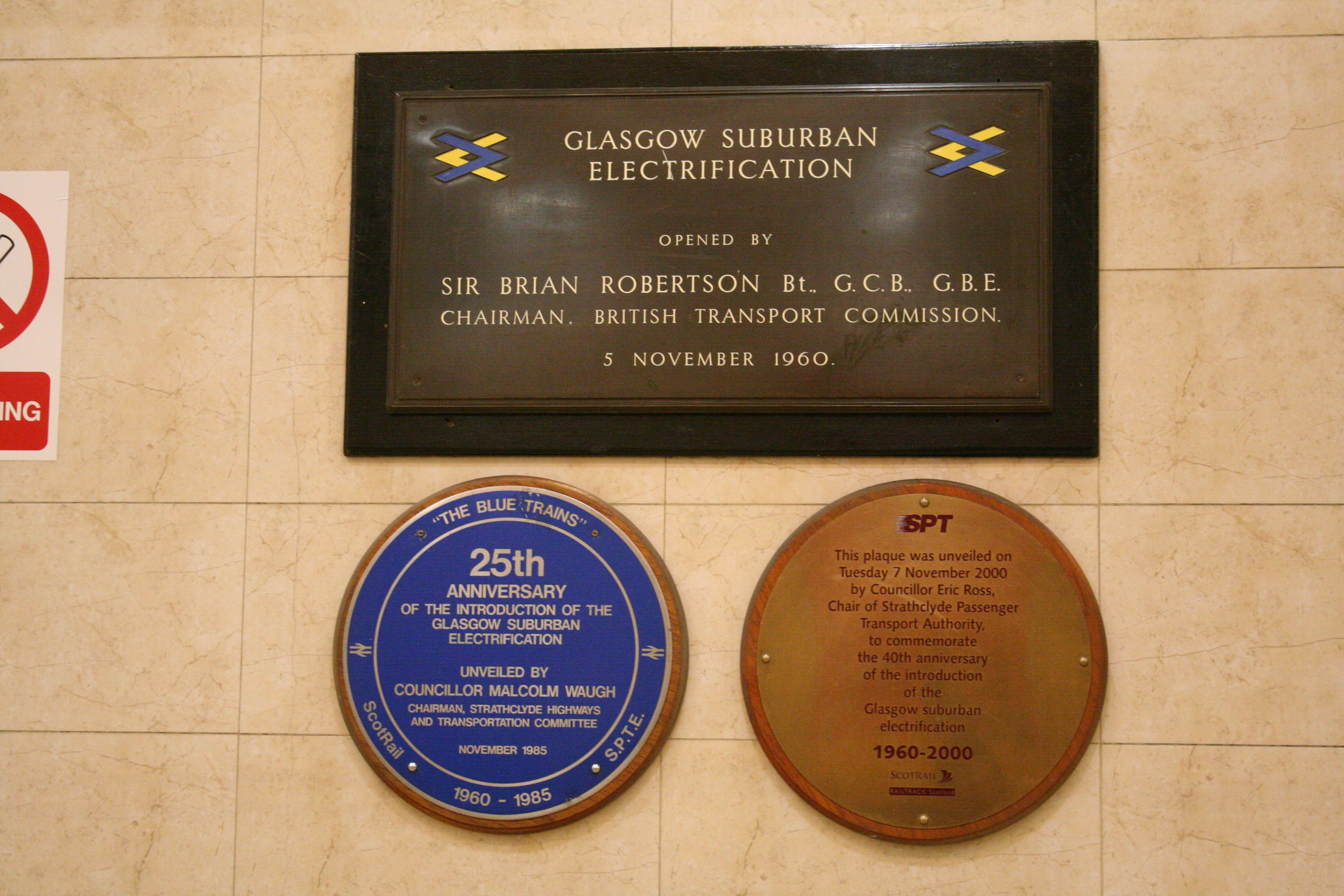
A plaque commemorating the Glasgow suburban electrification by the entrance to the North Clyde Line platforms at Glasgow Queen Street

In 1960 the remainder of the North Clyde suburban system (Airdrie, Springburn and Bridgeton Central to Milngavie, Balloch Pier and Helensburgh Central, including both routes between Partick and Dalmuir) underwent electrification. After a ceremony on Saturday 5 November 1960, a free public service of electric trains ran on Sunday, and the full normal advertised public service started on Monday 7 November 1960. A new junction between the former LNER and LMS lines was built at Dunglass, just west of Bowling, allowing North Clyde Line services to use the former LMS (Lanarkshire and Dunbartonshire) line through Dumbarton East, and the original LNER (Caledonian and Dunbartonshire Junction) line from Dunglass to Dumbarton Central was closed. The outer areas were electrified to the 25 kV AC 50 Hz standard, with the central area, the Springburn, Bridgeton, and Milngavie branches, and the Yoker line being at 6.25 kV AC due to restricted clearances in tunnels. As insulation technology improved these lines were eventually converted to 25 kV.

In October 2010, the line between Bathgate and Airdrie opened complete with electrification at 25 kV for crew training and charter trains. The section between Bathgate and Haymarket (including the section that is common with the Glasgow to Edinburgh via Falkirk Line east of Newbridge Junction) was also electrified at 25 kV. This work was carried out as part of the Airdrie-Bathgate Rail Link.

=== Argyle line ===
The former Caledonian Railway lines in north-west Glasgow and Dunbartonshire (Lanarkshire and Dunbartonshire Railway and Glasgow Central Railway) closed to passengers and then freight. However, the section from Rutherglen through Glasgow Central (Low Level) was reopened as the Argyle Line in 1979. A new flying junction was built east of Partick to connect the Argyle Line with the North Clyde Line. The Bridgeton Central branch closed to passengers on 5 November 1979, having been replaced by the re-opened Bridgeton Cross station on the Argyle Line, though Bridgeton Central station was retained as a carriage cleaning facility. On 17 December 1979, Partickhill station was replaced by the new Partick (Interchange) slightly to the south, which provides a connection with the Subway.

A short electrified link to the east of Blairhill in the Gartsherrie area of Coatbridge also connects the two lines together, but is only used as a diversionary path for Argyle Line services to run over the North Clyde whenever the route via Glasgow Central (Low Level) is closed - an example of this was in December 1994 when severe flooding closed the main spine of the Argyle Line for nine months, forcing Dalmuir-Lanark services to run via Glasgow Queen Street (Low Level).

=== Balloch Pier ===
Pleasure steamer operations on Loch Lomond ceased in the 1980s, leading to the closure of Balloch Pier on 28 September 1986. The Balloch branch was further truncated in April 1988 when Balloch Central was replaced by the new Balloch station on the opposite site of Balloch Road, which allowed the elimination of a level crossing. The catenary from the closed section to Balloch Pier was then used to reopen the line east of Airdrie to a new terminus at Drumgelloch in May 1989.

=== Airdrie–Bathgate rail link ===
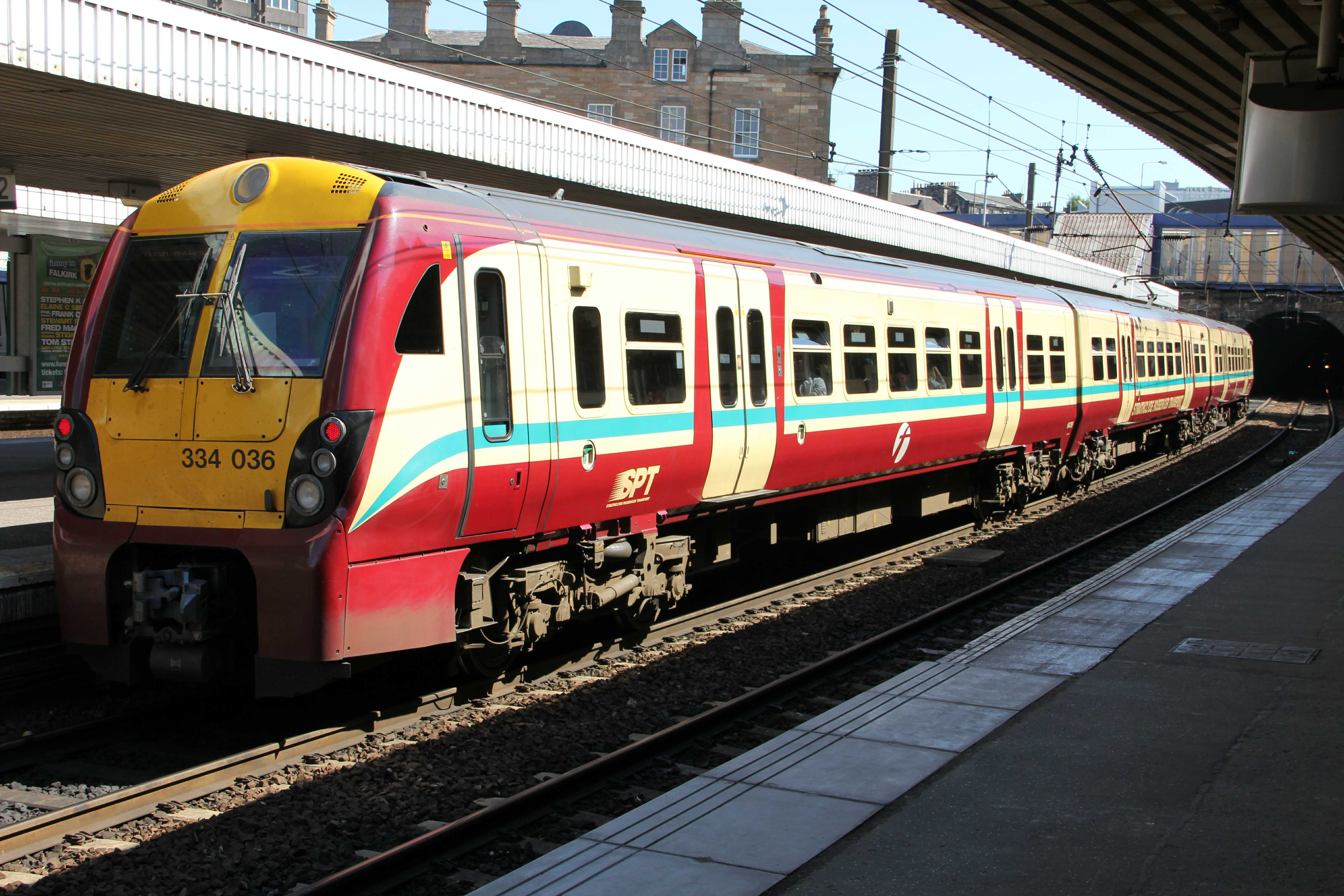
A Class 334 at Haymarket station in Edinburgh with a through service from Helensburgh

Passenger services from Edinburgh to Airdrie ceased in 1956, but the line between Edinburgh and Bathgate was reopened to passenger traffic on a trial basis in 1986 and proved an instant success. In 2005, the Scottish Executive declared that in line with plans to upgrade the remaining section of the A8 road to motorway standard, public transport links between Glasgow and Edinburgh must also be improved. Therefore, to create a fourth direct rail link between Glasgow and Edinburgh, the closed section of the Bathgate and Coatbridge Railway between Bathgate and the 1989 Drumgelloch station was re-opened, and the existing lines from Newbridge Junction to Bathgate and Drumgelloch to Airdrie were upgraded. The whole line is double track and electrified, with a maximum line speed of 90 mph (145 km/h). The existing 30-minute frequency Helensburgh–Drumgelloch and Milngavie–Airdrie services have been extended to Edinburgh Waverley providing an enhanced 15 minute frequency between Bathgate and Edinburgh.

The new link received the final approval of the Scottish Parliament on 28 March 2007 and gained Royal Assent on 9 May 2007. Work commenced with a sod cutting ceremony at Livingston North in June 2007, with reinstatement of double track between Newbridge and Bathgate being the first stage, completed in October 2008.

The line opened for driver training and charter trains in October 2010, with the passenger service commencing on 12 December 2010.

=== Cumbernauld Line ===
As part of the wider Edinburgh to Glasgow Improvement Programme (EGIP), plans were made to electrify the Cumbernauld Line and the Garngad Chord, adjacent to Springburn, creating an electrified link between the Springburn branch of the North Clyde Line and the Cumbernauld Line - then operated by diesel multiple units into Glasgow Queen Street High Level - allowing electric service from Cumbernauld into the Low Level of Glasgow Queen Street, and thus connecting Cumbernauld to destinations west of Glasgow, whilst also freeing up capacity on the High Level lines out of Queen Street. Contracts for the improvements were let out in January 2013, with completion scheduled in time for the 2014 Commonwealth Games. From May 2014, electric trains began running between Balloch/Dalmuir and Cumbernauld (Monday - Saturday) and Partick and Cumbernauld (Sunday) using class 318, 320, and 334. As the reinstatement of the Garngad Chord was cancelled, the through-service trains had to reverse at Springburn station. Following the completion of EGIP, through electric services from Glasgow Queen Street High Level to Edinburgh Waverley via Cumbernauld were introduced using new Class 385 units, replacing the services which previously reversed at Springburn.

== Service pattern ==
=== Off peak Monday to Saturday ===
- 2tph Helensburgh Central to Edinburgh (non-stop Dumbarton East-Dalmuir, Dalmuir-Hyndland until 8pm)
- 2tph Balloch to Airdrie (via Singer, after 8pm to Springburn)
- 2tph Milngavie to Springburn (After 8pm to Motherwell or Cumbernauld

Argyle Line services provide services from Glasgow Central (Low Level) to Milngavie, Dalmuir (via Yoker) and Dalmuir (via Singer) on 30 minute frequencies.

=== Sunday ===
- 2tph Helensburgh Central to Edinburgh (via Singer)
- 1tph Partick to Cumbernauld

Argyle Line services provide services from Glasgow Central (Low Level) to Balloch (via Yoker) and Milngavie on 30 minute frequencies.

== Rolling stock ==
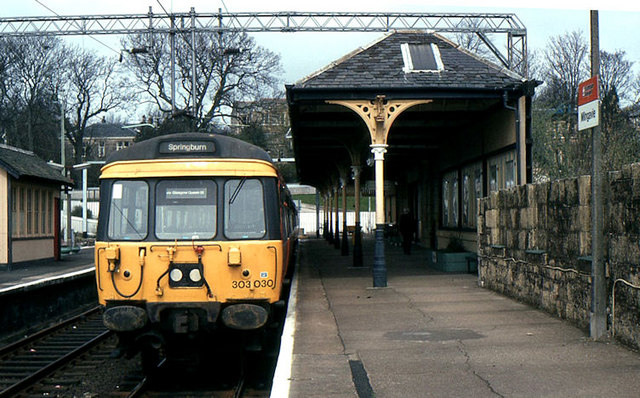
A Class 303 at Milngavie in 1985

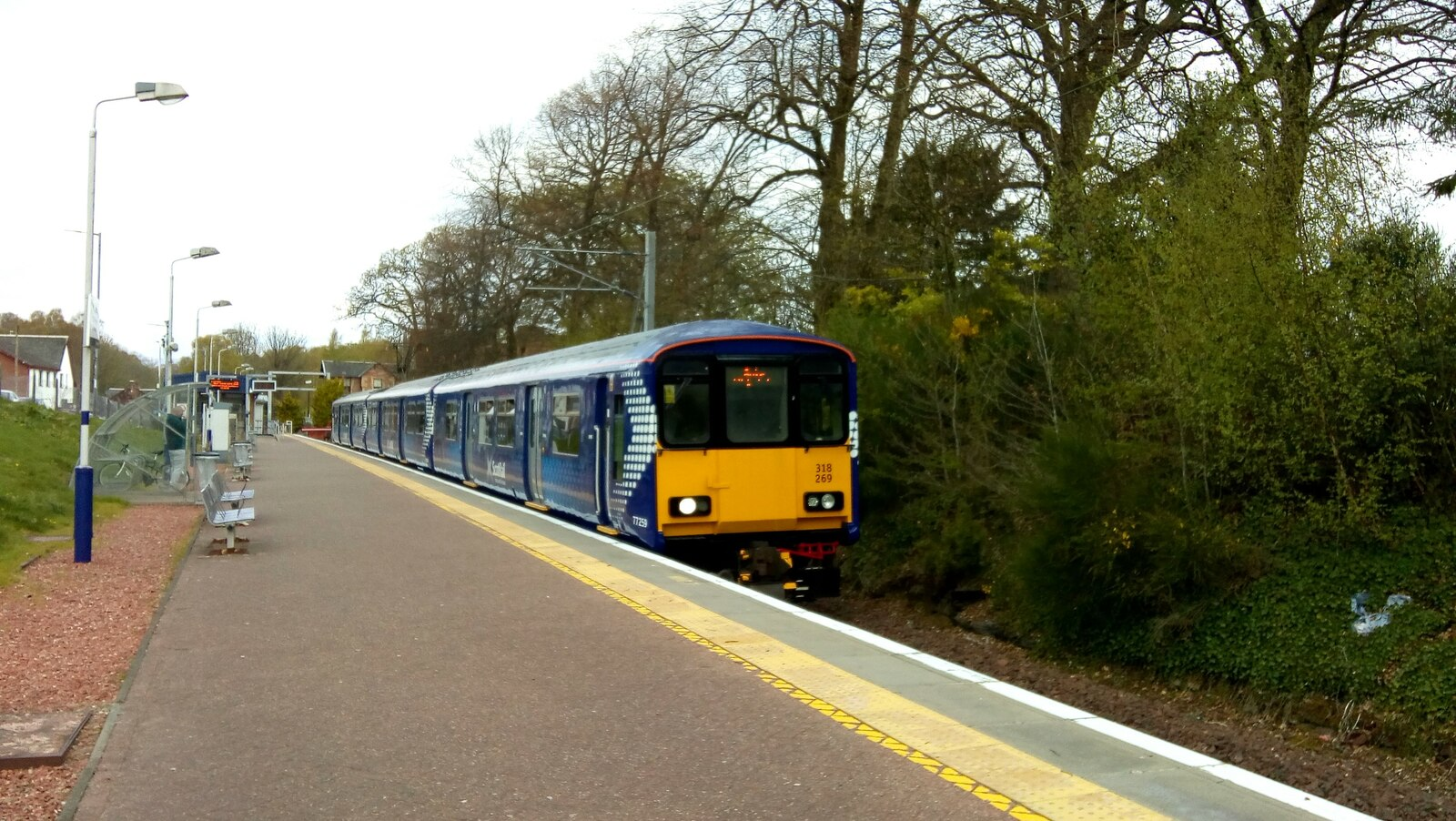
A Class 318 at Balloch

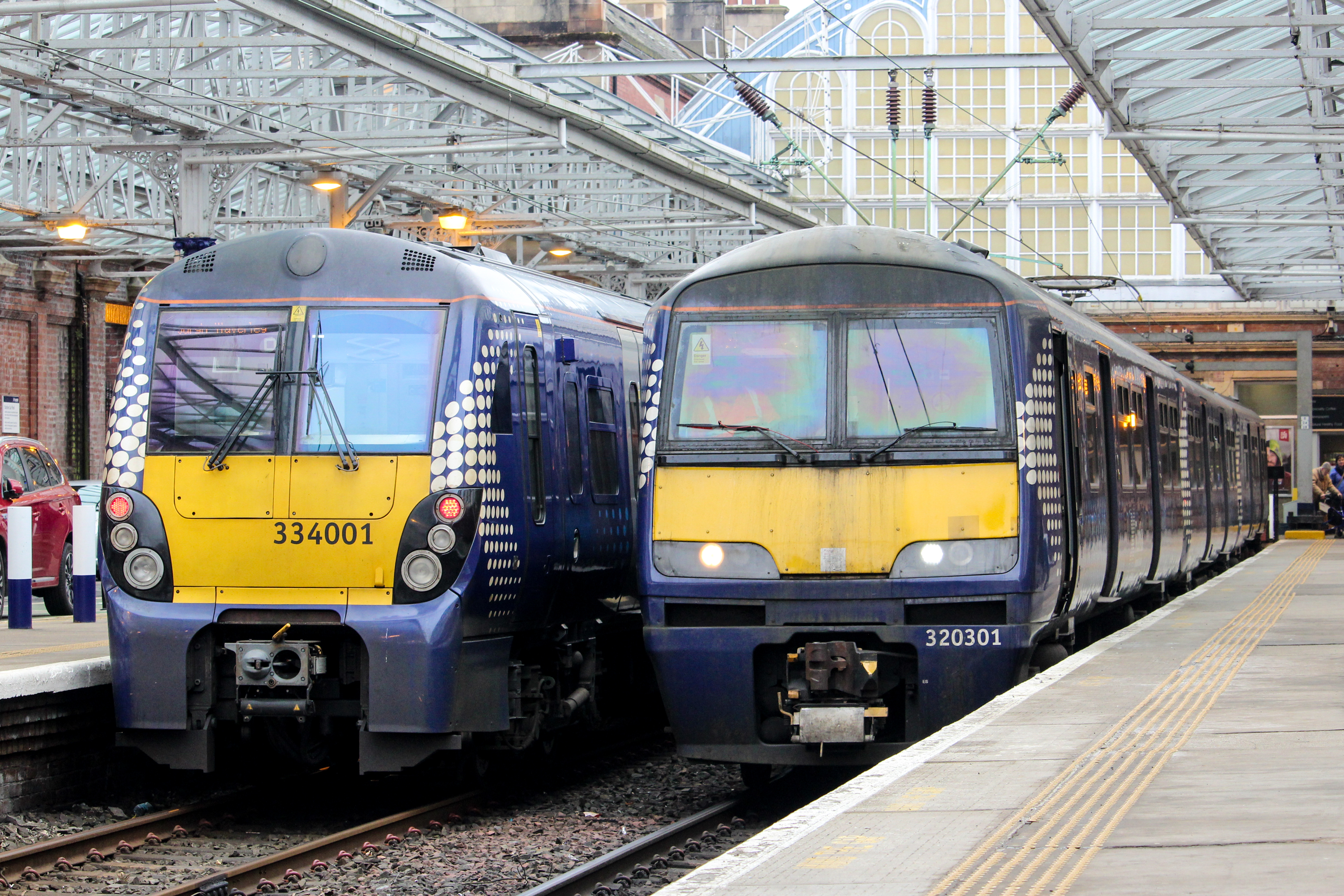
A Class 334 and a Class 320 at Helensburgh Central

=== Historic ===
Prior to electrification, passenger services were operated primarily by tank engines, notably Class N2 0-6-2T and Class V1/V3 2-6-2T, which were allocated to depots at Parkhead and Kipps (Coatbridge).

Electrification brought the introduction of locally-built Class 303 EMUs, operated from a new depot at the former Hyndland terminus station. From 1967 they were joined by the similar Class 311 EMUs, which were built for the Inverclyde Line electrification but which were initially allocated to Hyndland for maintenance and were occasionally used on the North Clyde Line. The Class 303 and 311 trains were nicknamed the "Blue Trains" because of the bright Caledonian Blue colour scheme they carried in the 1960s, at a time when most British Railways passenger stock was painted either green or maroon. In the late 1960s they began to be repainted in the new standard Rail Blue, and from the late 1970s they received coaching stock blue/grey livery. This was followed by the distinctive Strathclyde PTE orange-and-black scheme in the 1980s. A few of the last surviving Class 303s eventually received the new SPT carmine/cream livery in the late 1990s. In September 2008 Transport Scotland announced that the SPT carmine and cream livery would be discontinued; trains will start to be repainted in a new, blue livery with white Saltire motifs at the ends of each carriage.

In the 1970s, a new electric locomotive/EMU depot was built at Shields Road south of the Clyde, and this took over maintenance of the EMUs used on the Cathcart Circle and Inverclyde Lines, including all of the Class 311s. The reopening of the Argyle Line in 1979 resulted in the introduction of Class 314 EMUs, which were allocated to Hyndland. Although used almost exclusively on the Argyle Line, some North Clyde Line services were also operated by Class 314s. In 1987, Hyndland depot closed and was replaced by new carriage sidings at Yoker, with maintenance transferred to Shields Road. Thereafter, Class 311s began to appear more frequently on some North Clyde services. However, it was not until 1990 that a start was made on replacing the Class 303s, which still operated the great majority of services on the North Clyde Line.

Class 320 EMUs were introduced in 1990 and took over most North Clyde services, enabling the withdrawal of many Class 303s and all of the 311s. A few Class 303 units continued to operate on the North Clyde Line until December 2002, when they were finally withdrawn. They were replaced by the Class 334 Alstom Juniper EMUs, together with Class 318 units which had been cascaded from the Ayrshire Coast Lines. The Class 318s and 334s also replaced the Class 314 units on the Argyle Line, and these were in turn displaced to the Cathcart Circle and Inverclyde Lines to replace the last 303s.

=== Present stock ===
Class 334s currently operate services through to Edinburgh via Bathgate and a handful of North Clyde Line services, with Class 320s and Class 318s operating the majority of North Clyde Line services and Argyle Line services. Class 318s and Class 320s are not permitted to operate in service east of Airdrie due to the lack of CCTV and platform mirrors for the driver to check the doors; the Class 334s have CCTV installed onboard.

== Future development ==
=== Crossrail Glasgow ===
With many passengers travelling north–south through the city centre having to walk or use a shuttle bus between Central and Queen Street stations, SPT has long proposed a direct rail link between the North Clyde system and the lines radiating from Glasgow Central (High Level). This would allow direct service from Renfrewshire and Ayrshire stations to Glasgow Queen Street (Low Level), and would also allow new cross-city services such as Airdrie to Paisley. The plan would involve re-opening to passenger traffic the freight-only City Union Line between Shields Junction and Bellgrove, and building a new curve between Gallowgate and High Street. Reopening of the closed line from Strathbungo to Gorbals would allow trains from Barrhead and East Kilbride to use Crossrail. Funding for the scheme has yet to be sought, and the project remains a long-term aspiration only.

== Accidents and incidents ==
- On 11 September 1986 two railwaymen were killed in a collision between two trains at Bridgeton Central carriage sidings;
- On 6 March 1989 two people were killed when two trains collided head-on at Bellgrove.
