= Gallowgate Central railway station =

Former railway station in Scotland

Gallowgate Central
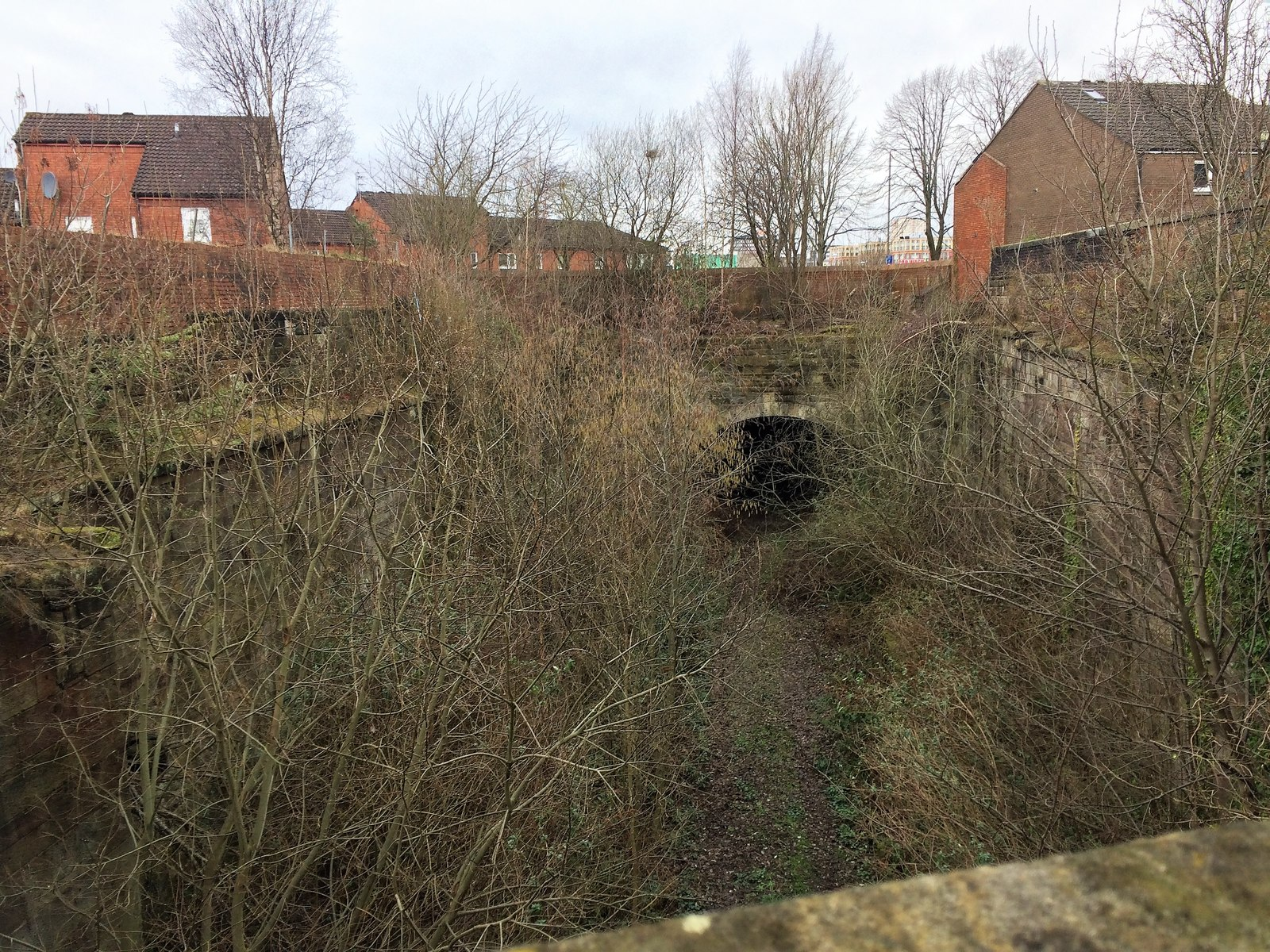
- The site of the station in 2019

General information
- Location: Gallowgate, Glasgow; Scotland
- Coordinates: 55.8554°N 4.2305°W
- Platforms: 2

Other information
- Status: Disused

History
- Original company: Glasgow City and District Railway
- Pre-grouping: North British Railway

Key dates
- 1 June 1892: Opened
- 1 January 1917: Closed
Location

Gallowgate Central railway station was located in Glasgow, Scotland and served the Calton area of that city via the Glasgow City and District Railway. Gallowgate Central was on the Bridgeton Central branch of the modern North Clyde line, now closed.

Preceding station	Historical railways	Following station
Bridgeton Central; Line and Station closed	Glasgow City and District Railway; North British Railway	High Street (Glasgow); Line closed; Station open
