= Gallowgate =

Gallowgate can refer to:

- Gallowgate, Newcastle upon Tyne, England
- Gallowgate, Glasgow, Scotland, a thoroughfare running east–west from Glasgow Cross to Parkhead Cross, part of the A89 road
- Gallowgate, Glasgow, a neighbourhood of the city adjacent to the aforesaid main road
- Gallowgate, Aberdeen, an old street in Aberdeen

== See also ==
- Gallowgate Barracks, built 1795 and now demolished, Glasgow
- Gallowgate Central railway station, a former railway station in Glasgow
