= Bridgeton Central railway station =

Disused railway station in Scotland

Bridgeton Central
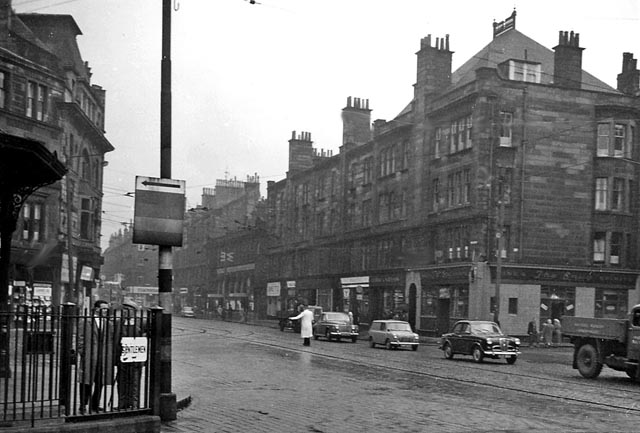

General information
- Location: Bridgeton, Glasgow; Scotland
- Coordinates: 55.8497°N 4.2277°W
- Platforms: 4

Other information
- Status: Disused

History
- Original company: Glasgow City and District Railway
- Pre-grouping: North British Railway

Key dates
- 1 June 1892: Opened as Bridgeton Cross
- January 1954: Renamed as Bridgeton Central
- 14 June 1965: Renamed as Bridgeton
- 5 November 1979: Closed
Location

Bridgeton Central railway station was located in Glasgow, Scotland and served the Bridgeton area of that city. On the Glasgow City and District Railway it was located on the modern North Clyde line on a branch from High Street and acted as a terminus for services from the north west of the city.

Though electrified in 1960 as part of the Glasgow North Bank suburban electrification scheme, it was closed to passenger in November 1979 when the Argyle Line reopened (the recommissioned station on this route at Bridgeton effectively replaced it). It was then used as a maintenance depot for the Class 303 and Class 311 fleet until final closure in June 1987. The tracks were subsequently lifted and platforms demolished. The station building, now in commercial and residential use, is protected as a category B listed building.

Preceding station	Historical railways	Following station
Terminus	Glasgow City and District Railway; North British Railway	Gallowgate Central; Line and Station closed
