= Bennie Railplane =

Electric propeller-based suspension railway

Coordinates: 55°55′55.2″N 4°18′57.7″W

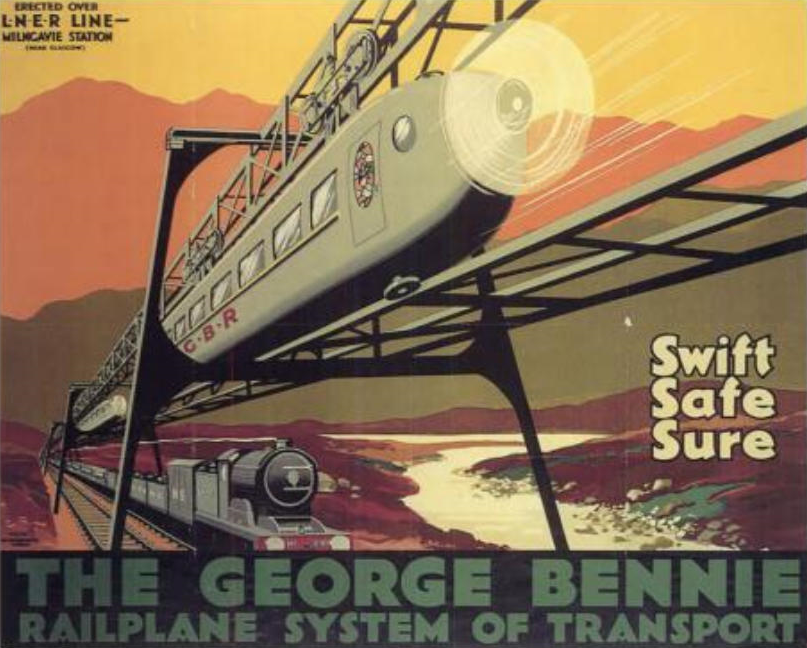

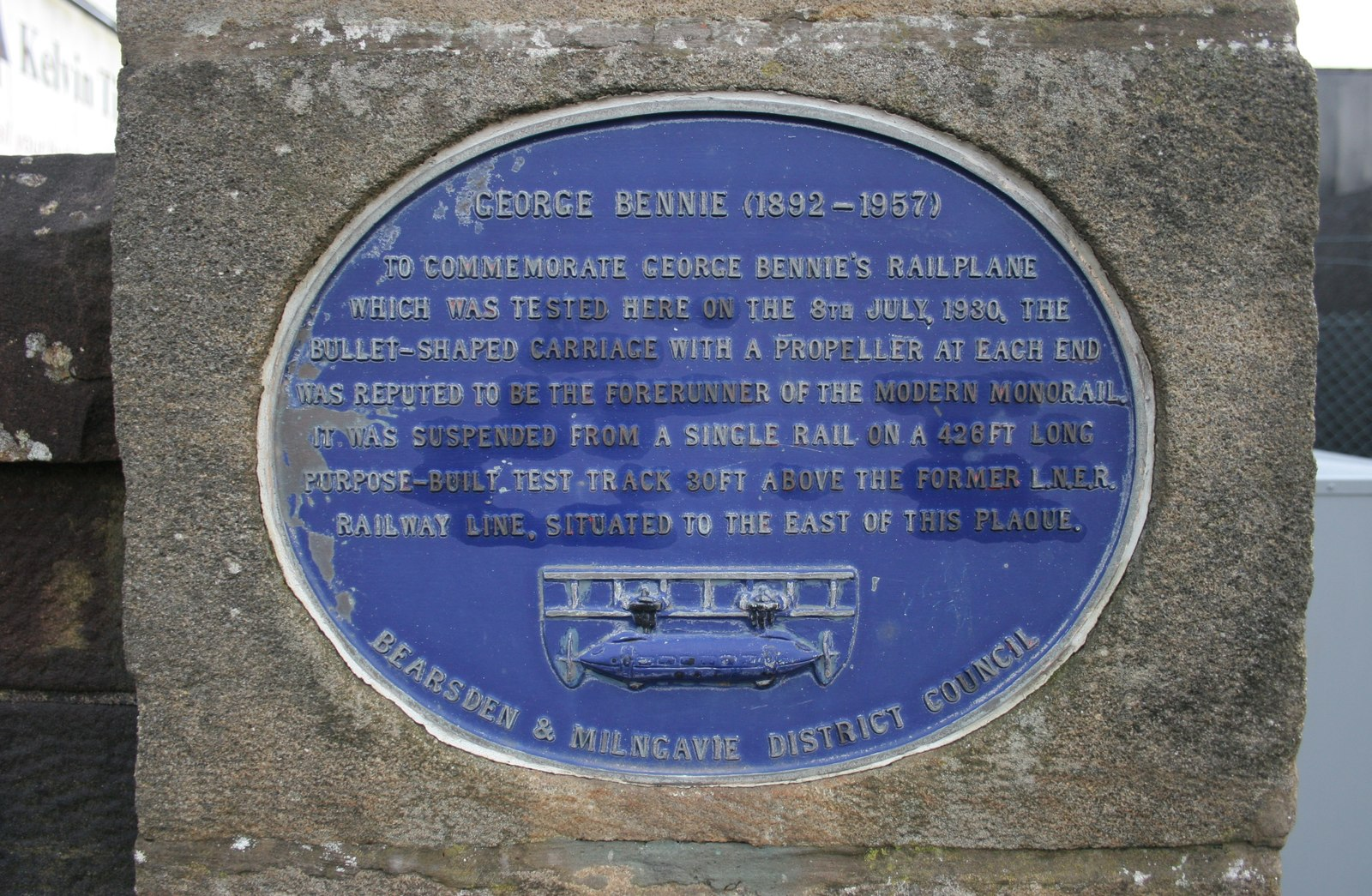
Blue Plaque commemorating George Bennie between Bearsden and Milngavie

The Bennie Railplane was a form of rail transport invented by George Bennie (1891–1957), which moved along an overhead rail by way of propellers.

== Prototype ==
Bennie, born at Auldhouse, near Glasgow, Scotland began work on the development of his railplane in 1921. In 1929-1930 he built a prototype on a trial stretch of track over a 130-yard (119-metre) line at Milngavie, off the Glasgow and Milngavie Junction Railway, with one railplane car to demonstrate the system to potential clients. The car ran along an overhead monorail, stabilised by guide rails below. It moved by propellers powered by on-board motors. It was intended to run above conventional railways, separating faster passenger traffic from slower freight traffic. Bennie believed his railplane cars had the capability of travelling up to 120 mph (193 km/h) and would offer a "fast passenger and mails and perishable goods service". Slow and heavy goods freight and local passenger services would continue on the traditional rail service below. Each car could carry a maximum of 48 people; the prototype had seating for fewer.

In spite of interest from around the world, Bennie could not obtain the financial backing he required to develop his revolutionary transport system. The proposed line from Edinburgh to Glasgow was not built, nor was the one between Southport and Blackpool. By 1937, Bennie was bankrupt. He had financed most of the work himself.

The prototype railplane lay rusting in a field at Milngavie until it was sold for scrap in 1956. Bennie died the following year. The original shed where the carriage was built in Main Street, Milngavie is now occupied by a timber merchant, and has a blue commemorative plaque on the outside wall.

== See also ==
- Wuppertal Suspension Railway
- Aérotrain
- Schienenzeppelin
- Suspension railway
