= Stobcross Railway =

Railway in Scotland

The Stobcross Railway was a railway line in Glasgow, Scotland, built by the North British Railway to connect from Maryhill to the new dock being built at Stobcross; the dock became the Queen's Dock, opened in 1877. The line was opened first, in 1874, and gave the North British company access to the north bank of the River Clyde; there was a goods depot at Partick.

As industry and housing developed further west the line became the stem of further branches, and in 1886 the sub-surface Glasgow City and District Railway connected through Queen Street Low Level to Stobcross.

Queen's Dock closed in 1969 and freight use of the line was minimal, but part of the line has been electrified and most of it is in use in 2015 for passenger trains.

== History ==
=== The Glasgow, Dumbarton and Helensburgh Railway ===
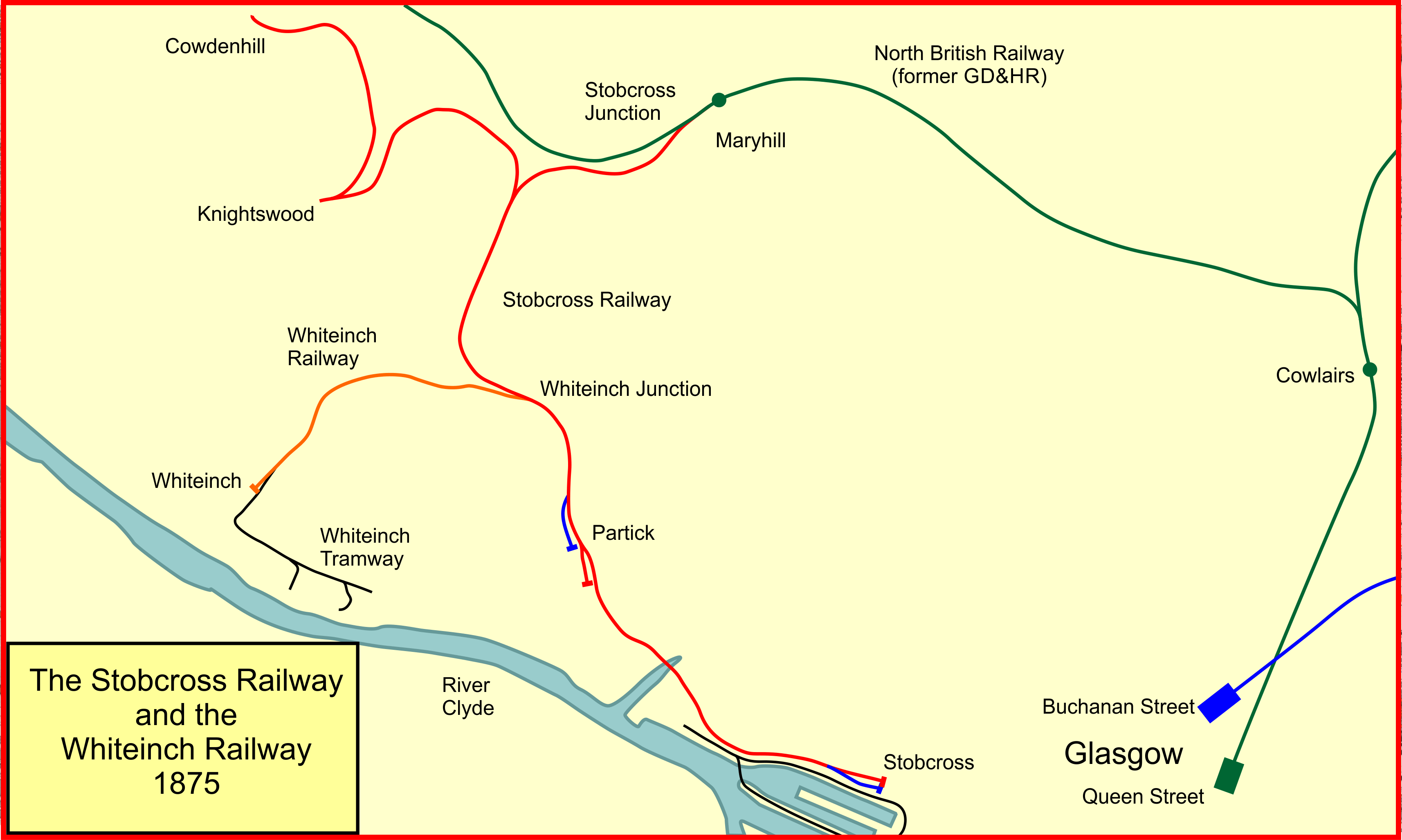
System map of the Stobcross Railway

The Glasgow, Dumbarton and Helensburgh Railway (GD&HR) was opened in 1858, running from the Edinburgh and Glasgow Railway (E&GR) at Cowlairs to Dumbarton where it joined an existing railway; together they served Balloch and Loch Lomond, and Helensburgh. The new line ran in a broad loop round the north of Glasgow and then westwards some distance north of the River Clyde. At the time the industry of Glasgow was concentrated in the central and eastern areas, and the shipping that came to the city berthed at Broomielaw; there was relatively little industrial and marine activity on Clydeside west of the city, and the GD&HR did not serve those areas.

The GD&HR was absorbed by the E&GR in 1862 and the E&GR was itself absorbed by the larger North British Railway (NBR) in 1865.

=== The Queen's Dock ===
As shipping activity increased, larger and more numerous vessels required to berth in Glasgow and it was obvious that they could not be accommodated in the central area. In 1872 the Clyde Commissioners started work on a new dock at Stobcross, on the north shore of the Clyde to the west of the city. The new dock was formally opened on 18 September 1877 by the Lord Provost of Glasgow, and he announced that by permission of Queen Victoria the new dock was to be known as The Queen's Dock.

The new facility was obviously going to make considerable changes to commodity flows in Glasgow, and the North British Railway set about constructing a branch line to serve the dock. The NBR obtained an authorising Act in 1869; it was amended in 1870 and 1871 for financial reasons. The line was to run from Maryhill on the GD&HR southwards, turning east past the Royal Lunatic Asylum (later converted and now Gartnavel Hospital), then running south-east through Partickhill to the dock. Even though the route avoided the main city area, considerable difficulty and expense arose from the necessary land acquisition.

The Forth and Clyde Canal was diverted over a length of 586 yards (535 m) and the route used for the new railway line.

The original estimate for the line had been £84,400 but £140,000 was spent on land acquisition and legal fees alone. In 1868 the NBR observed that there was little sign of the Stobcross being started, and introduced a Parliamentary Bill to abandon the line. However, in fact they did proceed with it.

Extensive siding accommodation was provided at Stobcross. The importance to the city of free rail access was such that the rival Caledonian Railway was granted running powers over the line by Parliament; the Caledonian got access to the NBR system from Sighthill via Springburn. The siding complex at Stobcross was 70 feet (21 m) above the level of the quayside lines and a steeply graded connecting line was built; the Caledonian got joint ownership of that short section. The G&SWR also applied for access but their line was to run west from Dunlop Street across St Enoch square, continuing along the bank of the Clyde, and this scheme was refused by Parliament.

=== The line opens ===
The Stobcross line opened on 20 October 1874, for goods and mineral traffic only. The route from the NBR line out of Queen Street was extremely circuitous, but for the time being any more direct routing was unthinkable. The NBR went to considerable lengths to make the exercise of the Caledonian Railway's running powers as inconvenient as possible; this included various forms of delay for supposed operational reasons, and the refusal to allow stabling of Caledonian locomotives at Stobcross, resulting in much wasteful light running. However the NBR and the Caledonian each had their own goods yard at Partick.

=== The Whiteinch estate ===
It was not just berthing of ships that was moving down river; by this time a small industrial complex had established at Whiteinch. Shipbuilding and joinery works were prominent. The area was rural and remote at the time, and the construction of the Stobcross line presented an obvious opportunity, and on 1 July 1872 (Note: Ross says 1 July 1873.) the Whiteinch Railway was authorised; at the same time the Whiteinch Tramway was authorised, which distributed wagons within the estate area. The Whiteinch Railway joined the Stobcross line near Crow Road; the junction was named Whiteinch Junction and the line opened on 29 October 1874. The Whiteinch Railway ran down as far as the Dumbarton Road, and the tramway operated an east-west distributor route south of the main road.

On 1 January 1897 (Note: Ross says 14 December 1896.) the Whiteinch Railway was made a passenger line, with a new connection with the Yoker line at Whiteinch West Junction; the passenger service finished on 2 April 1951. The branch was used as a depot for the electrification works trains when the North Side Electrification was in progress in the late 1950s.

=== Knightswood and Cowdenhill ===
There were numerous pits and quarries near Knightswood not far from the line. In 1875 a branch line from what became Knightswood South Junction was opened in a northerly arc to Jordanhill Brickworks, and the branch was extended back to the north later to reach Knightswood Brickworks and the Western Colliery at Cowdenhill. In later years the location of pits and factories changed and the configuration of this branch was changed accordingly.

=== Yoker and Clydebank ===
Just as Stobcross was a response to the westerly movement of the focus of industry, so that process continued, and from 1870 Clydebank became the centre of a complex of heavy industry. It too was not close to the original GD&HR line and the nominally independent Glasgow, Yoker and Clydebank Railway was opened on 1 December 1882 to serve it. The line ran west from Yoker Junction, just west of Whiteinch Junction, on a straight alignment just north of the Whiteinch line. There were passenger stations at Partick, Yoker and Clydebank. For the time being this was an isolated section; Stobcross was not a passenger station.

=== The Glasgow City and District Railway ===
During all this time, as heavy industry, shipbuilding and quay facilities were moving west, the NBR's North Clyde network continued to be accessed only from Cowlairs via Maryhill, a long way round. On 15 March 1886 the Glasgow City and District Railway opened. It was a subsurface line running east to west through the centre of Glasgow, from College in the east, through a new Low Level station at Queen Street, to Stobcross which was now on a through line instead of a dead end. The line proved immensely popular with passengers, and goods traffic could now be brought in by a shorter route. A short branch was opened on the same day from Partick Junction (on the original Stobcross line) to a terminus at Hyndland.

On 1 August 1886 a spur was opened from Knightswood South Junction to Knightswood North Junction, forming a south to west chord and enabling through running from the City and District line towards Milngavie and Dalmuir.

=== Clydebank to Dalmuir ===
Remote from the Stobcross branch, the missing link from Clydebank to Dalmuir was filled in 1897, from which time the NBR network was complete, with two linked routes from Queen Street High and Low Levels to Dalmuir and beyond, with the facility to cross over through Anniesland. At the same time the junction at Jordanhill was made into a triangle by the opening of the north to west chord there: "Partick West Chord".

=== The Caledonian Railway and its satellites ===
The North British Railway had established a commanding network serving increasing areas of residential development and heavy industry on the north side of the Clyde, based on the original Stobcross line of 1874. The rival Caledonian Railway still had the smallest of toeholds on the north bank, until in the years 1894 to 1896 the Lanarkshire and Dumbartonshire Railway opened, from the Caledonian main line east of Buchanan Street, arcing round in a similar northerly arc to the Stobcross line, then turning west to reach Dumbarton.

This was progress for the rival company, but it was not enough. In the years 1895 to 1896 the Glasgow Central Railway opened, running from Rutherglen on the main line out of Glasgow Central, to Stobcross and curving round to Maryhill. Now the Caledonian too had a direct line through the centre of the city offering convenient east-west transits for passengers. Stobcross and the Queen's Dock was now reached from the city by the Caledonian as well.

=== From 1923 ===
In 1923 the main line railways of Great Britain were "grouped" by the Railways Act 1921 into four large groups. The North British Railway was a constituent of the new London and North Eastern Railway (LNER) and the Caledonian Railway was a constituent of the new London Midland and Scottish Railway (LMS). For the time being the competition continued. In 1948 the Government once again reorganised the railways, this time taking them into state ownership, nationalisation. Both the North Clyde networks were now part of British Railways, Scottish Region. The train services continued much as before, but changing social patterns, the decline of heavy industries and the rise of efficient bus services, meant that the steam trains running through the city in poorly ventilated tunnels were increasingly unpopular.

A modernisation plan was developed in 1955, and this led to electrification of the passenger operation of most of the former NBR network. Most of the old Caledonian routes were to close to passengers. The new passenger service was inaugurated in 1960. The Hyndland branch of 1886 was closed to passengers (on 5 November 1960), and a depot for the new electric trains was created there, in use until 1989, when the depot at Yoker was opened.

The Caledonian Railway route to Rutherglen was closed in 1964. However it was revived when in 1979 the Argyle Line opened, using most of the earlier alignment from Stobcross eastwards.

The Queen's Dock had closed to maritime use in 1969, and from 1982 the area was regenerated by infilling the docks; the Scottish Exhibition and Conference Centre now stands on the site. The extensive sidings at Stobcross to serve the dock have all been removed and occupied by the Exhibition Centre and other developments.

The railway connection to the Queen's Dock was severed much earlier, in 1980, when Maryhill Park Junction signal box was burnt down, and the section of the original Stobcross Railway from Maryhill Park Junction to Knightswood South Junction was disconnected. There had been workers trains from Clydebank to Springburn over the route until 1959, and also empty passenger stock trains from Cowlairs to Queen Street Low Level for trains originating there.

The section of the Glasgow Dumbarton and Helensburgh Railway from Cowlairs to Maryhill had also been closed to local passenger trains since 1961, and only the through West Highland Line trains and goods traffic used it for many years.

However, from 1993 a new local passenger service has been resumed, from Glasgow Queen Street to Maryhill, and since 2005 it has been extended to Anniesland on the former Stobcross Railway. The physical junction at Maryhill Park Junction has been moved to the west of the River Kelvin viaduct. A typically 30-minute interval passenger service operates.

== Topography ==
The locations on the Stobcross Railway were:

- Maryhill Park Junction divergence from the GD&HR line;
- Knightswood South Junction; convergence of the line from Westerton;
- Great Western Road; opened 15 March 1886; renamed Anniesland 1931;
- Hyndland North Junction; divergence of west curve towards Yoker; also known as Partick North Junction, and Whiteinch North Junction;
- Hyndland East Junction; convergence of line from Yoker; also known as Partick East Junction, and Whiteinch East Junction;
- Hyndland; opened 7 November 1960;
  - Hyndland (first station); opened 15 March 1886; closed 7 November 1960;
- Hyndland Junction; convergence of line from Hyndland (first station); also known as Partick Junction;
- Partick; opened 1 December 1882; renamed Partickhill 1953; moved south of Dumbarton Road 17 December 1979 to co-locate with the Glasgow Subway station, and renamed Partick;
- Yorkhill; opened 2 February 1885; closed 1 January 1917; reopened 1 February 1919; closed 1 April 1921;
- Stobcross; not a NBR passenger station; goods station and connection to Queen's Dock, and later end-on junction with Glasgow City and District Railway and Glasgow Central Railway.

== The line today ==
Almost all of the route is still open as of September 2015: most of it forms part of the North Clyde Line electric commuter network and the remainder at the northern end is used by Maryhill Line DMU services between Maryhill and Anniesland. Network Rail began work in the summer of 2015 to reinstate the former Knightswood South Junction connection near Anniesland to allow through running once more between Hyndland & Partick and Maryhill via Kelvindale.

The only parts of the route that are no longer in use are the goods yards at Partickhill and the Queen's Dock and the old terminus station at Hyndland.
