= Glasgow, Dumbarton and Helensburgh Railway =

Railway in Scotland

Overview
- Locale: Scotland
- Dates of operation: 14 August 1855–31 July 1862
- Successor: Edinburgh and Glasgow Railway

Technical
- Track gauge: 4 ft 8 1/2 in (1,435 mm)

The Glasgow, Dumbarton and Helensburgh Railway was independently sponsored to build along the north of the River Clyde. It opened in 1858, joining with an earlier local line serving Balloch. Both were taken over by the powerful North British Railway in 1865, and for some time the line was the main route in the area. As industry developed other lines were opened to serve it, and the line formed the core of a network in the area.

The line was electrified as part of a modernisation scheme in 1960, and it continues today as the trunk of the North Clyde network west of Glasgow.

== History ==
=== Before authorisation ===
The communities of Dumbarton and Helensburgh were important staging points on the road from Glasgow to the western seaboard of Scotland, and were well served by small boats on the River Clyde.

Most of the first railways in Scotland were the coal railways, designed to convey coal or other minerals from a pit to a port or a canal for onward conveyance. Generally these lines used horse traction and were short.

In 1842 the Edinburgh and Glasgow Railway (E&GR) started its operations, and showed what an inter-city railway could do, carrying passengers and goods over a longer distance. Towns served by the new railway immediately felt the advantage, as the necessities of life, particularly coal and lime for farm use, became much cheaper, and the transport to market of locally manufactured goods was also immeasurably improved.

The notion of long-distance railways, and a network, took hold of the public imagination, and the easily available money of the 1840s led to a frenzy of Scottish railway promotion. Intrinsic in this was the question of how the cities of central Scotland might best be linked with the emerging English railway network. This culminated in the authorisation of a large number of Scottish lines in 1844 - 1845.

Those railways, notably the North British Railway, the Caledonian Railway and the Glasgow and South Western Railway, had their own priorities, which in most cases was to consolidate the area in which they were dominant. At first the north bank of the Clyde was left to the river boats.

In 1846 the Caledonian and Dumbartonshire Junction Railway (Note: The company chose the spelling Dumbartonshire; in the nineteenth century both spellings were common, although in the twentieth century the County administration was spelt Dunbartonshire.) (C&DJR) was authorised, to connect with the E&GR near Cowlairs and to build a railway to Balloch, on Loch Lomond; at the time the River Leven was the centre of a considerable industry in textile printing.

The C&DJR was unable to raise the capital necessary to build all of its line, and it had to content itself with building from Bowling through Dumbarton to Balloch, relying on Clyde steamers to close the gap to the city.

=== The Glasgow, Dumbarton and Helensburgh Railway ===
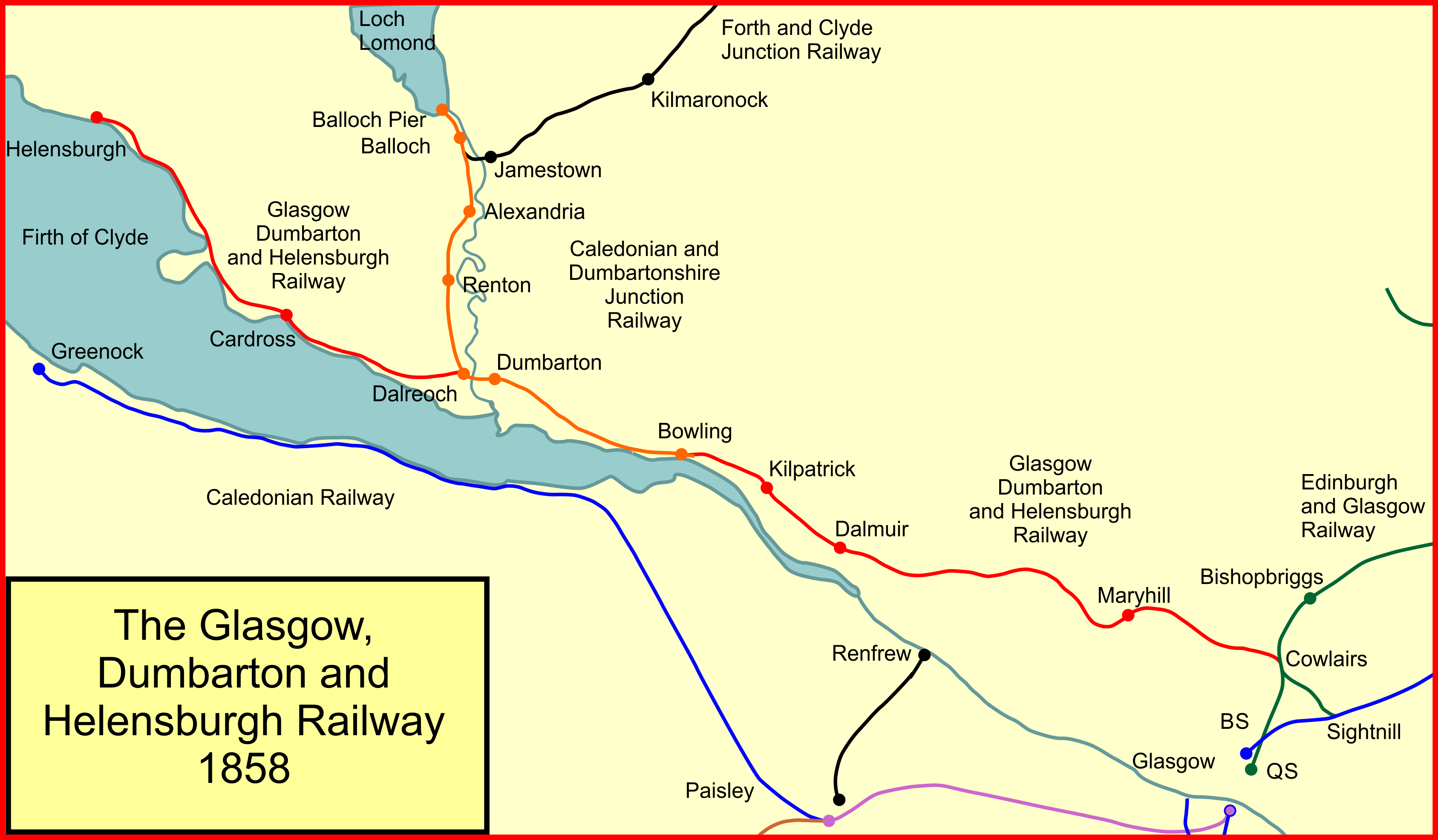
The Glasgow, Dumbarton and Helensburgh Railway system

The C&DJR line was remarkably successful, and that only emphasised the potential of a railway that truly connected the area north and west of Dumbarton with Glasgow.

Glasgow, Dumbarton and Helensburgh Railway Act 1855
- Act of Parliament
- Parliament of the United Kingdom
- Long title: An Act for making certain Railways to connect Glasgow, Dumbarton, and Helensburgh, in the Counties of Lanark and Dumbarton; and for making Provision for the Use and working of the said Railways.
- Citation: 18 & 19 Vict. c. cxc

Dates
- Royal assent: 14 August 1855

Text of statute as originally enacted

Local people promoted a railway to close the gap, and the Glasgow, Dumbarton and Helensburgh Railway was authorised by the Glasgow, Dumbarton and Helensburgh Railway Act 1855 (18 & 19 Vict. c. cxc) on 15 August 1855, to build a line from Cowlairs, on the Edinburgh and Glasgow line, to Helensburgh. Trains would use the Queen Street passenger terminus and Sighthill goods depot of the Edinburgh and Glasgow Railway. The authorised capital was £240,000.

The line was to link with the Caledonian and Dumbartonshire line and run over it in the centre of its route, and the Edinburgh and Glasgow Railway was to operate it. The planned line ran round the north of Glasgow, avoiding construction in the built up area. The directors were proud of their local support; much English capital had supported the construction of the earlier trunk railways of the 1840s, but those days were past.

The company agreed to repay the C&DJR company half of the cost of the River Leven bridge at Dumbarton.

=== Opening ===
When the construction was nearly complete, a disagreement with the Edinburgh and Glasgow Railway arose over the terms of using the Queen Street station. Instead of using that company's terminal facilities, on opening day the GD&HR trains ran to the Caledonian Railway Buchanan Street station from Sighthill. The opening took place on 28 May 1858. However a month later agreement emerged with the E&GR and the more convenient arrangement of running to Queen Street resulted from 30 May 1858.

The line west of Dumbarton was single, with spartan accommodation at the stations.

The GD&HR was working collaboratively with the C&DJR and most trains, passenger and goods, divided at Dumbarton, with a portion continuing to Helensburgh (GD&HR) and Balloch (C&DJR). Steamer operators had run from Glasgow to Bowling Pier for the onward connection over the C&DJR; that was now futile because of the through railway route, and many of them switched to operating throughout from Glasgow to Dumbarton and River Leven destinations in direct competition with the railway; they had to reduce their fares drastically in view of the speed disadvantage they suffered.

The GD&HR had intended to operate onward steamer connections from Helensburgh to the Clyde Estuary locations in 1858, but they discovered that the Caledonian Railway, established at Greenock on the south bank, had chartered all the available vessels and were monopolising the service from their own side of the river. The GD&HR had to wait until the following season to start a serious train-and-steamer operation.

They also suffered a rebuff in Helensburgh, where the pier was some distance from the railway station; attempts to obtain agreement to a railway connection to the pier were consistently resisted by the people of Helensburgh.

=== Absorption ===
As the line was operated by the Edinburgh and Glasgow Railway, the question arose of selling the line to that company; the C&DJR was in the same position. The absorption took place on 14 August 1862 when the GD&HR and the C&DJR ceased to exist: the line was owned by the E&GR.

The E&GR itself did not have a long independent existence after that date; the North British Railway was becoming more powerful and absorbed the E&GR on 31 July 1865.

The NBR was conducting a competitive war against the rival Caledonian Railway, and it immediately established a steamer service from Frisky Wharf (the C&DJ pier at Bowling) and Greenock, gaining a foothold there in Caledonian territory.

=== Steamer connections ===
The North British had a subsidiary, the North British Steam Packet Company, which operated steamer connections to Firth of Clyde piers. The services from Helensburgh were not greatly successful, and it was clear that the Helensburgh pier was unsatisfactory in the absence of a direct railway link. On 15 May 1882 a new pier was built at Craigendoran, a mile or so east of Helensburgh, and a short railway spur there gave a direct connection. Only from that year was the NBR able to operate a successful steamer connection to Rothesay and the other important Clyde locations. The town of Helensburgh contested the establishment of the Craigendoran pier, fearing the loss of trade at their pier, even though they had refused a railway connection to it. Indeed, they defeated the first Bill in Parliament, and the NBR had to resubmit a Bill in the 1879 session; the cost was to be £35,000. (It actually cost £50,000.) The NBR acquired an additional steamer, Sheila, to supplement Dandy Dinmont and Gareloch.

The line had previously run dead straight approaching Helensburgh (approximately along the alignment of the present day Marmion Avenue and Monaebrook Place) but to accommodate the Craigendoran Pier station adjacent to the through line, a new southerly sweep was introduced and the old straight route abandoned. The garden of no. 2 Marmion Avenue contains an original stone arch bridge over the Drumfork Burn.

In the year 1896 it was reported that Greenock to Glasgow commuters were being encouraged to cross the Clyde by steamer to Craigendoran, and to travel to Glasgow from there by the NBR trains.

=== Glasgow routes ===
The GD&HR route had always been reached from Glasgow by a roundabout route: the line left Queen Street in a north-easterly direction and arched round the north of the city to run west to Dumbarton and Helensburgh. The line was not planned as a suburban railway; in fact the first station on leaving Glasgow was Maryhill, then an isolated rural town, followed by Dalmuir.

The town of Milngavie was home to considerable industrial activity, especially in the field of textiles and paper making, and the independent Glasgow and Milngavie Junction Railway was opened in 1863. It connected to the GD&HR line at Milngavie Junction; it was not until 1913 that a station was opened at the junction: it was Westerton. The Glasgow and Milngavie Junction Railway was absorbed by the NBR in 1873.

Responding to the shortcomings of quay facilities in Glasgow, the Clyde Trustees undertook an ambitious project from 1871 to build a large dock at Stobcross, on marshland on the north bank downstream. This became the Queen's Dock, and it opened in 1874.

The North British Railway wished to access these new industrial developments, and foreseeing the demand for mineral transport in connection with the construction of the Queen's Dock, built a connecting line to it, the Stobcross Railway, leaving the GD&HR line at Maryhill and running south and then east. It opened on 20 October 1870, and it formed an important goods artery for NBR. In 1874 the short Whiteinch Railway was opened, leaving the Stobcross line near Jordanhill, and running to an area of industrial development on the Clyde.

The pattern of developing heavy industry to the west of the city was increasing, to satisfy the demand for more spacious sites and easy access to the Clyde for river transport. For shipbuilding purposes, access to a wider section of the Clyde was important as the vessels being produced were larger in size than in the past. The area that became known as Clydebank became the centre of considerable heavy industry development from 1871. In 1882 the Glasgow, Yoker and Clydebank Railway opened to serve those area. It left the Stobcross and Whiteinch lines near Jordanhill and ran west close to the Clyde, to a terminus at Clydebank.

The NBR now had a network of lines in the developing suburbs west of Glasgow, but the long circuit to reach the Queen Street terminus was a deterrent, and it was not until the Glasgow City and District Railway opened in 1886 that a direct route was available. The GC&DR was a sub-surface route running east to west through the centre of Glasgow, connecting in to the NBR lines and forming a direct run towards Dumbarton.

A short branch to Ruchill was opened in 1886; it ran from the GD&HR route at Possilpark Junction; a considerable industrial complex had arisen at Ruchill, on the east side of the Forth and Clyde Canal.

=== The Dumbarton and Balloch Joint Railway ===
For many years the North British Railway had an effective monopoly of nearly all of the North Clyde coast west of Glasgow. As industrial and residential development became ever more important in the area, the rival Caledonian Railway sought to enter into the area, and it encouraged a nominally independent company to promote a line. This became the Lanarkshire and Dumbartonshire Railway (L&DR). (Note: Like the Caledonian and Dumbartonshire Junction Railway, the Dumbarton and Balloch Joint Railway also used the spelling Dumbartonshire.) It proposed to build from the Caledonian system in Glasgow to a pier on Loch Lomond, tapping the important steamer trade to Lomondside piers, and also the textile industry locations in the valley of the River Leven. The new line would have closely paralleled the existing NBR lines, and especially in the narrow Leven valley this was seen as objectionable. A compromise was reached by which the L&DR would build only as far as Dumbarton and the line from there to Balloch would be made joint between the NBR, the LD&R, and the Caledonian Railway. (The Caledonian Railway worked the L&DR line, and absorbed it on 1 August 1909.)

This took effect from 1 October 1896; the junction was made some distance east of Dumbarton station. NBR and Caledonian trains both ran from Balloch Pier to Glasgow, but the onward route from Dalreoch to Helensburgh remained NBR property, so that NBR trains from Glasgow to Helensburgh ran over the D&BJR line in the central part of their journey. The D&BJR paid the NBR part of the capital cost of building that part of the line, but the NBR now had to pay tolls to the joint company for its trains' passage over the joint section.

=== The West Highland Railway ===
Up until this time the GD&HR route and the associated branches had formed a developing outer suburban network of the North British Railway. In 1894 the West Highland Railway opened its main line to Fort William. The main line passenger and goods trains used the GD&HR route between Glasgow and Craigendoran Junction, where the West Highland line diverged. It had its own station in Helensburgh, named Helensburgh Upper, and its own platforms at Craigendoran.

Considering the expansion of traffic, the line between Dalreoch and Cardross was doubled in 1894.

=== The Singer factory ===
The American Singer Corporation had opened a British factory from 1867 in Dunbartonshire, manufacturing sewing machines for the British market. The factory grew considerably and in 1883 a new plant was opened adjacent to the Kilbowie station of the GD&HR line. It had extensive internal sidings, and considerable numbers of workers travelled daily from elsewhere by train to their work.

In 1907 the factory needed once more to expand, and this was achieved by displacing the railway northwards. Part of the earlier line was retained and the original Kilbowie station retained as a private terminal station, Singers Works, for Singer employees, and a heavy workers' passenger service used the station.

A new station was built further north on the relocated GD&HR main line and renamed Singer, and the name is retained to the present day.

=== The twentieth century ===
The main line railways of Great Britain were "grouped" under the Railways Act 1921 into four larger entities in 1923; the North British Railway was a constituent of the new London and North Eastern Railway (LNER). The Caledonian Railway was a constituent of the new London Midland and Scottish Railway (LMS) so that the joint line was still under joint ownership.

In 1948 further reorganisation was imposed by Government, when the railways were nationalised. The LNER and the LMS now both formed part of the Scottish Region of British Railways. For the time being the former train service patterns continued, even though the former NBR route and the Caledonian route were under the same management. However both routes were run down, and the post war surge of better public transport by bus, and the rise in private car ownership, coupled with the beginning of the decline of the heavy industries on Clydeside, meant that change was inevitable.

A modernisation plan for the railways was developed; a route from Glasgow to Dumbarton and Helensburgh was to be electrified, but the duplicate routes could not be sustained. The former NBR route was selected for electrification, and this was inaugurated on 5 November 1960. The Caledonian line approaching Dumbarton served an important shipyard in Dumbarton, and also extensive housing that was not on the NBR line, so a connection was made at Dunglass, near Bowling, and the new electric trains ran over the former Caledonian route from there to Dumbarton Junction; that section of the NBR was closed.

The electric service was not trouble-free, for on 30 October 1960, a transformer explosion in an electric train took place in Glasgow, followed on 13 December by a serious explosion in a train at Renton, and the electric service was suspended. Steam trains resumed while modifications were made to the electrical equipment in the trains, which resumed on 1 October 1961.

The ordinary running of steam trains from Balloch on the L&DR route to Glasgow continued until 1964.

For some years a commuter service was operated from Arrochar & Tarbet on the West Highland line to Craigendoran. Passengers bound for Glasgow changed at Craigendoran. In the westbound direction the Arrochar train started in the Pier station and ran east to the junction, reversing there to continue its journey. The service ceased in 1964. Craigendoran Pier was closed in 1972 after a collapse in steamer usage.

=== Balloch stations ===
There were two stations at Balloch. Balloch Pier was on Loch Lomond and in the nineteenth century it was the scene of considerable transfer traffic from steamers to trains. After 1950 that traffic declined heavily, and in later years there was no timetabled passenger service, although the line remained available for excursion traffic. The last passenger trains operated in September 1986.

Balloch station, serving the town, was renamed Balloch Central in 1962. When the Pier station was due to be closed, it was decided to relocate the Balloch station south of Balloch Road to eliminate use of the level crossing. This was done on 29 September 1986, and the station was once again named simply Balloch.

=== Local station reopening ===
After the opening of the Glasgow City and District Railway in 1886, most passenger trains ran through the low level lines at Queen Street, and the northwards loop from Westerton to Cowlairs became a low priority for local trains, although the West Highland trains and goods traffic ran that way.

In 1993 a new local passenger service was started, using new and reopened stations on the northern loop. A thirty-minute interval service operates on the line between Glasgow Queen Street and Anniesland.

== The present day ==
In 2015, the dominant service pattern on the former GD&HR route consists of half-hourly trains from Helensburgh to Glasgow Queen Street (continuing to Edinburgh) and half-hourly trains from Balloch to Glasgow Queen Street, continuing to Airdrie. The Helensburgh trains omit many intermediate stops and make the journey to Queen Street in 47 minutes. In addition, the West Highland line trains travel over the route, as does the 1993 local service.

== Topography ==
When it opened, the GD&HR consisted of a line from Cowlairs Junction to Bowling, with stations at Maryhill, Dalmuir, and Kilpatrick, and a section from Dalreoch to Helensburgh, with stations at Cardross and Helensburgh.

The later location list is:

- Cowlairs East and West Junctions on the Glasgow to Falkirk main line;
- Cowlairs North Junction; the western apex of the triangle;
- Ashfield; opened 3 December 1993;
- Possilpark; opened February 1885; closed 1 January 1917, but continued in use for workmen to 2 March 1964; reopened as Possilpark & Parkhouse 3 December 1993 (slightly relocated);
- Possilpark Junction; divergence of Ruchill branch;
- Lambhill; opened 3 December 1993; renamed Gilshochill 1998;
- Summerston; opened 1 October 1879; closed 2 April 1951; reopened 3 December 1997;
- Maryhill East Junction; trailing junction for Kelvin Valley Line;
- Maryhill; opened 31 May 1858; closed 2 April 1951; reopened as Maryhill Park 19 December 1960; closed to public but continued in use for workmen 2 October 1961; closed completely 2 March 1964; reopened as Maryhill 3 December 1993;
- Maryhill Park Junction; Stobcross line diverged here;
- Knightswood; North Junction; Glasgow City and District line trailed in;
- Westerton; opened 1 August 1913;
- Milngavie Junction; facing junction for Milngavie line;
- Drumchapel; opened May 1890;
- Drumry; opened 6 April 1953;
- Singer East Junction; start of deviation for Singer Works expansion, and facing junction to Singer Workers Platform, opened after 1942 on a line into the Singer complex, closed 8 May 1967;
- Kilbowie; opened May 1879 on original main line; closed 4 November 1907, replaced by Singer station on deviation;
- Singer; opened 4 November 1907 on new deviation line;
- Singer West Junction; western access from Singer work;
- Dalmuir; opened 31 May 1858; relocated westwards 17 May 1897; sometimes known as Dalmuir Junction or Dalmuir Park;
- Dalmuir Park Junction; convergence of Yoker line;
- Kilpatrick; opened 31 May 1858;
- Bowling; opened by Caledonian and Dumbartonshire Junction Railway 15 July 1850; relocated 31 May 1858 for GD&HR;
- Bowling connection to former Caledonian and Dumbartonshire Junction Railway;
- Dunglass; site of 1960 connection to L&DR (former Caledonian Railway) route; line closed from here to Dumbarton Junction; present-day trains use the L&DR route;
- Dumbarton Junction convergence with L&DR route;
- Dumbarton; opened by Caledonian and Dumbartonshire Junction Railway 15 July 1850; upgraded station opened 31 May 1858 for GD&HR; renamed Dumbarton Central 1952; sometimes known as Dumbarton Joint station or Dumbarton Junction;
- Dalreoch; divergence of Balloch line; opened May 1852;
- Cardross; opened 31 May 1858;
- Craigendoran Junction; divergence of West Highland line and of Craigendoran Pier station;
- Craigendoran; opened 15 May 1882;
  - Craigendoran Pier; platforms adjacent to main line station;
- Helensburgh; opened 31 May 1858; renamed Helensburgh Central 1953.

== Sources ==
- Awdry, Christopher (1990). Encyclopaedia of British Railway Companies. Sparkford: Patrick Stephens Ltd. ISBN 1-8526-0049-7. OCLC 19514063. CN 8983.
- Butt, R. V. J. (October 1995). The Directory of Railway Stations: details every public and private passenger station, halt, platform and stopping place, past and present (1st ed.). Sparkford: Patrick Stephens Ltd. ISBN 978-1-85260-508-7. OCLC 60251199. OL 11956311M.
- Jowett, Alan (March 1989). Jowett's Railway Atlas of Great Britain and Ireland: From Pre-Grouping to the Present Day (1st ed.). Sparkford: Patrick Stephens Ltd. ISBN 978-1-85260-086-0. OCLC 22311137.
