= Glasgow, Yoker and Clydebank Railway =

Railway line in Scotland

The Glasgow, Yoker and Clydebank Railway was a railway company that opened in 1882, giving a rail connection to shipyards and other industry that developed in what became Clydebank. At first it was a purely local line, connecting only at Stobcross with the North British Railway, but as industry developed in the area it served it became increasingly important.

It was built from a junction near the present-day Jordanhill railway station to a terminus at Clydebank, and in 1897 it was extended to Dalmuir.

Most of the route is still in use as the Yoker section of the North Clyde suburban network.

== History ==
=== North Clyde railways ===
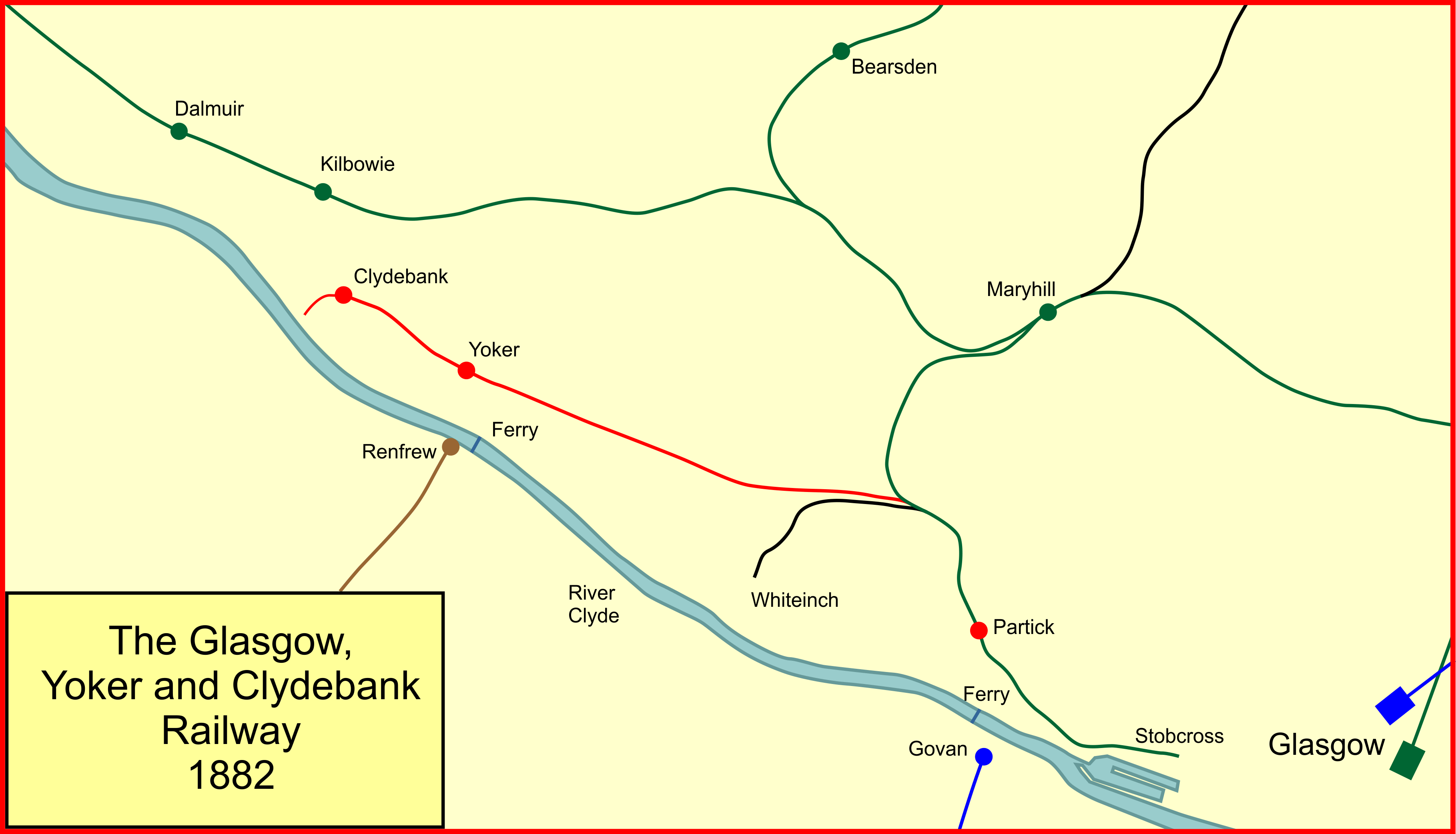
The Glasgow, Yoker and Clydebank Railway in 1882

In 1858 the Glasgow, Dumbarton and Helensburgh Railway opened, forming the first railway connection from the city to the north bank of the Clyde. However the line ran a considerable distance from the river until it reached Bowling, and the intervening area was for the time being undeveloped.

At the time, industry was concentrated in the city and the berthing of ships took place at the Broomielaw. Larger berthing facilities were needed, and the Clyde Commissioners constructed a new dock at Stobcross; it opened in 1877, and was called The Queen's Dock. By this time the North British Railway (NBR) had taken over the Glasgow, Dumbarton and Helensburgh Railway, and the NBR built a line to the dock. The Stobcross Railway opened in 1874, for goods and mineral traffic only. The Stobcross line ran in a wide sweep round the north of Glasgow through Maryhill, then a remote rural town, and then south and south-east through Partick, where there was a goods station.

Also in 1874 the Whiteinch Railway opened; this was also a goods-only railway, running from the Stobcross line south to a Whiteinch goods station on the Dumbarton Road. This was built to support a small enclave of industry that had built up in the area, which was otherwise remote.

=== Clydebank ===
In July 1872 the Clyde Trustees evicted the Govan shipyard of J & G Thomson, and the company established a new yard downstream on the other bank at what became Clydebank. The shipyard workers of course all lived locally to Govan, and the company conveyed them to and from their place of work in an old steamer, the Vulcan. Heavy materials too were brought in by steamer. Over the succeeding years other industrial premises opened nearby, also using the river as their transport medium. J & G Thomson promoted the idea of a railway, at first to be called the Glasgow, Yoker and Dalmuir Railway, but the Forth and Cart Canal, a branch of the Forth and Clyde Canal proved awkward, and the idea was cut back to reach Clydebank only.

=== Glasgow, Yoker and Clydebank ===
Glasgow, Yoker, and Clydebank Railway Act 1878
- Act of Parliament
- Parliament of the United Kingdom
- Long title: An Act for making a Railway from the Stobeross Railway to Yoker and Clydebank, with branches therefrom; and for other purposes.
- Citation: 41 & 42 Vict. c. cl

Dates
- Royal assent: 4 July 1878

Text of statute as originally enacted

On 4 July 1878 the Glasgow, Yoker and Clydebank Railway obtained its authorising act of Parliament, the Glasgow, Yoker, and Clydebank Railway Act 1878 (41 & 42 Vict. c. cl), (Note: Carter, Paterson; Ross says "in 1877" on page 124.) to build a line connecting the Clydebank site with the Stobcross Railway. Local industrialists who would benefit from the line subscribed £65,000, and the remaining £17,500 was put forward by the North British Railway.

The railways herein-before referred to and authorised by this Act are:—
- First. A railway (herein-after called railway No. 1), 3 miles 2 furlongs 5·60 chains in length, commencing in the parish of Govan, in the county of Lanark, by a junction with the Stobcross Railway of the North British Railway Company, and terminating in the parish of Old Kilpatrick, in the county of Dumbarton, at a point seventy-five yards or thereabouts northward from the northmost corner of the farm-steading of West Barns of Clyde, in the occupation of Robert Paterson:
- Second. A railway (No. 4), 9·45 chains in length, commencing by a junction with railway No. 1, at a point thereon three hundred and twenty-five yards or thereabouts north-westward from the north-west corner of the toll-house at Yoker, and terminating in a field in the occupation of William Brock, at a point three hundred and eighty-two yards or thereabouts eastward from the eastmost corner of the farm-steading of East Barns of Clyde, in the occupation of the said. William Brock:
- Third. A railway (No. 5), 8·80 chains in length, commencing by a junction with railway No. 1, at a point thereon ninety-seven yards or thereabouts north-eastward from the northmost corner of the said farm-steading of West Barns of Clyde, and terminating in land in the occupation of Messrs. James and George Thomson, at a point one hundred and ten yards or thereabouts north-westward from the northmost corner of the said last-mentioned farm-steading.
— Section 5, Glasgow, Yoker, and Clydebank Railway Act 1878 (41 & 42 Vict. c. cl)

The railway opened as a single line on 1 December 1882, with stations at Partick (on the Stobcross line) and Yoker. Partick could be reached by the Govan Ferry, and the Yoker station was not far from the Renfrew ferry. Goods traffic was of course significant, and the passenger service was not connected to the rest of the railway network for the time being; there was no passenger station at Stobcross. The passenger trains were not run at suitable times for the workers at first, and they continued to use the steamer. The line was worked by the North British Railway.

The construction appears to have exceeded its estimated cost, for in 1888 debentures were redeemed by a preference share issue at a face value of £28,241.

=== Singer sewing machines ===
A year after the opening of the Clydebank line, the Singer Manufacturing Company opened the plant that became their sewing machine factory adjacent to Kilbowie, on the GD&HR line nearby. This plant grew immensely, and encouraged other industries to set up in the area, so that Clydebank in general, served by both lines, became an important industrial complex.

=== Glasgow City and District Railway ===
The North British Railway network had suffered from the circuitous connection from Queen Street passenger terminal and College goods station to get access to the north Clyde lines, and in 1886 a great improvement was made when the Glasgow City and District Railway opened. This ran east to west through the city as a sub-surface line, connecting with the original Stobcross Railway end on; a new passenger station named Finnieston was provided there. This transformed the access for suburban passenger trains but also for goods and mineral traffic which could now run direct from Sighthill.

=== A rival line ===
The Caledonian Railway had long felt that it was losing out in its poor access to the north bank of the Clyde, and it encouraged the construction of the Lanarkshire and Dumbartonshire Railway (the company used the variant spelling of Dumbartonshire). This opened in 1896, running generally closer to the Clyde than the North British lines, and giving more convenient access for goods and passenger purposes to many of the industrial sites. The North British managed to get a clause inserted into the L&DR Act restraining that company from opposing a westward extension of the GY&CR.

=== Extending the GY&C line ===
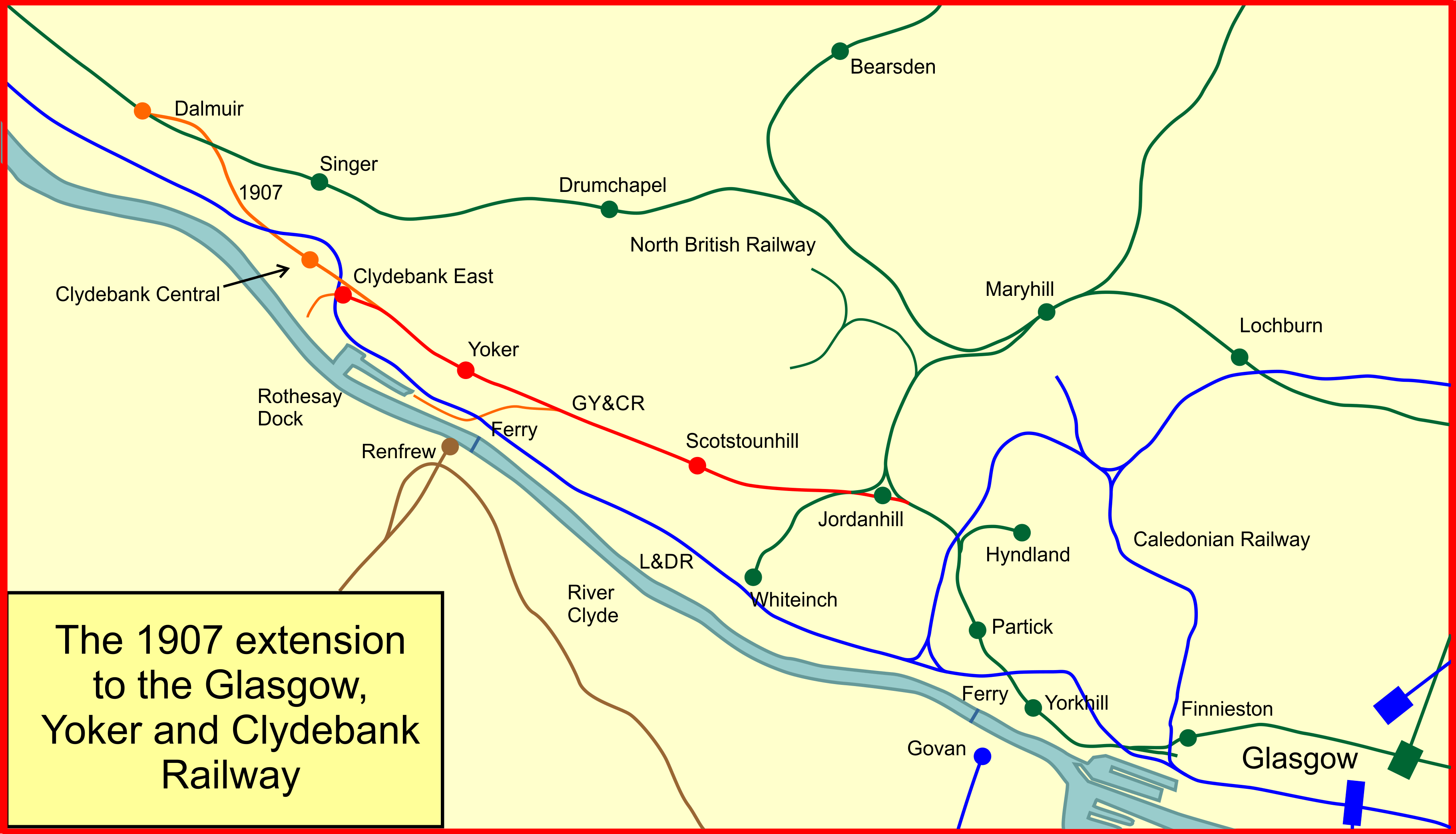
The Glasgow, Yoker and Clydebank Railway in 1907

The limited potential of the GY&C line proved to be a problem, and encouraged by the NBR, the GY&CR tried to get approval for a line onwards to Dalmuir, but in 1892 this was turned down by Parliament.

Glasgow, Yoker, and Clydebank Railway Act 1893
- Act of Parliament
- Parliament of the United Kingdom
- Long title: An Act to authorise the Glasgow Yoker and Clydebank Railway Company to extend their Railway to Dalmuir and to double their existing main line and for other purposes.
- Citation: 56 & 57 Vict. c. clxxiv

Dates
- Royal assent: 27 July 1893

However, the Glasgow, Yoker, and Clydebank Railway Act 1893 (56 & 57 Vict. c. clxxiv) was obtained authorising doubling of the single line and extension from Clydebank to Dalmuir. The GY&CR was still independent but this work was carried out collaboratively with the NBR, which guaranteed the GY&CR 6% on capital. (Note: Ross says "with an adjusted guarantee from the NBR to the Glasgow, Yoker and Clydebank Railway of 6% on capital". Presumably this means a guaranteed income of that sum.) The extension started a little to the east of the Clydebank terminus, which was therefore left on a dead end section. A new Clydebank station was opened on Kilbowie Road, and this station was known as Clydebank Central. The old terminus was renamed Clydebank East and continued to be the terminus for some suburban passenger trains. At Dalmuir the extension converged with the GD&HR line, now owned by the NBR. The point of convergence was to the west of the existing Dalmuir station, which was near Park Road. The GY&CR line passed under the GD&HTR line and a new Dalmuir station with platforms on both lines was opened at Duntocher Road.

The doubling of the original GY&CR was completed on 13 December 1896, and the extension opened on 8 May 1897 for goods and mineral trains and on 17 May 1897. the through line was an instant success with passengers. the old terminus continued to be used as an end point for some suburban trains, and also as a starting and finishing point for excursions, until 1959.

The GY&CR was absorbed by the North British Railway on 15 July 1897 under the North British Railway (General Powers) Act 1897 (60 & 61 Vict. c. cxxvii).

=== The Jordanhill Loop and Rothesay Dock ===
The pressure to provide expanded quay facilities for larger vessels continued, and the Clyde Commissioners opened the new Rothesay Dock (Note: It was opened by the Prince of Wales, Duke of Rothesay, later to be King George V.) near Clydebank on 25 April 1907. Just as with the Queen's Dock, it was essential to provide rail access to it, and it lay alongside the GY&CR line, from which the connection was provided. A considerable volume of freight traffic was foreseen, and a connection at Jordanhill was provided to give direct access from Clydebank towards Maryhill.

At the area close to the present-day Jordanhill station, the Stobcross Railway had run from north to east on a tight curve, passing the hospital grounds. When the GY&CR line opened, that ran directly west from the Stobcross line, at Yoker Junction. A north to west curve, the Jordanhill Loop, forming a triangle, was constructed, giving the required direct access from the Yoker line towards the Maryhill direction.

=== From 1923 ===
In 1923 the main line railways of Great Britain were "grouped" by the Railways Act 1921 into four large units; the North British Railway was a "constituent" of the new London and North Eastern Railway (LNER). By now the GY&CR line was fully integrated into the passenger and goods network on the north bank of the Clyde.

The railways were then nationalised in 1948, the Scottish lines forming part of British Railways Scottish Region.

The L&DR line was now in the same management unit, and as social patterns changed and some heavy industry declined, the need for two competing networks along the Clyde was called into question. In fact the NBR network was designated for modernisation under a plan of 1955; the modernisation in fact became a scheme to electrify the passenger train operation, and this became effective in 1960. Most of the L&DR section closed, although a number of short sections were retained to give continued access to industrial sites.

The Rothesay Dock line was closed in the 1960s, but it was reopened when imported coal was brought to the dock in the early 1980s. Traffic ceased again in 1988 and the line has since been removed.

Clydebank East, the original Clydebank terminus, closed in 1959, but in the final decade the terminus was the originating point of "Starlight Specials" which were overnight services to London at cheap fares.

The remainder of the GY&CR line continues in heavy use today as part of the Glasgow suburban network.

In 1987 a passenger train maintenance depot was constructed at Yoker, together with a signalling centre, in a site formerly occupied by goods sidings, south of the line.

== Topography ==
The locations on the line were:

- Yoker Junction;
- Scotstounhill; opened July 1883;
- Garscadden; opened 7 November 1960;
- Clydebank Dock Junction; divergence of line to Rothesay Dock;
- Yoker; opened 1 December 1882;
- Clydebank Junction;
  - Clydebank; terminus; opened 1 December 1882; renamed Clydebank East 17 May 1897 when by-passing line to Dalmuir opened; closed 14 September 1959;
- Clydebank Central; opened 17 May 1897; closed 1 January 1917; reopened 2 June 1919; renamed Clydebank 1965;
- Dalmuir; opened 17 May 1897 with platforms on the GY&CR and the GD&HR lines, replacing an earlier station some distance to the east on GD&HR line.

== Sources ==
- Awdry, Christopher (1990). Encyclopaedia of British Railway Companies. Sparkford: Patrick Stephens Ltd. ISBN 1-8526-0049-7. OCLC 19514063. CN 8983.
- Jowett, Alan (March 1989). Jowett's Railway Atlas of Great Britain and Ireland: From Pre-Grouping to the Present Day (1st ed.). Sparkford: Patrick Stephens Ltd. ISBN 978-1-85260-086-0. OCLC 22311137.
