= Whiteinch Victoria Park railway station =

Former railway station in Scotland

Coordinates: 55.8773°N 4.3414°W

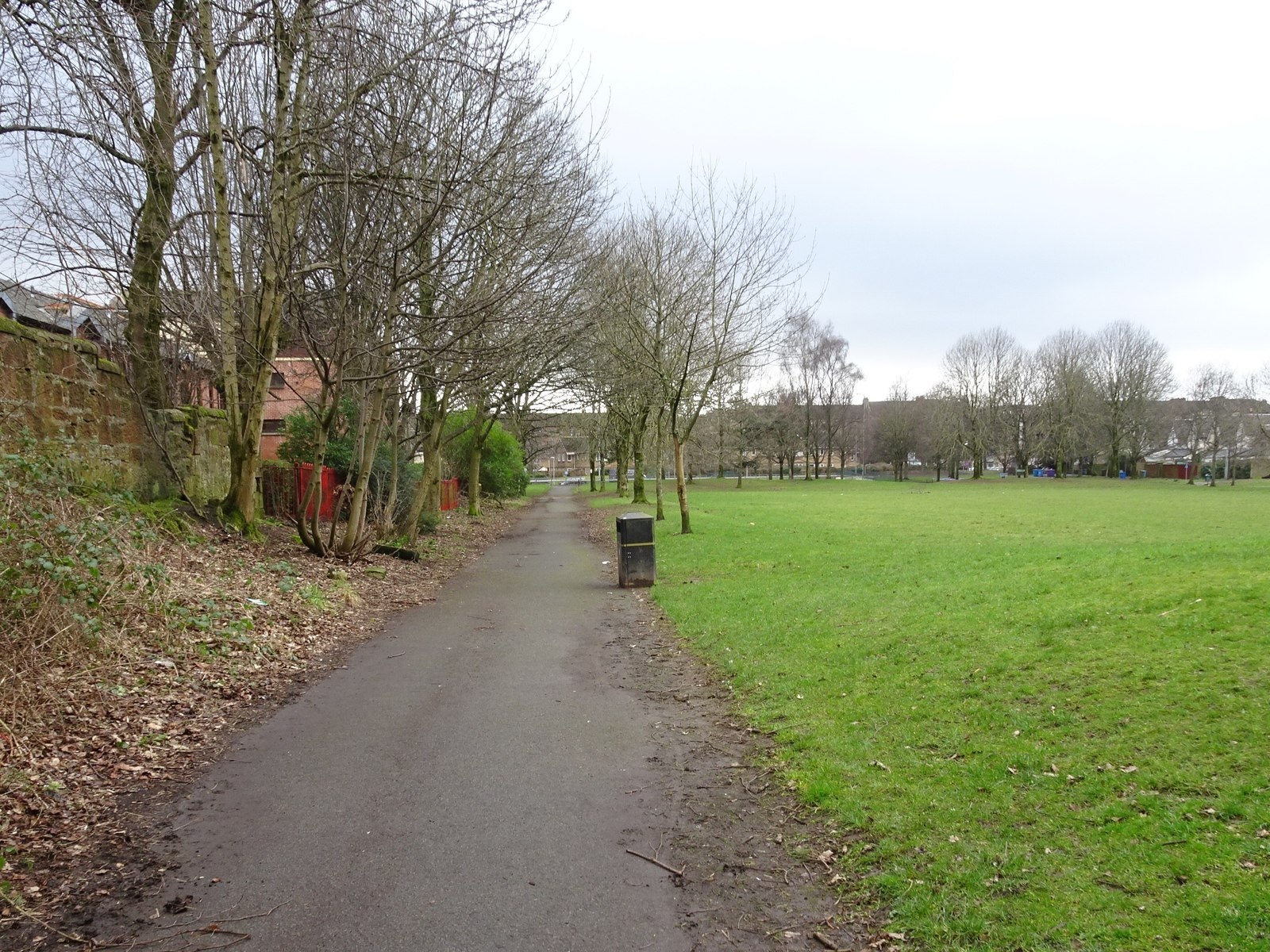
The site of the station in 2019

Whiteinch Victoria Park railway station was a suburban railway station serving Whiteinch in Glasgow, Scotland. It was opened as a goods station known as Whiteinch in 1874 as part of the newly constructed Whiteinch Railway. In 1897, the station was rebuilt as Whiteinch Victoria Park, with services running to Jordanhill railway station.

Passenger services were suspended from 1 January 1917 until 2 June 1919. Final closure of the passenger service was terminated in 1951. It remained in use for goods and as a depot during the electrification of other routes in the area, finally closing in 1967.
