= Glasgow and Milngavie Junction Railway =

Railway line in Scotland

Overview
- Dates of operation: 1 August 1861–28 July 1873
- Successor: North British Railway

Technical
- Track gauge: 1,435 mm (4 ft 8 1/2 in)

The Glasgow and Milngavie Junction Railway was a short locally promoted branch line built to connect the industrial town of Milngavie with the main line railway network, near Glasgow, Scotland. It opened in 1863.

The town, and Bearsden, an intermediate location on the line, became significant residential centres, and nowadays the line is a part of the Glasgow commuter network. No freight is handled on the line.

The inventor George Bennie developed the Bennie Railplane, a system of overhead express passenger railways, and he built a demonstration section above a dormant industrial siding that branched from the line. However Bennie was unable to attract investment to implement his scheme, and the demonstration track was dismantled in 1956.

== History ==
=== An independent railway ===
Glasgow and Milngavie Junction Railway Act 1861
- Act of Parliament
- Parliament of the United Kingdom
- Long title: An Act for making a Railway from the Glasgow, Dumbarton, and Helensburgh Railway to Milngavie, and for other Purposes.
- Citation: 24 & 25 Vict. c. cxcviii

Dates
- Royal assent: 1 August 1861

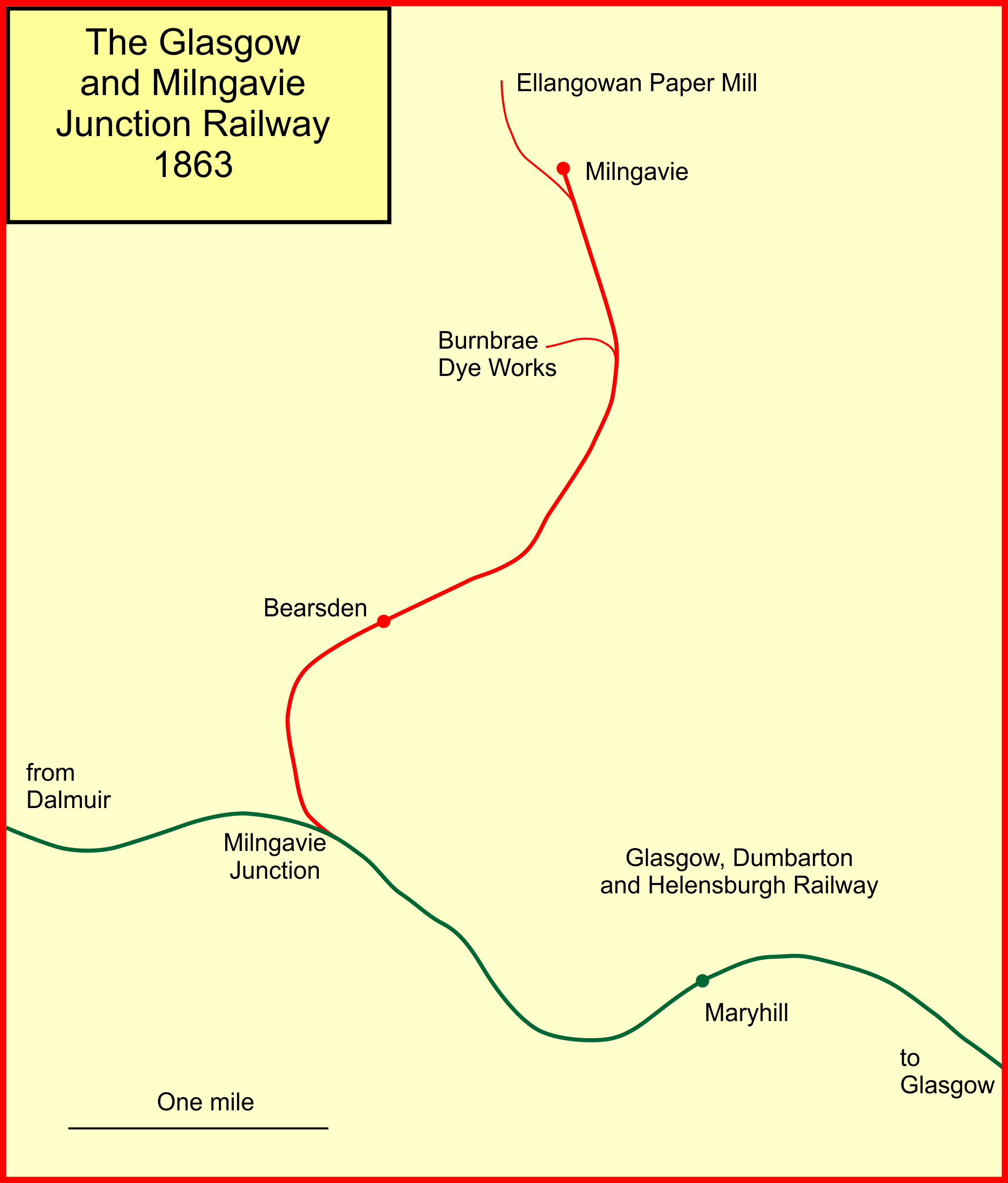
System map of the Milngavie Railway

On 28 May 1858 the Glasgow, Dumbarton and Helensburgh Railway opened its line, running from Cowlairs, where it joined the Edinburgh and Glasgow Railway a short distance north of its Queen Street terminus.

Milngavie was a rural town with considerable industry, especially in the textile printing and papermaking trades. The GD&HR was the first railway in the area north west of Glasgow, but the benefits of railway connection, in reducing the cost of commodities like coal and agricultural supplies, and in facilitating transport of manufactured goods to market, were plain to see elsewhere. Seeing that the GD&HR passed not far from their town, businesspeople in Milngavie determined to promote a branch line to make the connection. They obtained the Glasgow and Milngavie Junction Railway Act 1861 (24 & 25 Vict. c. cxcviii) authorising the Glasgow and Milngavie Junction Railway on 1 August 1861; the capital was £30,000. (Note: Awdry says (page 132) that the act was procured by the GD&HR. It is difficult to see what he means by this, and it is not supported by contemporary sources.)

Although the district was lightly populated, high class residential travel was developing in similar situations elsewhere, and was expected to be a positive factor for the Milngavie line.

The line was just over 3 miles (5 km) long and construction was not difficult; the line opened on 28 April 1863. (Note: According to Paterson, Smith and Quick; Carter and Awdry give 21 April 1863; Ross gives 20 April 1863 (page 59).) Like the GD&HR, it was worked by the Edinburgh and Glasgow Railway for 50% of gross receipts. (Note: Paterson says it was worked by the NBR, but the NBR had no locus in the area until 1865.) There was one intermediate station at Bearsden.

South of Milngavie a short branch led to the Burnbrae Dye Works, and at Milngavie a long siding extended past the station to Ellangowan Paper Mills. There were a considerable number of goods sidings at Milngavie.

=== Absorbed by the NBR ===
On 28 July 1873 the North British Railway Act 1873 (36 & 37 Vict. c. ccix) was passed, authorising the takeover of the Milngavie line by the NBR. The line became simply a part of the growing North Clyde network of the NBR.

=== The twentieth century ===
The line had been constructed as a single line; it was doubled on 24 April 1900. Hillfoot station was opened at the same time.

The North British Railway became a constituent of the new London and North Eastern Railway in 1923, following the Railways Act 1921; in 1948 the railways were nationalised and the line was under the control of British Railways, Scottish Region.

=== The Bennie Railplane ===
The inventor George Bennie developed a system known as the Bennie Railplane; it adopted some features of the 1901 Schwebebahn in Wuppertal, Germany, the Wuppertal Suspension Railway.

It was a lightweight single vehicle suspended from an overhead track; the track was supported on gantries. The intention was that fast through passenger trains could be run above traditional railways, segregating them from slower traffic without an additional land take. The Burnbrae Dye Works branch had closed in 1926 and Bennie built a short demonstration section of his line above it. Publicity photographs taken at the time show a goods train below the Bennie vehicle, but the goods train was placed there for the photography, and was not actually in revenue service. (However the journalists and others were taken to the track's "station" by passenger train on the Dye Works branch.)

A demonstration run for the press was arranged for 4 July 1930. The vehicle was electrically powered, driving a propeller, the only electrically powered airscrew driven suspended monorail ever to be built. The vehicle made use of lightweight Duralumin in the structure and cladding of the Railplane, a material that, "to the best of [the author's] knowledge, had never previously been used structurally in railway carriage or public service vehicle design". The demonstration track was 426 feet (130 m) long. Bennie attracted much attention for his scheme, and was a skilful publicist. However the system was not adopted in any practical application. Available documentation does not explain how junctions and crossovers were to be dealt with, and approaches to established railway managements in the UK and elsewhere resulted in the view that the system would abstract from, and not complement, the existing railway. Some free-standing routes were considered, particularly to airports, but were never proceeded with. Bennie was declared bankrupt in 1937.

The railplane and its track were scrapped in 1956.

As of 2015 the shed where the vehicle was stored is in use by Kelvin Timber (West) Ltd adjacent to Main Street, Milngavie; a blue plaque commemorating the trial is fixed to the wall at the point where the Burnbrae dyeworks branch, and the test track, crossed.

=== Electrification ===
The Milngavie branch (as the line had become) was electrified as part of the North Clyde modernisation scheme in 1960. There are no goods facilities on the line now. The line was partly singled under the Yoker Area Resignalling in 1990.

== Current operations ==
As of 2016 passenger services operate as part of the Argyle Line group of services to/from Motherwell, Cumbernauld and Larkhall, typically on a 30-minute interval, operated by ScotRail. Monday to Saturday daytimes also see a half-hourly service over the North Clyde Line to/from Edinburgh Waverley via Glasgow Queen Street Low Level and Airdrie.

== Topography ==
Locations are:

- Milngavie;
- Hillfoot; opened 1 May 1900;
- Bearsden;
- Westerton Junction; convergence with line from Helensburgh; originally known as Milngavie Junction.

The line from Milngavie to Hillfoot and from Bearsden to Westerton Junction is single line.
