= Whiteinch Railway =

Former railway line in Scotland

The Whiteinch Railway was a railway line opened in 1874 in Scotland to connect industrial premises that had developed in the area with the Stobcross Railway, giving access to the main line network. It was opened for goods and mineral traffic, and was extended by the Whiteinch Tramway which fed directly into the factories and works.

The Whiteinch Railway was taken over by the North British Railway in 1891 and they started a passenger service on the line in 1897; the terminus was called Whiteinch (Victoria Park).

After 1945 passenger and freight usage of the lines declined, and the passenger service was discontinued in 1951. The Whiteinch goods yard was later used as a construction depot for the electrification of the North Clyde passenger services, but the lines were closed completely in 1967 and nothing remains of them.

== History ==
=== Before the Whiteinch Railway ===
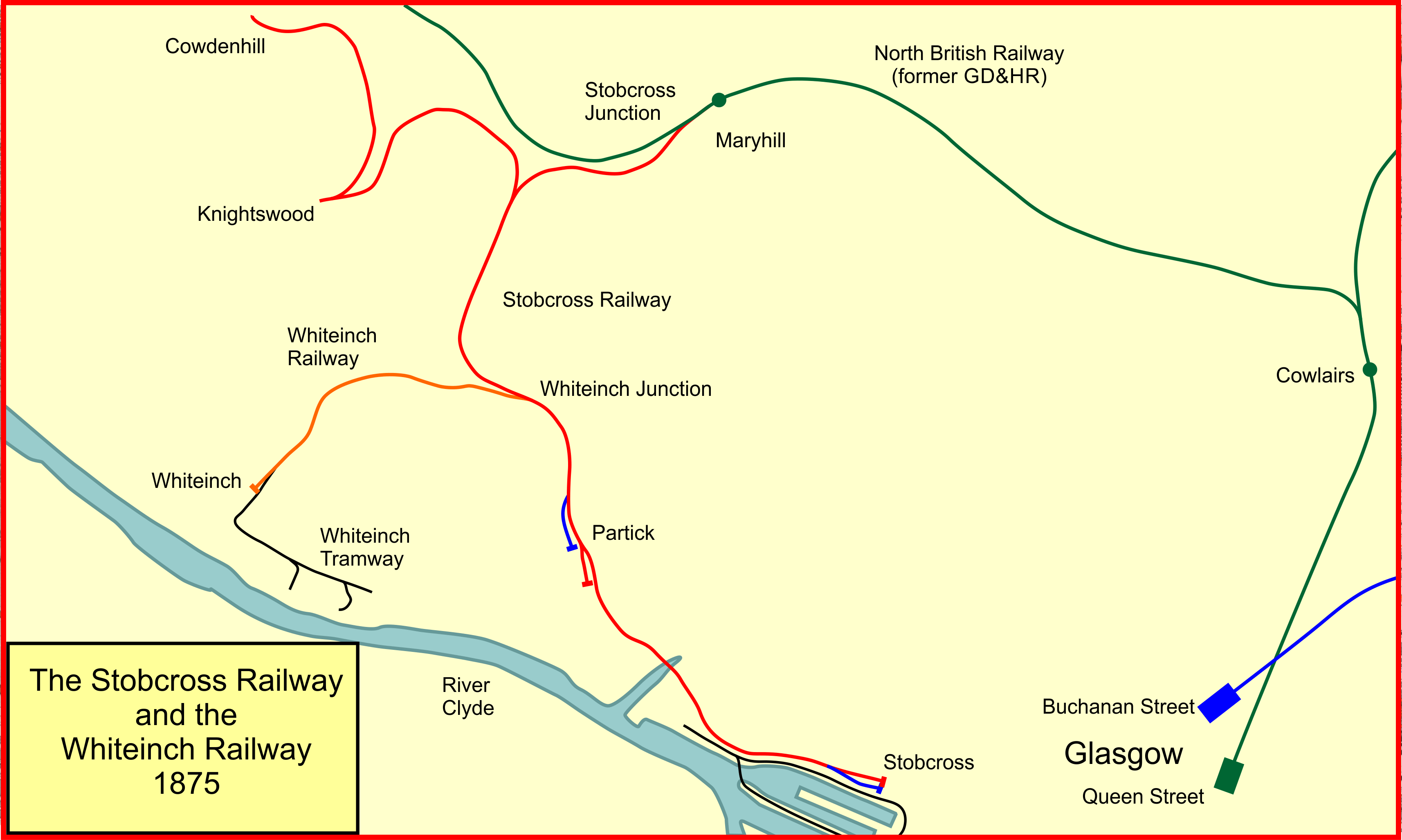
System map of the Whiteinch Railway and the Stobcross Railway

The first railways in Glasgow were located on the east side of the city, and were concerned with transporting minerals. In 1832 the Garnkirk and Glasgow Railway opened to a terminus at Townhead, bringing coal from the Monklands coalfield to the city. The Polloc and Govan Railway was an 1840 development of an earlier waggonway, improved to get access to shipping on the south bank of the Clyde at Broomielaw (a name then applied to the area both sides of the river). In 1842 the Edinburgh and Glasgow Railway opened its intercity line to Edinburgh.

The north bank of the Clyde was not developed for some time, and railway access was difficult. The main lines built at the end of the decade ran east and south, and although construction through, and under, the central area was proposed, opposition was so strong that it was not carried out. The Glasgow, Dumbarton and Helensburgh Railway (GD&HR) was opened in 1858, but it ran in a broad northern sweep round the city, through Maryhill (then a remote small town) and did not approach the Clyde until it reached Bowling.

=== The Queen's Dock ===
Heavy industry expanded in subsequent years and there was pressure to move west of the city where land was available and access to the Clyde was easier. At the same time, berthing of ships in Broomielaw was becoming difficult as shipping volumes, and vessel sizes, increased, and the Clyde Commissioners determined to build a new dock on the north bank west of the city. Work was started in 1872 at Stobcross, and the new dock, to be known as "The Queen's Dock" was formally opened on 18 September 1877.

=== The Stobcross Railway ===
By this time the GD&HR had been taken over by the North British Railway. The creation of the new dock was obviously of fundamental concern to the company, and it secured Parliamentary authority for a line to Stobcross to serve the dock. The line, known as the Stobcross Railway, branched from the GD&HR at Maryhill (Stobcross Junction), and it opened on 20 October 1874.

=== Whiteinch ===
Some industrial development had taken place in about 1870 at Whiteinch, a mile or so west of Stobcross, on the north bank of the Clyde. There was no rail access to the sites and the promotion of the Stobcross line encouraged the idea of providing a line. The Whiteinch Railway was proposed and obtained its authorising Act on 1 July 1872. (Note: Ross says 1 July 1873.) It was to connect at a new Whiteinch Junction and run west and then south to a goods yard ("Whiteinch Goods and Mineral Station") on the north side of Dumbarton Road. Whiteinch Junction was located about halfway between the present-day Hyndland and Jordanhill stations, opposite the end of Woodcroft Avenue. The course of the line was dictated by the contours. The construction was partly funded by local industrialists and landowners, all of whom had an interest in the benefits of the line. It opened on 29 October 1874.

The Whiteinch Tramway was authorised on the same date as the Whiteinch Railway, and became operational on the same day as the railway. It ran from the Whiteinch goods depot and crossed Dumbarton Road, then turning east along what became South Street (but at the time simply through fields) to serve the industrial premises. The tramway was horse operated, wagons being worked to and from the railway yard. The tramway was worked by James and William Wood who traded as merchants in coal, sand and iron products, using the tramway as a subsidiary part of their business. The traffic was sufficient to enable the purchase of a locomotive in 1875.

=== The Glasgow, Yoker and Clydebank Railway ===
In 1882 the Glasgow, Yoker and Clydebank Railway opened. It left the Stobcross Railway at Yoker Junction, a little to the west of Whiteinch Junction, and ran west from there just to the north of the first section of the Whiteinch Railway. (Yoker Junction later became the eastern apex of the triangle at Jordanhill.)

=== Passenger traffic ===
The North British Railway worked the Whiteinch Railway, and it aspired to incorporate it and the tramway into its own system. This was resisted locally, until in 1891 the NBR agreed a purchase of the Whiteinch Railway, but not the tramway. In due course the NBR converted the Whiteinch Railway into a passenger branch, and next to Whiteinch goods yard they built Whiteinch Victoria Park passenger station. It opened on 1 January 1897, there were no intermediate stations on the short branch.

=== The Lanarkshire and Dumbartonshire Railway ===
In 1896 the Lanarkshire and Dumbartonshire Railway (L&DR) (the company name used the variant spelling of Dumbartonshire) opened its line; it was sponsored by the rival Caledonian Railway and ran along the north bank of the River Clyde, giving a much improved service to industrial premises than the Wood Brothers' tramway. The finances of the tramway declined and in May 1914 the Wood Brothers went into liquidation. A and G Anderson took over the local management of the line, but the North British Railway stepped in and the railway operations were effectively controlled by them, with Anderson handling the merchant activity. In 1916 the NBR took over the working of the tramway completely.

=== Closed to passengers ===
Passenger services were suspended from 1 January 1917 until 2 June 1919. After World War II social patterns changed and at the same time road transport, for goods and for passengers, had improved significantly and on 2 April 1951 the passenger service to Whiteinch was withdrawn. Goods traffic continued until closure in March 1965.

The North Clyde passenger train network was electrified in 1960 and the construction work in connection with it had been carried out over several preceding years. An electrification depot was established in Whiteinch goods yard for the purpose. The depot continued as a maintenance depot until 1967.

== The line today ==
The whole of the Whiteinch Railway and the Whiteinch Tramway has been closed and Whiteinch goods yard has been landscaped and is open ground; the Dumbarton Road frontage is now occupied by residential accommodation.

== Connections to other railways ==
- Stobcross Railway at Whiteinch Junction.
- Glasgow, Yoker and Clydebank Railway at Yoker Junction.
