= Glasgow City and District Railway =

Subsurface rail line in Glasgow City, Scotland

The Glasgow City and District Railway was a sub-surface railway line in Glasgow, Scotland, built to connect suburban routes east and west of the city, and to relieve congestion at the Queen Street terminus.

Construction of the cut-and-cover route, only the fourth such in Great Britain, was formidably complex, but the line opened in 1886. It was steam operated, leading to complaints about smoky conditions. It had a four-platform low level station at Queen Street, and was heavily used.

The line was electrified in 1960 and today forms the central part of the North Clyde electric railway network.

== History ==
=== Earlier railways ===
The first railways in the west of Scotland were the coal railways, intended primarily to bring coal to the city for consumption, and to canals and ports for onward water-borne transport. The Garnkirk and Glasgow Railway opened in 1831 and had a terminus at Townhead, on the north-eastern margin of the city.

In 1840 more general-purpose railways were seen: the Glasgow, Paisley, Kilmarnock and Ayr Railway opened in 1840, followed by the Glasgow, Paisley and Greenock Railway in 1841, and the Edinburgh and Glasgow Railway (E&GR), providing an intercity service, in 1842. It had a passenger and goods station at Queen Street in Glasgow. It was not until 1848 that the first long-distance line reached the city: the Caledonian Railway opened to Glasgow.

There were now four passenger terminals in Glasgow, at Bridge Street, at South Side, at Buchanan Street and at Queen Street. Some short lines to small towns with an industrial base were opened, and these encouraged residential development: the beginning of daily travel to work by train; but there was no suburban network.

=== West and east of Glasgow ===
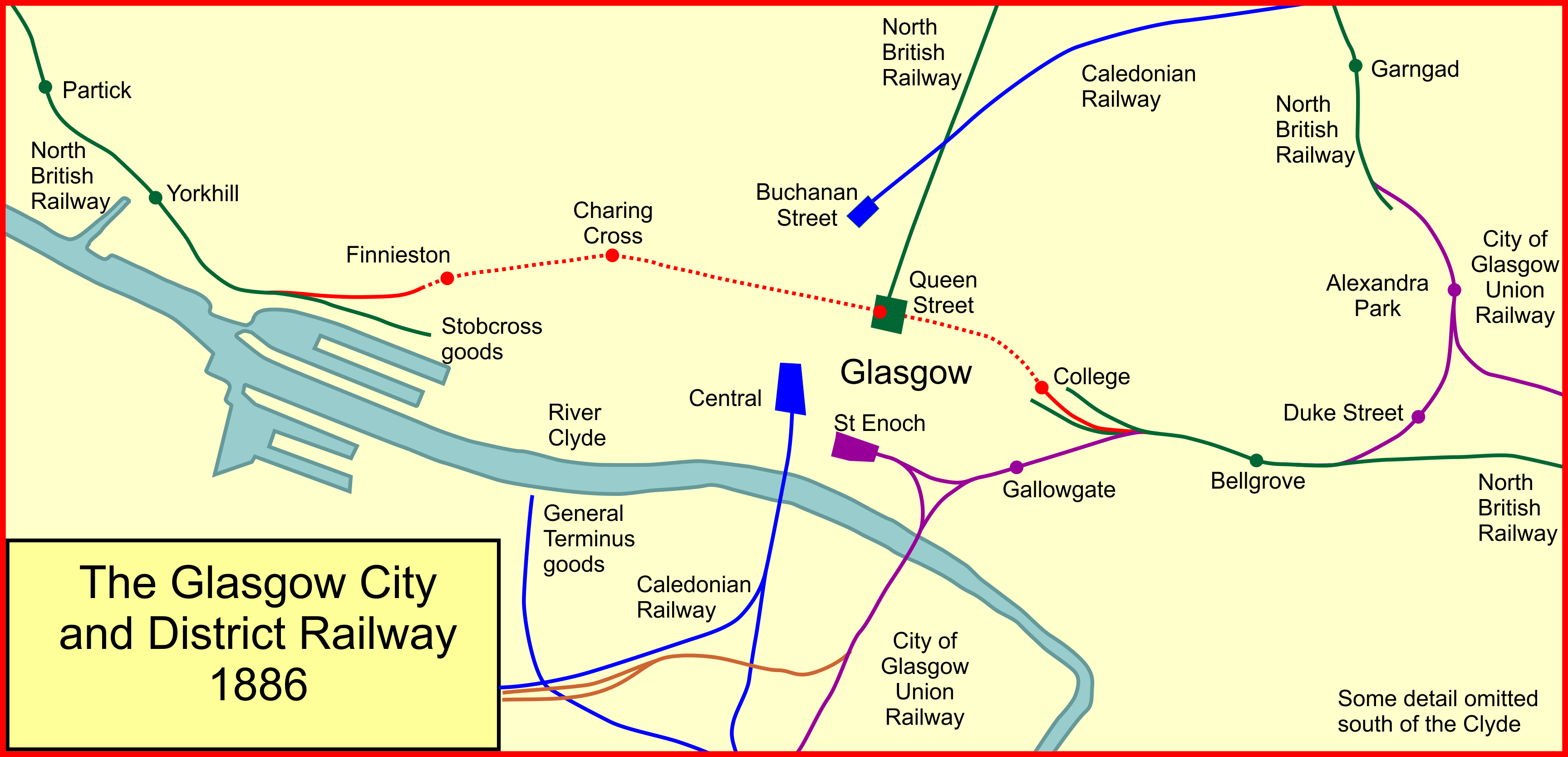
System map of the Glasgow City and District Railway

For many years passenger and goods trade between Glasgow and communities and industries west of Glasgow was carried on by boat. The north bank of the Clyde was relatively unpopulated as far as Bowling, where the basin of the Forth and Clyde Canal entered the river; beyond that Dumbarton was a centre of industry; and beyond Dumbarton lay the towns of the Firth of Clyde.

In 1858 the Glasgow, Dumbarton and Helensburgh Railway (GD&HR) was opened, connecting the city to a purely local railway that connected Bowling and Balloch, on Loch Lomond. Now at last the north bank of the Clyde had a through railway connection. However the built-up area of Glasgow prevented the GD&HR from building directly west from the city, and its line made a large circuit round the north of Glasgow. There was still no attempt at a suburban service: the first station from Glasgow was Maryhill, then an isolated village, and then Dalmuir.

The GD&HR joined with the Edinburgh and Glasgow Railway at Cowlairs, and was absorbed by that company in 1862; the E&GR was itself absorbed by the North British Railway (NBR) in 1865.

On the east side, the Monklands area around Airdrie and Coatbridge had become the centre of the iron industries; it had extensive seams of good quality coal and of blackband ironstone. The wealthy industrial district was in the area served by the Caledonian Railway and the North British Railway sought to build a direct line to Coatbridge from Glasgow, to participate in the available business. It opened its Coatbridge branch in 1871. The Glasgow terminus was called College, at a site vacated for the purpose by the University of Glasgow; it was not convenient for the city centre. The NBR had collaborated with the Glasgow and South Western Railway (G&SWR) in the construction of the City of Glasgow Union Railway, which also opened to College in 1871, crossing the River Clyde and linking the G&SWR network with the NBR line.

At last the separate radiating railways around Glasgow were becoming linked, and a suburban passenger railway, and the exchange of goods traffic, could be thought of.

The NBR network now developed west of the city, driven chiefly by the expansion westwards of heavy industry and of docking facilities for steamers. The Stobcross Railway opened in 1874 to serve the new Queen's Dock at Stobcross, but this line too made a large circuit of the city to reach the dock. The Glasgow, Yoker and Clydebank Railway was opened in 1882 to serve a shipyard and other industrial sites that were relocating. The passenger service on the Yoker line was not connected to the rest of the railway network.

=== A line through the centre of the city ===
This fractured set of lines frustrated the development of the areas served by the NBR. Moreover, Queen Street station, which was considered cramped from the outset, was now impossibly congested with terminating trains and a goods station, and there was no possibility of increasing line capacity on the Cowlairs incline. The NBR set about the task of connecting the lines east and west of the city.

Glasgow City and District Railway Act 1882
- Act of Parliament
- Parliament of the United Kingdom
- Long title: An Act for making Railways from the Stobcross Branch of the North British Railway to the Glasgow and Coatbridge Branch and the Helensburgh Branch of that Railway, and for other purposes.
- Citation: 45 & 46 Vict. c. ccxvi

Dates
- Royal assent: 10 August 1882

Text of statute as originally enacted

The Glasgow City and District Railway (GC&DR), an independent company sponsored by the NBR, was authorised by the Glasgow City and District Railway Act 1882 (45 & 46 Vict. c. ccxvi) on 10 August 1882 to make a line from the College station to Stobcross, a distance of 3 miles (5 km). The capital was to be £550,000. A connection at Knightswood enabling through running from Stobcross towards Dalmuir was included in the authorisation.

The main section of the GC&DR was to be sub-surface, constructed by cut and cover. At its peak the construction had 22 tunnelling faces active. A four-platform station was to be provided at Queen Street, partly under the existing main line station. A new through station was to be provided at College, replacing the existing terminus. The Stobcross line at the west end was a goods-only dead end and this was to be transformed into a through line, with a station nearby at Finnieston.

The construction was challenging in engineering terms: it was only the fourth underground line in the country.

=== Opening ===
The GC&DR line opened on 15 March 1886, and the company was amalgamated with the North British Railway. The passenger services that had previously run to Queen Street high level terminus were diverted to run through the new line, providing immediate relief at Queen Street. On the same day the NBR opened the short Hyndland branch from Partick Junction, providing a western terminus for some trains. (Note: Thomas explains on page 142 that the NBR decided unilaterally that the Hyndland branch would be made as part of the GC&DR construction.) On 1 August 1886 the Knightswood spur opened, and Queen Street goods depot was closed and the goods traffic transferred temporarily to the G&SWR goods station at College. Goods trains were not allowed to use the underground section, to minimise problems with the smoky atmosphere.

Soon 90 trains daily were being handled in the underground section. At first the carriages were unlit, but following protests an incandescent lighting system was provided, powered from a conductor fixed to the tunnel walls. The system was patented by H S P Carswell; it was removed in November 1901.

The smoky atmosphere in the tunnel sections was immediately a cause for serious complaint. Proposed solutions to vent the tunnels proved to be unacceptable to local residents, and for some years the issue remained contentious. Eventually the roof of Charing Cross station was removed.

The four platforms at Queen Street low level station were lettered, A, B, C and D.

=== Bridgeton extension ===
In association with the GC&DR line, the NBR opened a short branch from College to Bridgeton Cross on 1 July 1892 with an intermediate station at Gallowgate, and the G&SWR provided a spur to that line from the City of Glasgow Union line, opening on 1 April 1893. However that service was unsuccessful, and was withdrawn on 1 February 1913; the spur connection was closed.

Bridgeton station area was used for stabling and carriage cleaning, but the station was closed on 4 November 1979 when the Argyle Line opened; the branch continued to be used for carriage servicing for some years.

=== Electrification ===
Under a modernisation scheme of 1955, the GC&DR route was to be electrified as part of a proposed enhancement of the whole of the former NBR North Clyde lines. The four platforms at Queen Street Low Level were closed from 10 to 13 August 1959 for remodelling to a simple two-platform station as a prelude to electrification. Full electrification was inaugurated on 7 November 1960 but a series of transformer explosions in the new electric units resulted in restoration of the steam service, which continued from 19 December until 1 October 1961, when the full electric service was reinstated after modifications to the electrical system of the units.

== The present day ==
The original GC&DR line through the city is open, carrying a busy suburban passenger service operated by ScotRail and previously SPT.

== Topography ==
Locations on the line were:

- Kelvinhaugh Junction; divergence from the Stobcross line and the Glasgow Central Railway;
- Finnieston; opened 15 March 1886; closed 1 January 1917; a Finnieston station was opened on the Argyle Line on 5 November 1979; it was renamed Exhibition Centre 1986;
- Charing Cross; opened 15 March 1886;
- Glasgow Queen Street;
- College; new station 15 March 1886 replacing terminus at higher level; renamed Glasgow High Street 1914;
- High Street East Junction; convergence with City of Glasgow Union Line and College Goods.

== Connections to other lines ==
- NBR Coatbridge Branch at High Street East Junction
- City of Glasgow Union Railway at High Street East Junction and Gallowgate
- Stobcross Railway at Kelvinhaugh Junction
- Glasgow, Dumbarton and Helensburgh Railway at Knightswood North Junction

== Sources ==
- Awdry, Christopher (1990). Encyclopaedia of British Railway Companies. Sparkford: Patrick Stephens Ltd. ISBN 1-8526-0049-7. OCLC 19514063. CN 8983.
- Butt, R. V. J. (October 1995). The Directory of Railway Stations: details every public and private passenger station, halt, platform and stopping place, past and present (1st ed.). Sparkford: Patrick Stephens Ltd. ISBN 978-1-85260-508-7. OCLC 60251199. OL 11956311M.
