= Parkhouse, Glasgow G22 =

Coordinates: 55.890556°N 4.251106°W

Parkhouse: Scottish Gaelic: Taigh na Pàirce
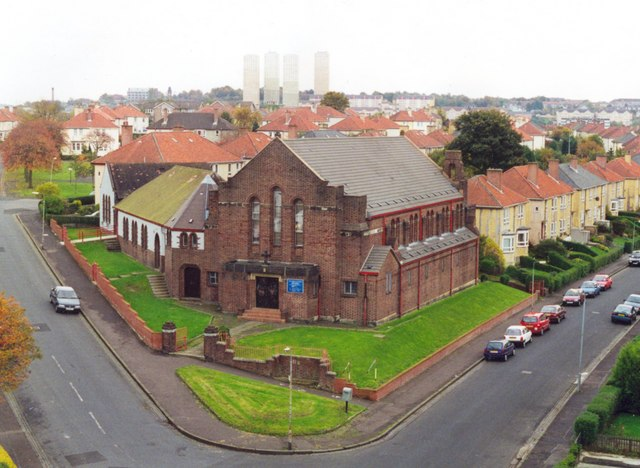
- View to Trinity Possil Church and nearby housing from Broadholm flats (2005)

- Location within Glasgow
- OS grid reference: NS593686
- Council area: Glasgow City Council
- Lieutenancy area: Glasgow
- Country: Scotland
- Sovereign state: United Kingdom
- Post town: GLASGOW
- Postcode district: G22 6
- Dialling code: 0141
- Police: Scotland
- Fire: Scottish
- Ambulance: Scottish
- UK Parliament: Glasgow North East
- Scottish Parliament: Glasgow Maryhill and Springburn

Parkhouse is a neighbourhood of Glasgow, Scotland. Within the G22 postcode area and the Canal ward of the Glasgow City Council administration, it is mainly residential in character having been constructed as a development primarily consisting of cottage flats in the early 1930s, prior to which it was open farmland. Although it can be considered part of the wider Possilpark district (it contains some buildings with the name "Possil"), it is generally separated from Possilpark by the Maryhill Line railway directly to the south.

It is one of two places in Glasgow called Parkhouse, the other being a more modern housing development near Nitshill in the far south of the city. However, they are rarely confused as neither is particularly well known outside local circles, and wider discussions of issues affecting the neighbourhoods take place under the names of their wider wards or constituencies.

== Location and history ==
Its boundaries are not precisely defined, but Parkhouse occupies a roughly rectangular area with the larger suburbs of Milton to the north (the house styles and sub-postcode altering after Ashgill Road), and Possilpark to the south at the Maryhill Line railway tracks. Lambhill and Ruchill are the adjacent neighbourhoods to the west, and an expanse of railway lines with no connecting bridges (the Glasgow–Edinburgh via Falkirk line and part of the Cowlairs depot) separate its territory from Springburn to the east.

At the time of construction, a primary school was also built; Greenview School (also known by other names) in Buckley Street was latterly used as a special education facility before being the target of an arson attack in 2017 while in the early stages of being converted into residences – the work continued regardless. Another, older school in the area, High Possil Senior Secondary School was demolished due to structural problems and replaced by modern apartments, with only its 'category C' Listed gymnasium building on Balmore Road remaining, but in a dilapidated condition.

There is one church serving the community which stands opposite the only multi-storey block of flats in the vicinity (eight stories). A branch of Londis on Ashfield Street provides limited shopping facilities, with some other amenities such as a post office and chemist at Milton, and a wider range at Possilpark. Those areas have experienced drug-related violence and organised crime, and incidents related to this have also occurred in Parkhouse.

On the west side of Balmore Road, outside the residential part of Parkhouse, is a small industrial estate also using that name. This was previously the regional control centre for Scottish Water before the company moved to new premises in Stepps. The disused buildings of Possil railway station are also located there, and it was the also roughly the site of the farm which gave the area its name. In addition to the existing railway, a cutting which once contained the tracks of the Lanarkshire and Dumbartonshire Railway bisects the neighbourhood from east to west. The Hamiltonhill Branch of this line also crossed the territory diagonally (following the line of today's Crowhill Street) towards a goods yard at the Forth and Clyde Canal.

=== Transport ===
In the 21st century, the area is served by two railway stations on the same line: Possilpark & Parkhouse to the west and Ashfield to the east. Bus provision (operated by First Glasgow) is via the frequent (6 per hour) '7A' via Balmore Road and the '75' via Ashfield Street.

=== In popular culture ===
Parkhouse was featured in the 1984 black comedy film Comfort and Joy, when the lead character witnesses an ice cream van being attacked by thugs. The scene was filmed at the corner of Claddens Quadrant and Broadholm Street.

== See also ==
- Parkhouse, Glasgow G53
