= Cadder, Glasgow =

Neighbourhood in Glasgow, Scotland

Coordinates: 55.898377°N 4.275947°W

Cadder: Scots: Cauder
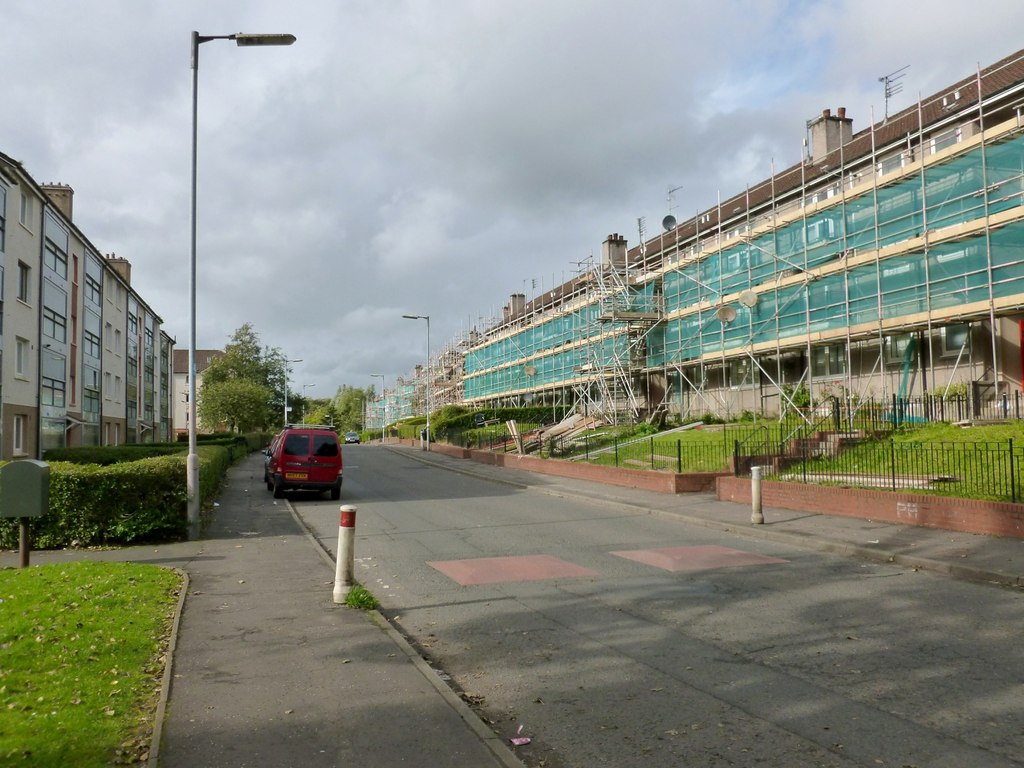
- Tenement housing in the process of refurbishment on Skirsa Street (2012)

- Location within Glasgow
- OS grid reference: NS577695
- Council area: Glasgow
- Country: Scotland
- Sovereign state: United Kingdom
- Post town: GLASGOW
- Postcode district: G23
- Dialling code: 0141
- Police: Scotland
- Fire: Scottish
- Ambulance: Scottish
- UK Parliament: Glasgow North
- Scottish Parliament: Glasgow Maryhill and Springburn

Cadder is a neighbourhood in the north of Glasgow, Scotland. Within the Canal ward under Glasgow City Council, historically more closely associated with the Lambhill and Maryhill districts, it is located 5 kilometres (3 mi) north of Glasgow city centre, sited on the route of the Forth and Clyde Canal. Occupying a footprint which is around 800 metres (870 yd) east to west but only 200 metres (220 yd) north to south on a fairly steep incline, the neighbourhood was built in the late 1940s/early 1950s and borders Glasgow Western Necropolis & Crematorium, Lambhill Cemetery and St. Kentigern's RC Cemetery, as well as Possil Marsh at its eastern side and was itself built on the site of a loch.

This Cadder is not to be confused with Cadder (part of Bishopbriggs) which is about 3 miles (5 km) to the north-east along the canal.

The amenities are mainly local shops located on Skirsa Street and on Cadder Road. The area also has an eponymous primary school, a nursery on Langa Street and formerly St. Agnes' RC Primary School, which has closed – there are now residential properties of various types situated on the old school site. Overall, housing in the area is a mixture of three-and four-storey tenements and semi detached housing, either privately owned or rented by Cadder Housing Association which has its offices on Fara Street. The Community Centre is located on Tresta Road. Streets are named after features of northern Scotland such as the Shetland Islands.

Cadder has transport links, but they are limited, in contrast to nearby neighbourhoods like Summerston. The area is served by First Glasgow bus services. No. 7/7A (Formerly No. 54), and No. 8/8A. There is also a train station on the Maryhill Line that runs between Glasgow Queen Street and Anniesland. At the time of the line's opening in 1993 the station was named "Lambhill", despite being located on the western side of Cadder some distance from the Lambhill neighbourhood. It was renamed Gilshochill railway station in May 1998.

In 2022, a book was published on life growing up in the scheme – written by Jeff Holmes, it contains stories and photographs contributed by many local residents.
