= Dawsholm Park =

Park in Glasgow, Scotland

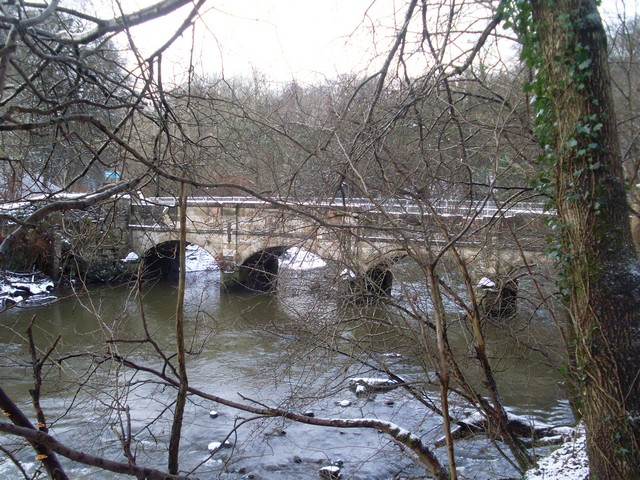
- Stone bridge crossing the River Kelvin in Dawsholm Park
- Interactive map of Dawsholm Park
- Type: Local Nature Reserve
- Location: Glasgow, Scotland
- Coordinates: 55.899°N 4.308°W
- Area: 33 ha (82 acres)
- Created: 1922
- Operator: Glasgow City Council
- Open: All year

Dawsholm Park is a public park in Glasgow, Scotland, adjoining the Kelvindale, Maryhill and Temple areas of the city, and southern parts of the town of Bearsden. It is situated on the River Kelvin, north of the River Clyde. The park covers an area of 33 hectares (82 acres), and consists mostly of woodland, with some grass and wildflower meadows in the southeast area of the park.

The park was created from lands purchased by Glasgow City Council from Sir Archibald Campbell of Succoth, in 1922. As well as the woodland area (originally called the Belvidere plantation), the Council also purchased some grassy areas to the south of the woodland. Sir Archibald then gifted an area of land contaminated with oil shale waste adjoining the eastern boundary of the woodland. The council levelled and grassed over that area to form a recreation area laid out with football pitches.

The woodland area of the park has always been kept in a natural state, and in 2007 Glasgow City Council designated the park as a Local Nature Reserve. As part of the environmental and ecological work in the park, Highland Cattle are being used in a managed grazing programme on the grassy areas, to encourage the development of wildflower meadows.

The peripheries of the park include the University of Glasgow School of Veterinary Medicine, the institution's sporting facilities (Garscube Complex), the West of Scotland Science Park, and one of the four main waste recycling facilities in the city, serving its north-west sector. The SE entrance to the park is very close to Kelvindale railway station which is served by trains running between Anniesland and Glasgow Queen Street via Maryhill.

== See also ==
- Garscadden Wood
