= Possilpark & Parkhouse railway station =

Railway station in Glasgow, Scotland

Possilpark & Parkhouse Scottish Gaelic: Pàirc Phosail & Taigh na Pàirce
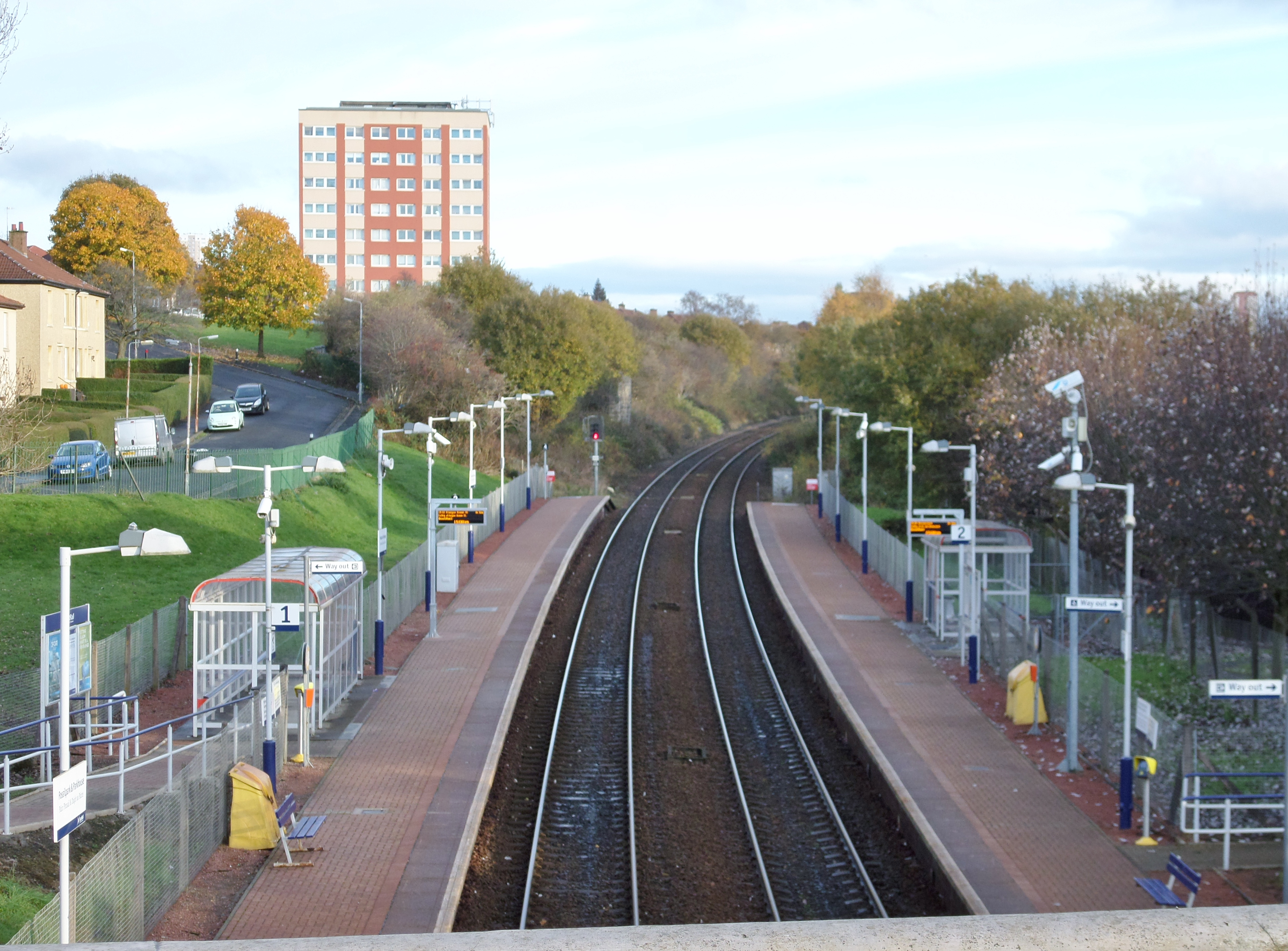
- View east towards Ashfield

General information
- Location: Possilpark, Glasgow; Scotland
- Coordinates: 55.8901°N 4.2578°W
- Grid reference: NS588686
- Manager: ScotRail
- Platforms: 2

Other information
- Station code: PPK

History
- Original company: British Rail

Key dates
- 2 December 1993: Opened

Passengers
- 2021/22: ▲49,776
- 2022/23: ▲61,510
- 2023/24: ▲83,832
- 2024/25: ▲87,906
- 2025/26: ▲0.107 million
Location
Notes
- Passenger statistics from the Office of Rail and Road

Possilpark & Parkhouse railway station serves the Possilpark and Parkhouse areas of Glasgow, Scotland. It is located on the Maryhill Line, 3 miles (5 km) north of Glasgow Queen Street. Services are provided by ScotRail on behalf of Strathclyde Partnership for Transport.

== History ==
The station was one of five built for Maryhill Line project, which was supported by what was then the Strathclyde Passenger Transport Executive and completed by British Rail on 2 December 1993. The others were Maryhill, Summerston, Lambhill, and Ashfield at a cost of £2.2m (equivalent to £4,730,000 in 2025).

The route on which the station stands is considerably older though, being opened by the Glasgow, Dumbarton and Helensburgh Railway in 1858 - this would later be used by trains from the West Highland Line to reach the main line at Cowlairs and thus reach Queen Street High Level. The GD&HR's successors the North British Railway built a station to serve Possilpark on the line in 1885, but this was located a short distance west of the present station and was closed to passengers in January 1917 (though goods traffic continued until 1971). Services initially ran only as far as Maryhill, with the extension to Anniesland opening in 2005.

== Services ==
Between Monday and Saturday, there is a half-hourly service eastbound to Glasgow Queen Street and westbound to Anniesland via Maryhill.

Since 18 May 2014, a limited hourly Sunday service now operates on this line from 09:30 to 19:00.

== See also ==
- Possil railway station

Preceding station	National Rail	Following station
Ashfield	ScotRail; Maryhill Line	Gilshochill
