= Cadder =

District of Bishopbriggs, Scotland

Coordinates: 55.92°N 04.22°W

Cadder: Scottish Gaelic: Coile Dobhair
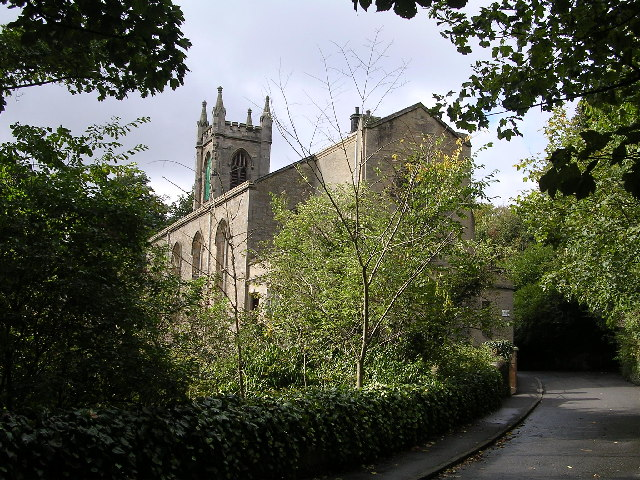
- Cadder parish church erected in 1830

- Location within East Dunbartonshire
- OS grid reference: NS6172
- Council area: East Dunbartonshire
- Country: Scotland
- Sovereign state: United Kingdom
- Post town: GLASGOW
- Postcode district: G64
- Dialling code: 0141
- Police: Scotland
- Fire: Scottish
- Ambulance: Scottish
- UK Parliament: East Dunbartonshire
- Scottish Parliament: Strathkelvin and Bearsden

Cadder (Scottish Gaelic: Coille Dobhair) is a district of the town of Bishopbriggs, East Dunbartonshire, Scotland. It is located 7 km north of Glasgow city centre, 0.5 km south of the River Kelvin, and approximately 1.5 km north-east of Bishopbriggs town centre, sited on the route of the Forth and Clyde Canal. There is a Glasgow council housing scheme of a similar name, generally pronounced Cawder, in the district of Lambhill some 3 miles (5 km) to the south-west along the Canal, which was built in the early 1950s. Similarly, within Cadder, there is Cawder Golf Club, which also uses that original pronunciation.

== History ==
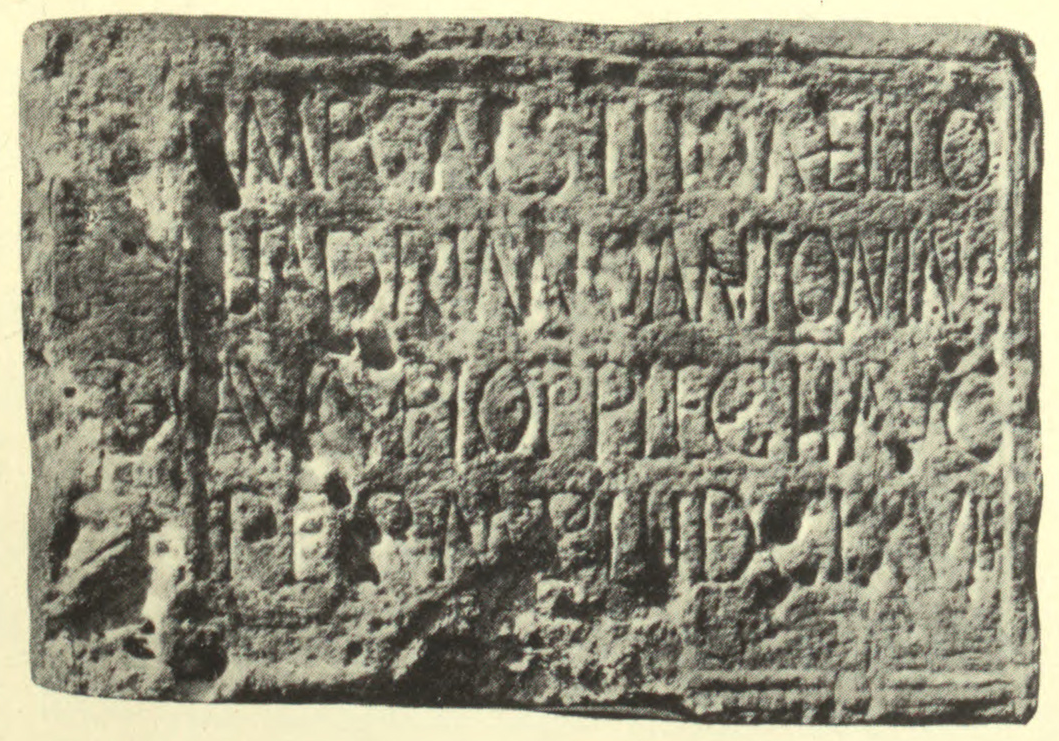
Distance slab of the Second Legion found built into Cawder House. George MacDonald calls in no. 5 in the 2nd edition of his book The Roman Wall in Scotland.

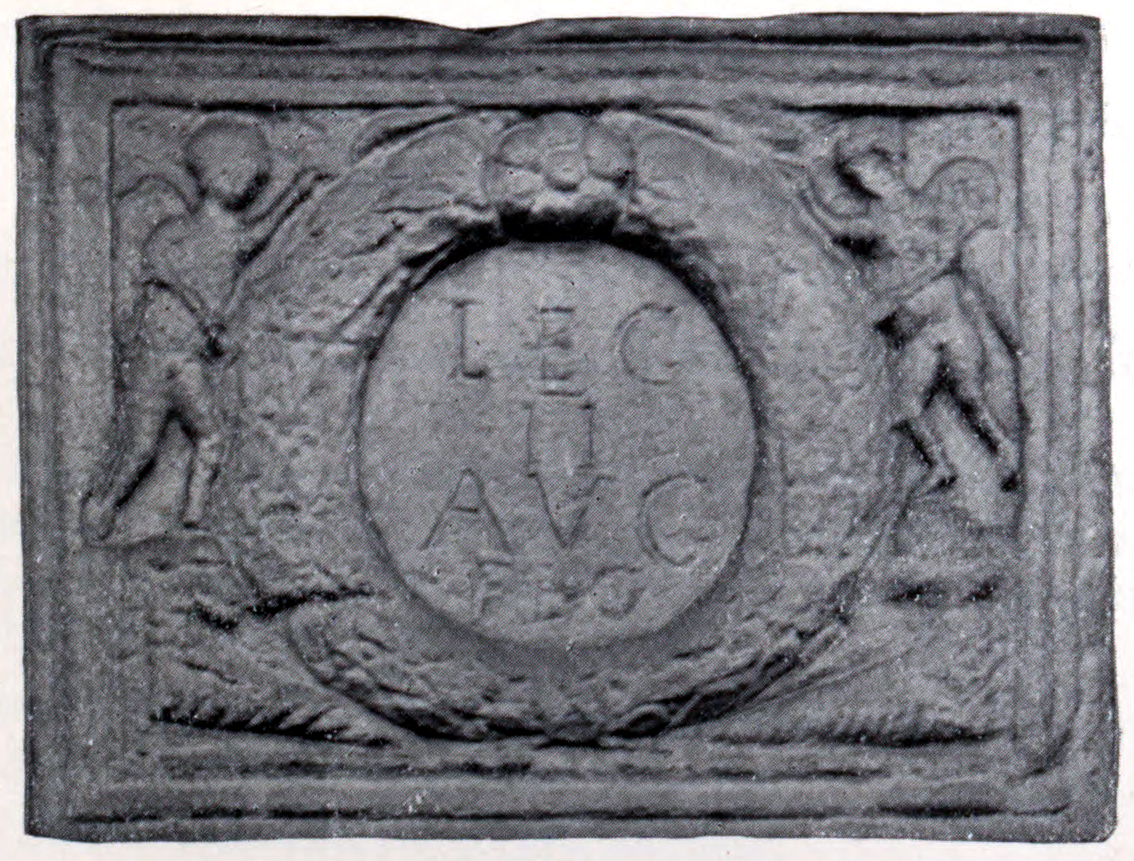
Distance slab of the Second Legion found built into Cawder House. George MacDonald calls in no. 26 in the 2nd edition of his book The Roman Wall in Scotland. He suggests it may have been from Auchendavy since other 2nd Legion distance slabs were found there.

In antiquity, Cadder was the site of a Roman fort on the route of the Antonine Wall. Its neighbouring forts are Balmuildy to the west and Kirkintilloch to the east although there are intermediate fortlets at Wilderness Plantation to the west and Glasgow Bridge to the east. The Second Legion may have been responsible for building the fort. John Clarke of the Glasgow Archaeological Society excavated the remains in the 1930s. Sir George Macdonald also wrote about the excavation of the site. The site was destroyed by sand quarrying in the 1940s. A sketch of the medieval motte made by Skinner still survives. One find at Cadder was an oil lamp which is associated with the bath house of the fort. Before the Reformation the lands of Cadder and the kirk belonged to the Bishops of Glasgow. In the 18th century James Dunlop of Garnkirk being a wealthy landowner opposed Thomas Muir and the congregation at Cadder over who appointed their minister. Cadder Parish Church was described in the 19th century as a neat modern Gothic church. Cadder House was a property held by the Stirling family for generations.

== Cadder Today ==
Cadder has a large cemetery, is also the site of Strathkelvin Retail Park and Low Moss (HM Prison).

== Gallery ==
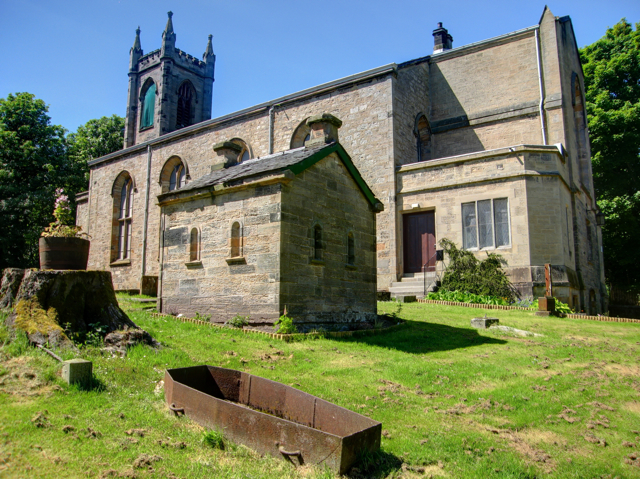
watchhouse and iron mortsafe at Cadder Parish Church

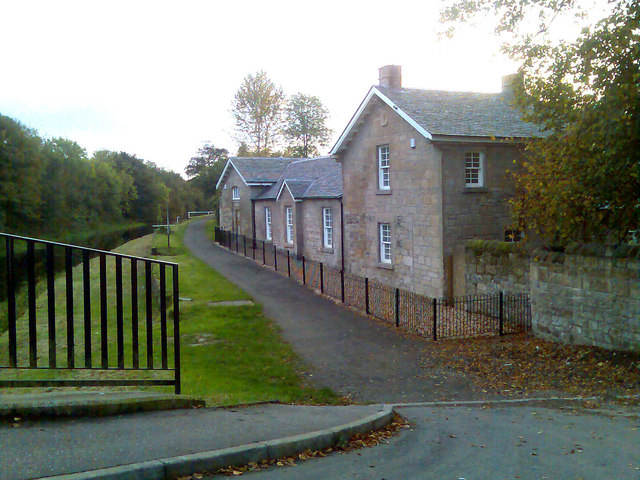
Cadder stables

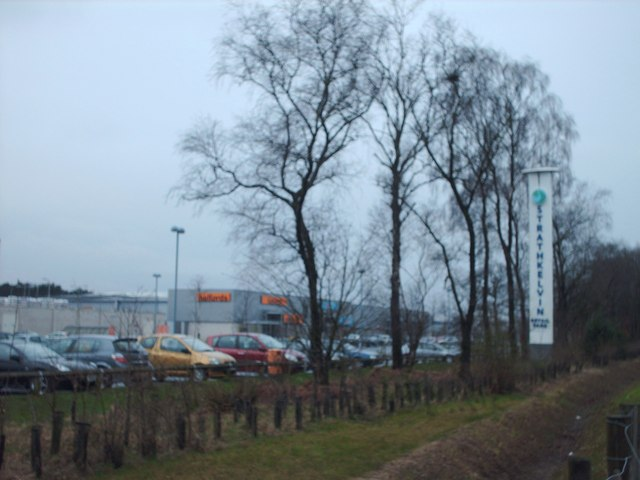
Strathkelvin retail park

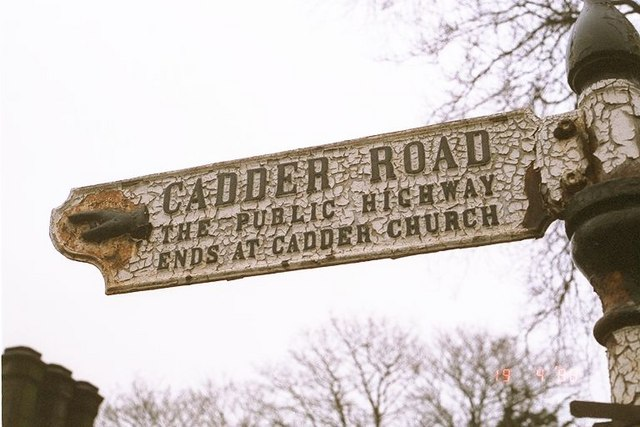
Cadder Road sign

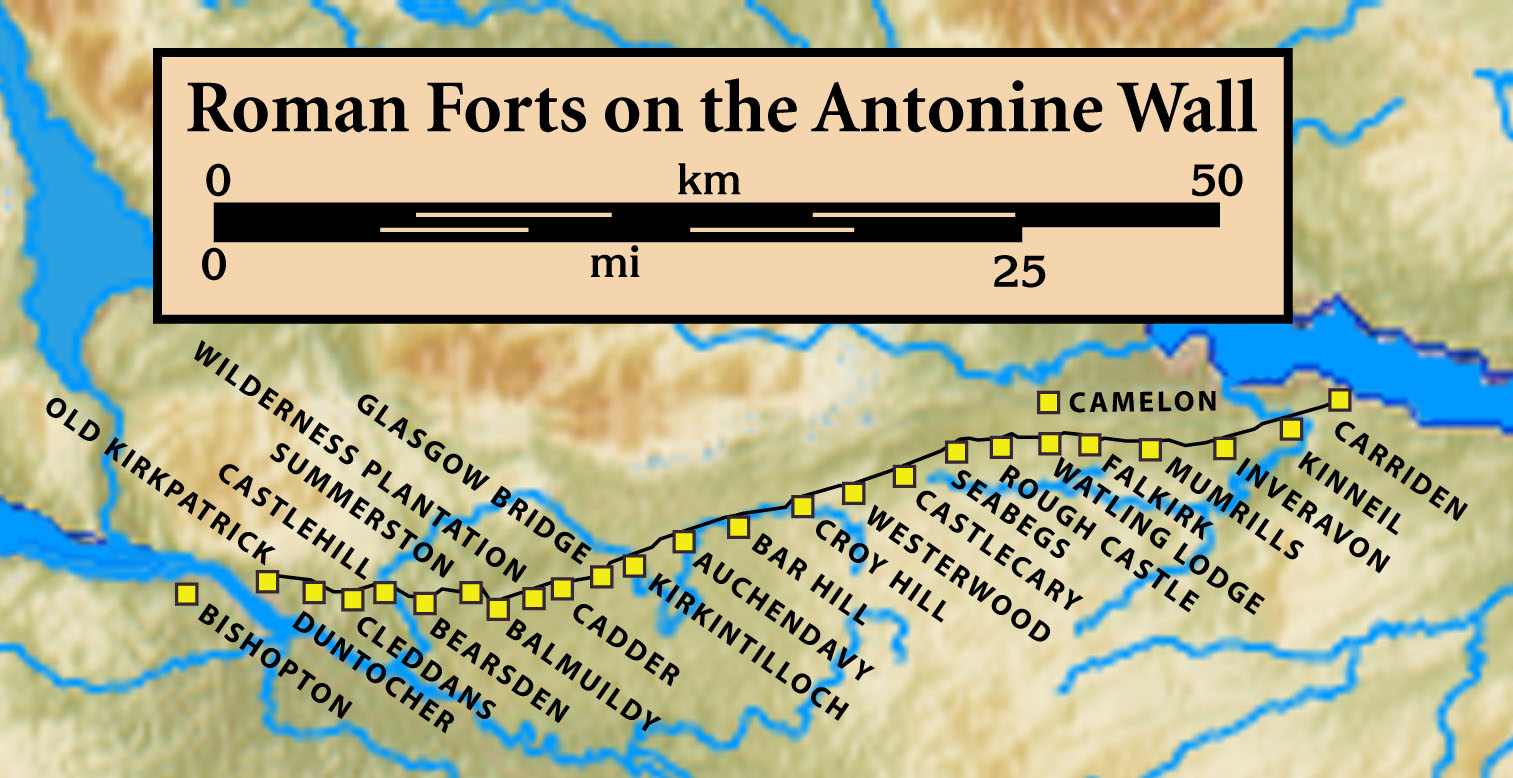
Forts and Fortlets associated with the Antonine Wall from west to east: Bishopton, Old Kilpatrick, Duntocher, Cleddans, Castlehill, Bearsden, Summerston, Balmuildy, Wilderness Plantation, Cadder, Glasgow Bridge, Kirkintilloch, Auchendavy, Bar Hill, Croy Hill, Westerwood, Castlecary, Seabegs, Rough Castle, Camelon, Watling Lodge, Falkirk, Mumrills, Inveravon, Kinneil, Carriden

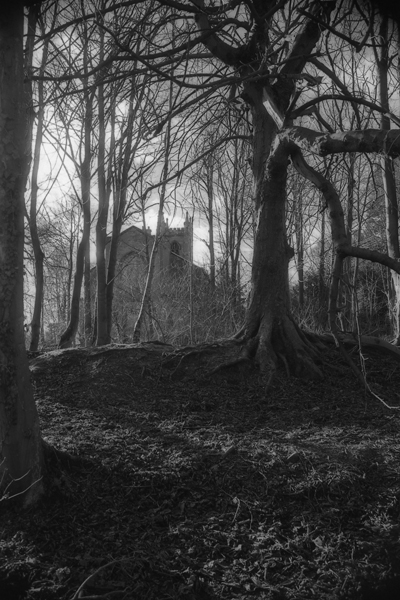
Cadder Kirk from the Forth and Clyde Canal
