= Gilshochill railway station =

Railway station in Glasgow, Scotland

Gilshochill
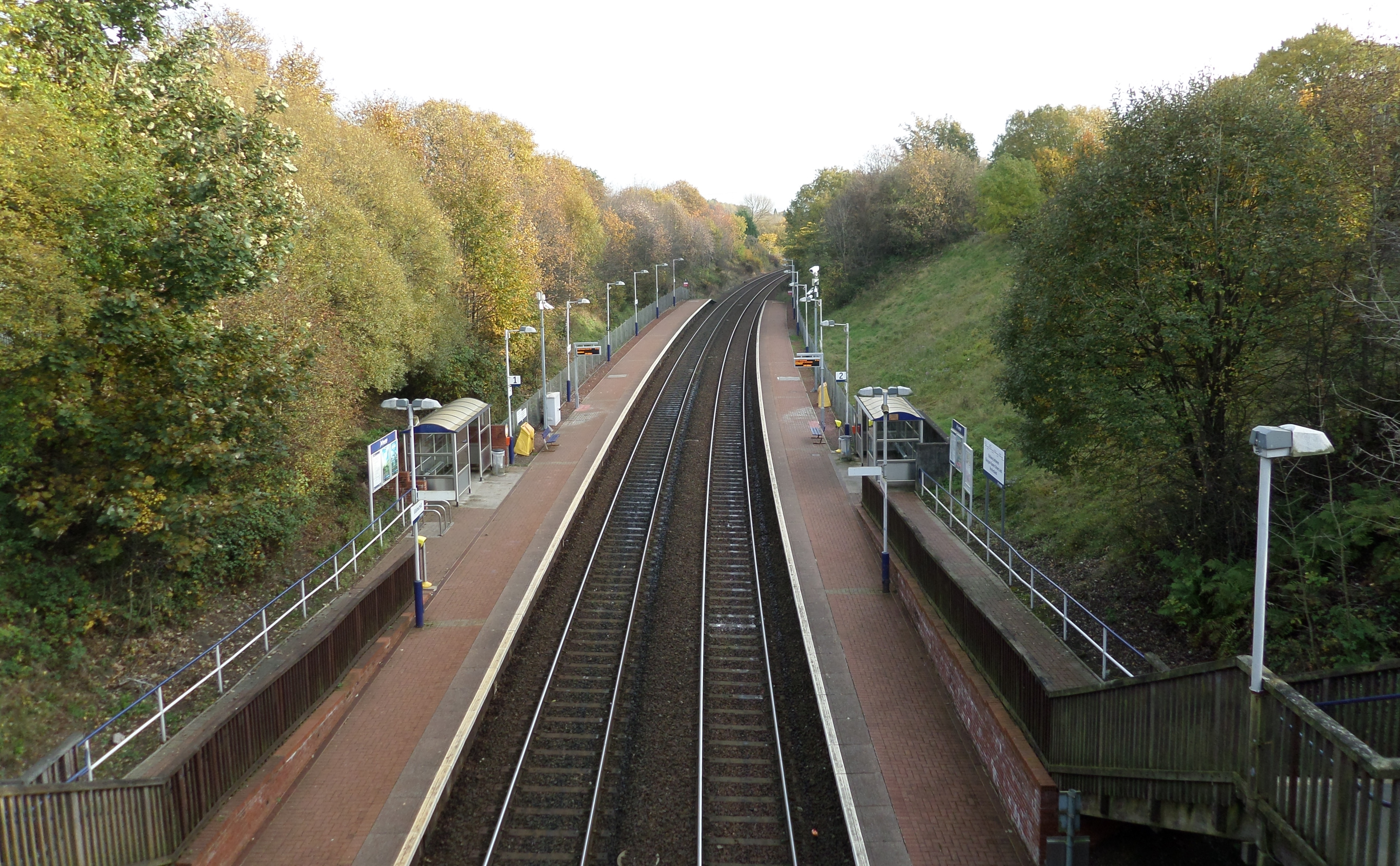

General information
- Location: Gilshochill, Glasgow; Scotland
- Coordinates: 55.8973°N 4.2825°W
- Grid reference: NS573695
- Manager: ScotRail
- Platforms: 2

Other information
- Station code: GSC

History
- Original company: British Rail

Key dates
- December 1993: Opened as Lambhill
- 24 May 1998: Renamed Gilshochill

Passengers
- 2021/22: ▲42,708
- 2022/23: ▲53,666
- 2023/24: ▲76,944
- 2024/25: ▼68,720
- 2025/26: ▲80,600
Location
Notes
- Passenger statistics from the Office of Rail and Road

Gilshochill railway station is a railway station serving the Gilshochill, Maryhill and Cadder areas of Glasgow, Scotland. The station is located on the Maryhill Line, 3 1/4 miles (5 km) north west of Glasgow Queen Street. Services are provided by ScotRail on behalf of Strathclyde Partnership for Transport.

== History ==
The station was one of five opened by British Rail on 2 December 1993 at Maryhill, Summerston, Lambhill, Possilpark & Parkhouse and Ashfield at a cost of £2.2m (equivalent to £4,730,000 in 2025).

It was named Gilshochill on 24 May 1998 under Railtrack.

== Services ==
From Monday to Saturday, there is a half-hourly service eastbound to Glasgow Queen Street and westbound to Anniesland.

With the timetable revision starting on 18 May 2014, a limited hourly Sunday service now operates on this line between 09:30 and 19:00.

Preceding station	National Rail	Following station
Possilpark & Parkhouse	ScotRail; Maryhill Line	Summerston
