= Gilshochill =

Area of Glasgow, Scotland

Coordinates: 55.8962°N 4.28072°W

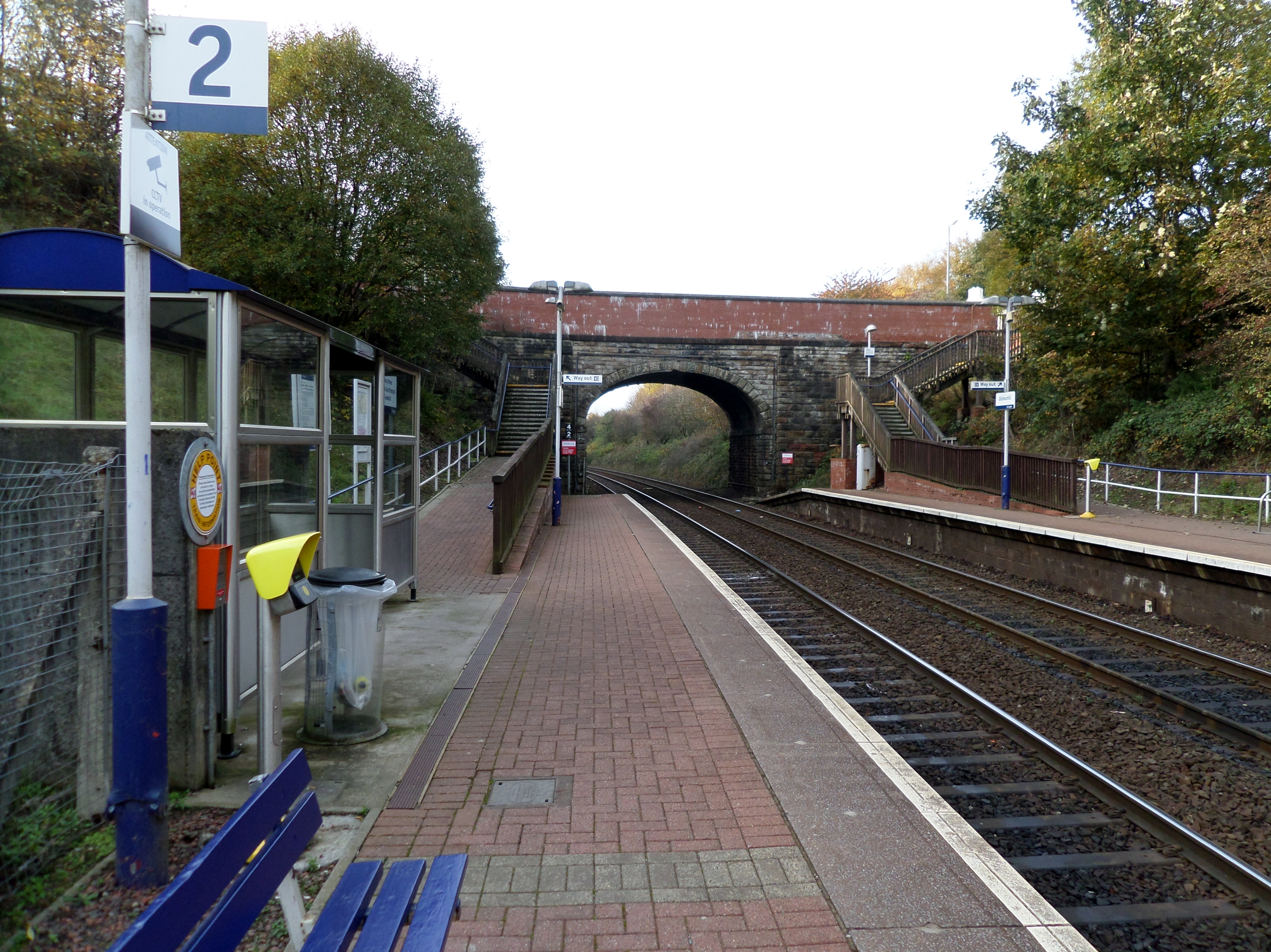
- Gilshochill railway station, 2016

- Location within Glasgow
- OS grid reference: NS5748469360
- Council area: Glasgow City Council
- Lieutenancy area: Glasgow
- Country: Scotland
- Sovereign state: United Kingdom
- Post town: Glasgow
- Postcode district: G20
- Dialling code: 0141
- Police: Scotland
- Fire: Scottish
- Ambulance: Scottish
- UK Parliament: Glasgow North
- Scottish Parliament: Glasgow Maryhill and Springburn

Gilshochill (/ˈɡɪlʃiˌhɪl/ GIL-shee-hil; Scots: Gilshochull) is located to the north west of Maryhill in the city of Glasgow, Scotland. Immediately north of Maryhill basin and Maryhill locks, it is the district where the Bowling and Port Dundas branches of the Forth and Clyde Canal meet at Stockingfield Junction. Situated on a hill overlooking Glasgow, its highest point sits at an elevation of about 150 metres above sea level. Gilshochill is spread over the area around Sandbank Street, bordering the areas of Cadder and Summerston. It falls under the G20 area postal code. It is served by Gilshochill railway station. A new footbridge connecting the area with Ruchill and providing a better link to Maryhill was installed across the canal at Stockingfield Junction in 2022.

Gilshochill is set in one of the oldest areas in Maryhill; one of the oldest churches in the area is found here, dating from the late 17th century. Some houses built around the same time can also be found there. Gilshochill comprises semi-detached privately owned homes set in private housing estates overlooking Glasgow, some Victorian, 16th- and 17th-century buildings. There are also several towers, such as the 20-storey high rise tower blocks at Glenavon Road, and some tenements. In June 2024, planning consent was submitted to Glasgow City Council for the redevelopment of the area, specifically for new homes on waste ground where derelict mid-20th century apartment blocks and terraced houses had been demolished a decade earlier.

== See also ==
- Forth to Firth Canal Pathway
- Glasgow tower blocks
