= Summerston railway station =

Railway station in Glasgow, Scotland

Summerston
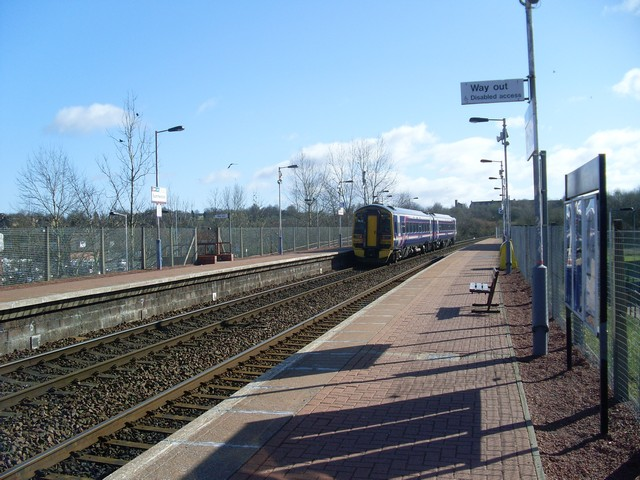

General information
- Location: Summerston, Glasgow; Scotland
- Coordinates: 55.8988°N 4.2921°W
- Grid reference: NS567696
- Manager: ScotRail
- Platforms: 2

Other information
- Station code: SUM

History
- Original company: British Rail

Key dates
- 2 December 1993: Opened

Passengers
- 2021/22: ▲71,268
- 2022/23: ▲81,788
- 2023/24: ▲0.118 million
- 2024/25: ▼0.114 million
- 2025/26: ▲0.132 million
Location
Notes
- Passenger statistics from the Office of Rail and Road

Summerston railway station is a railway station serving the Summerston area of Glasgow, Scotland. It is located on the Maryhill Line, 4 1/4 miles (7 kilometres) northwest of Glasgow Queen Street. Services are provided by ScotRail previously on behalf of Strathclyde Partnership for Transport.

== History ==
The original Summerston station (closed in 1951) was located about 1 1/2 miles (2.5 km) to the north of the present station on the defunct and dismantled Kelvin Valley Railway line between Maryhill and Kilsyth.

The station was one of five opened by British Rail on 2 December 1993 at Maryhill, Summerston, Lambhill, Possilpark & Parkhouse and Ashfield at a cost of £2.2m (equivalent to £4,730,000 in 2025).

The route on which it stands though is considerably older, being opened in 1858 by the Glasgow, Dumbarton and Helensburgh Railway and later used by West Highland Line to reach Queen Street High Level and the former Edinburgh and Glasgow Railway main line. Services initially terminated at Maryhill when the line first opened, but were subsequently extended through to Anniesland in 2005 to give access to the North Clyde Line.

== Services ==
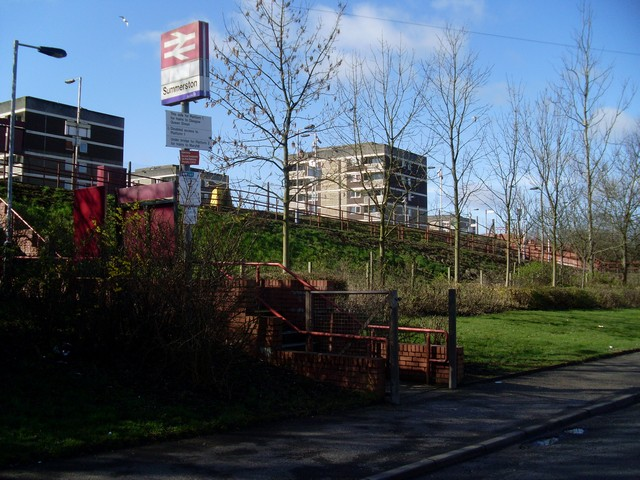
View from street level up to the platforms.

Between Monday and Saturday, there is a half-hourly service eastbound to Glasgow Queen Street and westbound to Anniesland (where connections can be made for the North Clyde Line). With the timetable revision that started on 18 May 2014, a limited hourly Sunday service now operates on this route between 09:30 and 19:00.

Preceding station	National Rail	Following station
Gilshochill	ScotRail; Maryhill Line	Maryhill
