= Possilpark =

District of Glasgow, Scotland

Coordinates: 55.885397°N 4.252640°W

Possilpark: Scottish Gaelic: Pàirc Phosail; Scots: Possolpairk or simply Posso
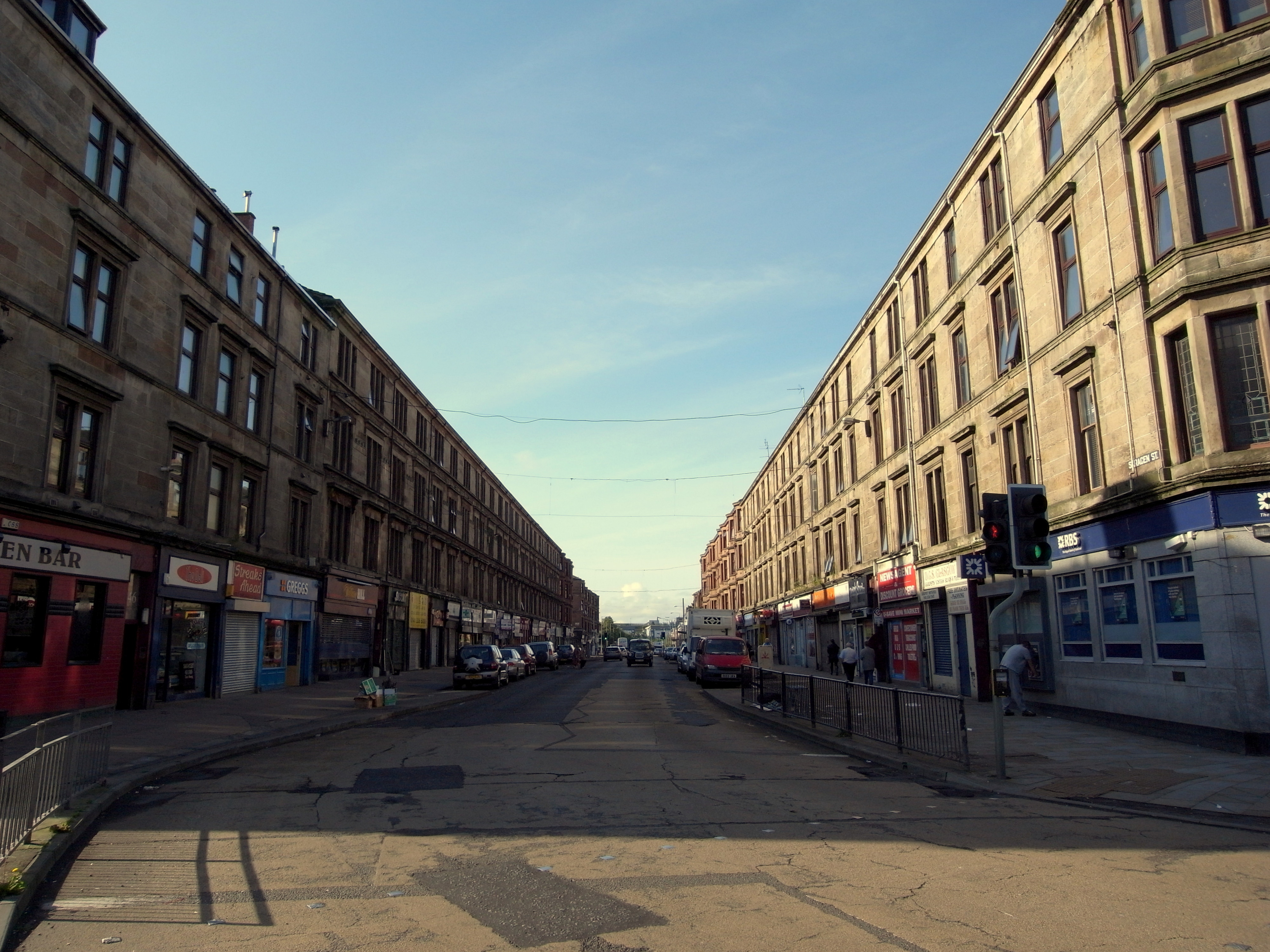
- Saracen Street, view from Saracen Cross

- Location within Glasgow
- OS grid reference: NS592681
- Council area: Glasgow
- Lieutenancy area: Glasgow
- Country: Scotland
- Sovereign state: United Kingdom
- Post town: GLASGOW
- Postcode district: G22
- Dialling code: 0141
- Police: Scotland
- Fire: Scottish
- Ambulance: Scottish
- UK Parliament: Glasgow North East
- Scottish Parliament: Glasgow Maryhill and Springburn

Possilpark, colloquially known as Possil, is a district in the Scottish city of Glasgow, situated north of the River Clyde and centred around Saracen Street. The area developed around Saracen Foundry of Walter MacFarlane & Co., which was the main employer. In the wake of the Saracen Foundry's closure in 1967, this part of Glasgow became one of the poorest in the United Kingdom, and decades later deprivation and crime rates remain high.

A variety of diverse community organisations operate in the area, providing arts, sports, health and gardening provision and community regeneration, including Young People's Futures, The Concrete Garden, Possobilities and Friends of Possilpark Greenspace. The district is served by both Possilpark & Parkhouse and Ashfield railway stations on the Maryhill Line.

== History ==
=== Upper and Lower Possil estate ===
In 1242, Alexander II of Scotland granted certain lands to the Bishop of Glasgow. These included the lands in the north referred to as Possele, divided in the sixteenth century into Over or Upper Possil, and Nether or Lower Possil.

The region known as Nether Possil was acquired in 1595 by Robert Crawford, who was the son of Hew Crawford of Cloberhill. In 1644 James Gilhagie of Kenniehill bought the estate, part of an old and rich Glasgow family with interests in coal, the Caribbean, Madeira and the Canary Islands. However, by 1698 Gilhagie had fallen on hard times, and after burning his properties in 1677 in Saltmarket and adjoining streets, applied to the Scots Parliament for assistance. After passing through various creditors hands, the lands were acquired in 1697 by Edinburgh writer John Forbes, who built a house. After being owned by his son, the estate was sold to in 1744 to merchant William Crawfurd of Birkhead, who in 1749 acquired Easter Nether Possil, he thus reunited the lands which had been subdivided in 1588.

In 1808, the estate was acquired by Colonel Alexander Campbell, son of Glasgow merchant John Campbell senior, founder of the West Indian trading house of John Campbell sen. & Co. Colonel Campbell had served during the battles in South Africa, being present at the capture of the Cape of Good Hope in 1806, and at the Battle of Corunna where he commanded the 20th Regiment. Having bought the adjoining estate of Keppoch in 1838, the family seat had transferred there. Campbell rented Possil house and a park to Sir Archibald Alison, 1st Baronet, who as the lawyer son of Scottish writer Archibald Alison, had in 1834 become Sheriff of Lanarkshire. The house and park lands as laid out then, were described then as:

It (Possil house) was then far away from the noise and smoke of the city, and stood among fine old trees. With its beautiful gardens, its grassy slopes, and its clear lake, Possil formed as delightful and retired a country residence as any in the county.

=== Saracen Foundry ===
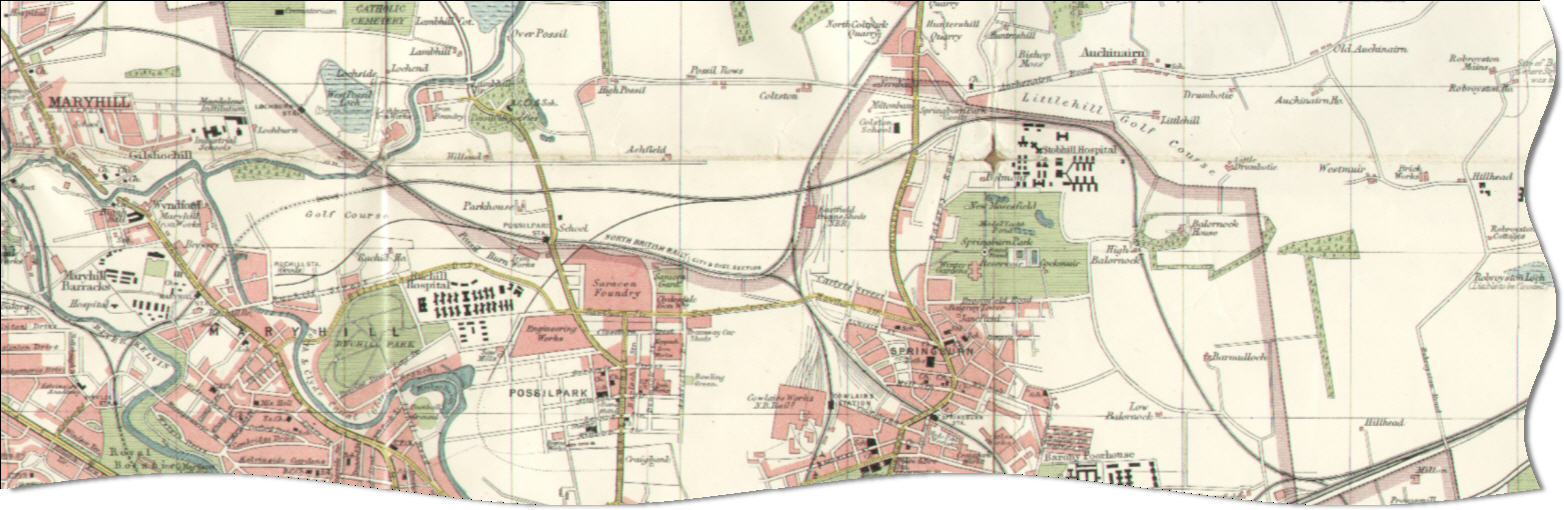
Map showing Possilpark in the early 1900s.

On the death of Colonel Campbell in 1849, the estate passed to his son. When Walter MacFarlane wished to vastly expand his Saracen Foundry company, Campbell agreed to sell MacFarlane 100 acres (0.40 km^{2}) of the estate including the house, on which to build a vast new works.

MacFarlane renamed the estate Possilpark, which grew from a population of 10 people in 1872 to 10,000 by 1891, at which time the area was incorporated into the city officially. MacFarlane oversaw the removal of all the woodlands and after creating railway access to his foundry, laid out the rest of the park land as a grid plan of streets and tenements, including naming the main street running through the new suburb "Saracen Street". After Alison's death in 1867, the main house was also demolished as the foundry works expanded.

The grid layout of Possilpark was described by the then Glasgow Town Council as: "... [o]ne of the finest and best conducted in Glasgow, and the new suburb of Possil Park, laid out by them with skill and intelligence, is rapidly becoming an important addition to the great city." The Saracen foundry made a series of decorative iron works, from railings and water fountains to park bandstands. These were exported all over the British Empire, and can still be found in many parts of Britain, including a reproduction placed at Saracen Cross in Possilpark itself in 2001.

Following World War II, the combination of the collapse of the British Empire, the move away from steam power and the adaptation of new designs and materials meant a vast decline in orders for Saracen's standard cast iron designs. The MacFarlane company moved into standard foundry work, including being one of five foundries casting Sir Giles Gilbert Scott's classic K6 telephone box for the General Post Office. After a take over of the company in 1965, the works closed and the infrastructure was demolished in 1967. The foundry site is now occupied by a number of commercial firms, including Allied Motors.

== Present day ==
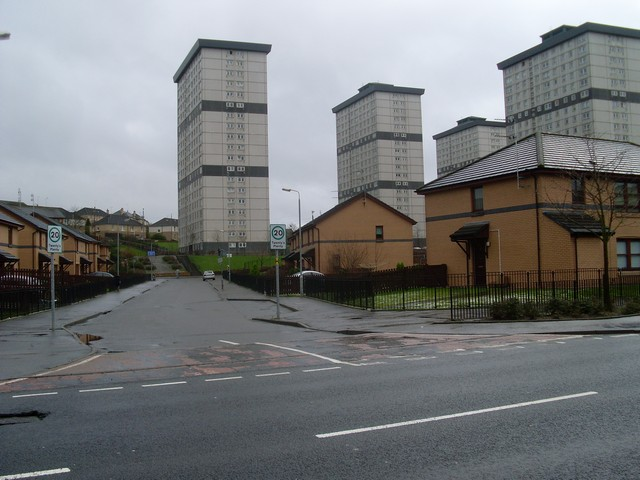
Westercommon Road high flats and modern houses

Within fifteen years of the closing of the Saracen foundry, Possil had become the hub of the Glasgow heroin trade, and was to remain so during the 1980s. Large portions of the Possil have been destroyed, many of the old tenements being flattened and the residents forced to move to other areas. Saracen Street remains the main shopping area, but the whole area has been undergoing mass redevelopment since the late 1990s, which has seen many new houses being built. More and more small local businesses are appearing in Saracen Street as well. A sports centre (Millennium Centre) was constructed to highlight the rebirth of Possil, but has since closed down and been demolished.

Following the lead of his friend Sir Tom Hunter, in April 2008, English real estate tycoon Nick Leslau spent 10 days in Possilpark filming Channel 4's The Secret Millionaire, eventually giving away £225,000 to projects including Possobilities, formerly known as The Disability Community.

In 2012, the "Scottish Index of Multiple Deprivation" analysis by the Scottish Government identified Possilpark and Keppochhill as the 2nd and 3rd most deprived areas in Scotland.

== Notable residents ==
- Peter Capaldi, actor
- Kevin Harper, footballer
- Eddie Kelly, footballer
- Dickson Mabon, politician
- Willy Maley, literary critic
- Lena Martell, singer
- Alex Massie, footballer
- Gil Paterson, politician
- Willie Carr, footballer
- Gerry Gray, footballer
- Jim Watt, world champion boxer
- Kenny Dalglish, international footballer attended Possil Senior Secondary and played for Possilpark YMCA
- Alex McDade, writer of the original version of the Jarama Valley song during the Spanish Civil War
- Jake Black, singer of Alabama 3, songwriter of the famous Sopranos theme tune 'Woke Up This Morning'
- Edward McGuire, composer
- Fran Healy (musician), singer of Scottish band Travis

== See also ==
- Glasgow tower blocks
- Possilpark and Parkhouse railway station
- Vogue Cinema Possilpark
- Possil railway station
