= Lochburn railway station =

Disused railway station in Maryhill, Glasgow

Coordinates: 55.895318°N 4.277963°W

Lochburn

General information
- Location: Maryhill, Glasgow; Scotland
- Platforms: 2

Other information
- Status: Disused

History
- Original company: North British Railway
- Pre-grouping: North British Railway

Key dates
- 1 May 1890: Opened
- 1 January 1917: Closed

Lochburn railway station served the area of Maryhill, Glasgow, Scotland, from 1890 to 1917 on the Glasgow, Dumbarton and Helensburgh Railway.

== History ==
The station was opened on 1 May 1890 by the North British Railway. On the eastbound platform was the station building. To the southeast was the signal box, which opened in 1888. It controlled the sidings to Lochburn Iron Works, which was to the east. To the south was a siding which served Phoenix Chemical Works. This was later extended and the works became Kelvindale Chemical Works. There was also a siding behind the signal box. The station closed on 1 January 1917.

Preceding station	Historical railways	Following station
Maryhill; Line and station open	North British Railway; Glasgow, Dumbarton and Helensburgh Railway	Possilpark; Line open, station closed
