= Ashfield railway station (Scotland) =

Railway station in Glasgow, Scotland

Ashfield Scottish Gaelic: Achadh an Uinnsinn
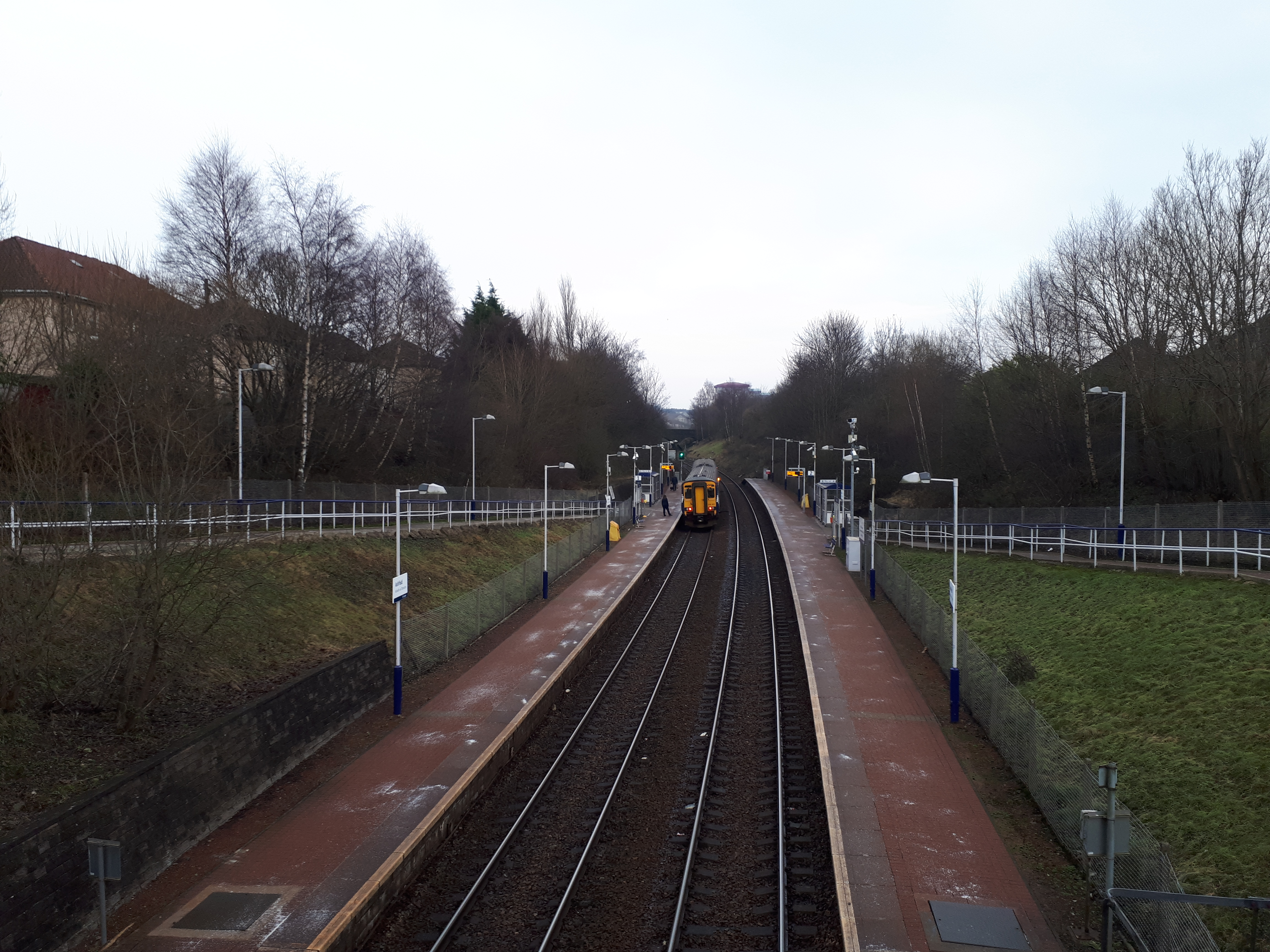
- Ashfield railway station, looking towards Glasgow Queen Street

General information
- Location: Milton, Glasgow; Scotland
- Coordinates: 55.8888°N 4.2484°W
- Grid reference: NS595684
- Manager: ScotRail
- Transit authority: SPT
- Platforms: 2

Other information
- Station code: ASF

History
- Original company: British Rail

Key dates
- 6 December 1993: Station opened

Passengers
- 2021/22: ▲45,230
- 2022/23: ▲52,060
- 2023/24: ▲69,608
- 2024/25: ▼64,718
- 2025/26: ▲79,030
Location
Notes
- Passenger statistics from the Office of Rail and Road

Ashfield railway station is a railway station serving the Milton and Parkhouse areas of Glasgow, Scotland. It is located on the Maryhill Line, 2 1/2 miles (4 km) north of Glasgow Queen Street, a short distance west of Cowlairs North Junction. It has two side platforms. Services are provided by ScotRail on behalf of Strathclyde Partnership for Transport (SPT).

== History ==
Opened on 2 December 1993 under British Rail management during the Sectorisation era introduced in the 1980s, the station was served by ScotRail until it was privatised on 31 March 1997. It was one of five new stations to be opened as part of the Maryhill Line project, with three of them (including this one) on new sites, the others being Maryhill, Summerston, Lambhill, and Possilpark & Parkhouse at a cost of £2.2m (equivalent to £4,730,000 in 2025).

The line through the station is however a lot older, being opened back in 1858 by the Glasgow, Dumbarton and Helensburgh Railway and has been used since the latter end of the 19th century by West Highland Line passenger and freight trains to reach the Edinburgh and Glasgow Railway main line at Cowlairs and hence Queen Street High Level.

== Services ==
Monday to Saturdays there is a half-hourly service eastbound to Glasgow Queen Street and westbound to Anniesland, where connections are available for North Clyde Line services.

Since 18 May 2014, a limited hourly Sunday service now operates on this line – trains call between 09:30 and 19:00.

== Notes ==
Preceding station	National Rail	Following station
Glasgow Queen Street	ScotRail; Maryhill Line	Possilpark & Parkhouse
