= Anniesland =

District in Glasgow, Scotland

Coordinates: 55.890224°N 4.331285°W

Anniesland: Scottish Gaelic: Fearann Anna
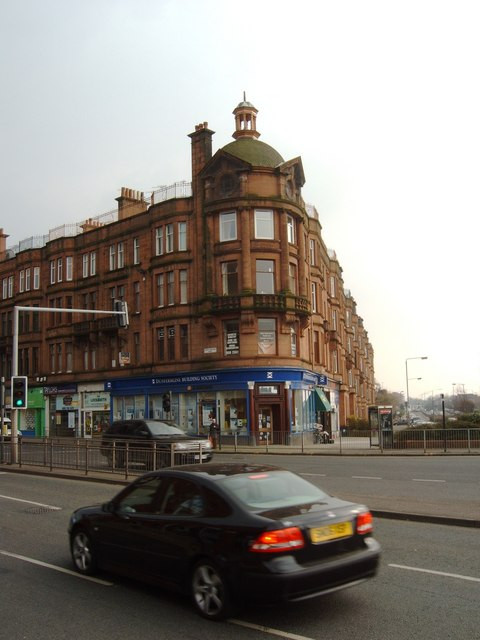
- Buildings at Anniesland Cross

- Location within Glasgow
- OS grid reference: NS543688
- Council area: Glasgow City Council
- Lieutenancy area: Glasgow
- Country: Scotland
- Sovereign state: United Kingdom
- Post town: GLASGOW
- Postcode district: G13
- Dialling code: 0141
- Police: Scotland
- Fire: Scottish
- Ambulance: Scottish
- UK Parliament: Glasgow West
- Scottish Parliament: Glasgow Anniesland

Anniesland (Scottish Gaelic: Fearann Anna) is a district in the West End of the Scottish city Glasgow. It is situated north of the River Clyde, and centres on the major road junction of the Great Western Road (A82) and Crow Road/Bearsden Road (A739), known as Anniesland Cross.

== History and amenities ==
Originally a farm owned by the Jordanhill estate, it was slowly sold off during the late Victorian era as Glasgow quickly expanded.

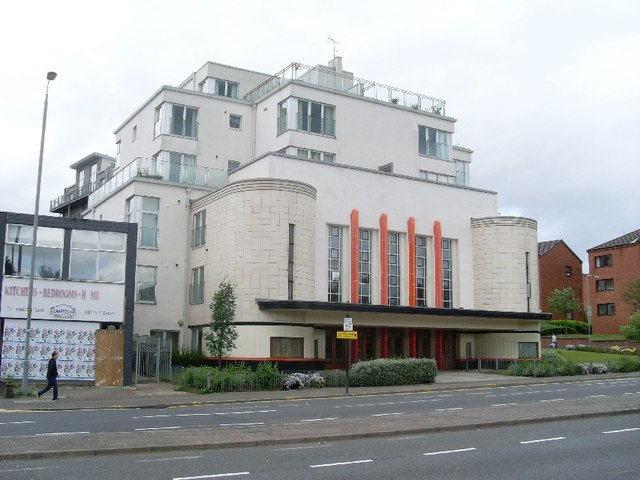
Ascot Cinema, converted into flats in 2002

Its collection of small shops is located near Anniesland railway station, on the Argyle, North Clyde and Maryhill lines, which provides frequent links with the centre of the city. The main road is also a significant bus route to the city centre. A large public house/restaurant sits to the east of the Cross, on the opposite side of the road from the district's former cinema which was converted into residential apartments in the early 21st century.

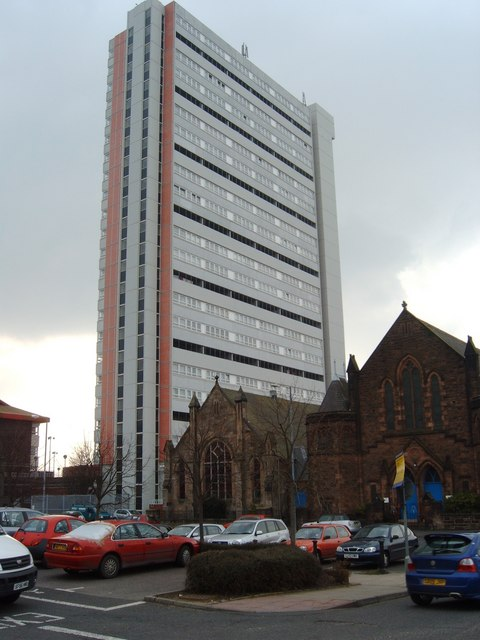
Anniesland Court, the tallest Category A listed building in Scotland

Set back from the north of Great Western Road is a small retail park consisting of a large Morrisons supermarket (formerly a Safeway "megastore"), as well as branches of The Gym Group and Costa Coffee and a Lidl supermarket. The retail park was formerly the site of the Barr and Stroud optics works, which moved to Govan under the ownership of Thales Optronics. The retail park, the public library and the local church are adjacent to Anniesland Court, Scotland's tallest listed building.

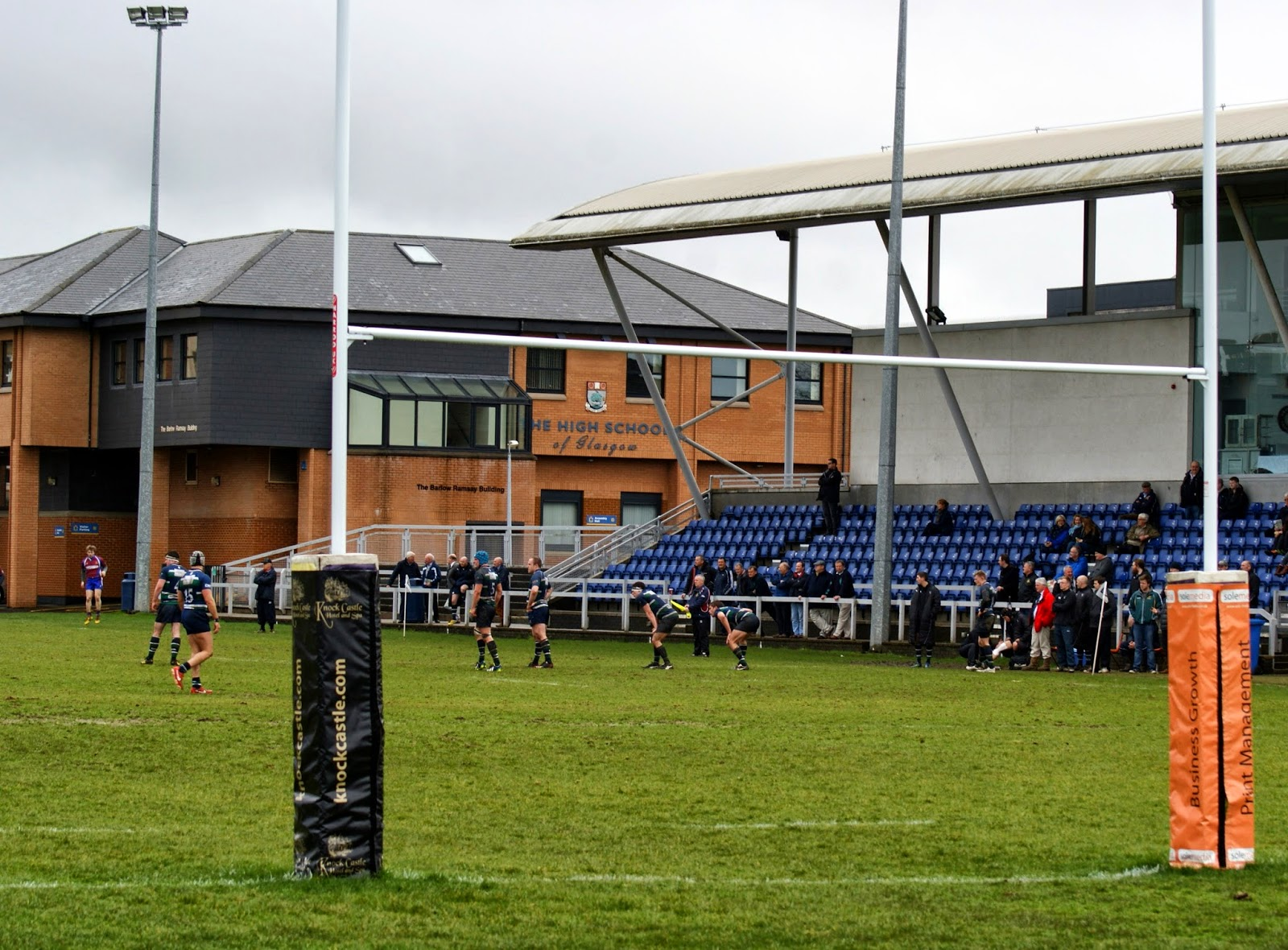
Old Anniesland rugby ground, owned by The High School of Glasgow

The senior buildings of the independent High School of Glasgow, which had various facilities around the city since the 12th century, have been in the area since 1977, along with the institution's extensive sports grounds (including the Old Anniesland rugby ground which is the home of amateur team GHK). This is adjacent to the sports grounds of the Glasgow Academy which also incorporates a rugby ground, New Anniesland, home to Glasgow Academicals; however that school itself is based a few miles to the east at Kelvinbridge. The playing fields have been used for that purpose since the 1880s, reflecting the area's semi-rural character on the periphery of the Glasgow urban area in that era, a situation which changed in the 1930s when the extensive Knightswood residential development was established further west.

Knightswood Secondary School and the Anniesland Campus of Glasgow Clyde College (formerly the separate Anniesland College) are within walking distance of the Cross and train station, while the Gartnavel Hospitals are also fairly close to the east, as are the Balgray playing fields, also owned by a private school (Kelvinside Academy), which in 2018 became the home of the home of semi-professional rugby team Glasgow Hawks. A further rugby ground, Hughenden (home of Hillhead Jordanhill and once of Glasgow Warriors) is just beyond Balgray, in the Hyndland neighbourhood.
