= Kelvindale railway station =

Railway station in Glasgow, Scotland

Kelvindale Scottish Gaelic: Dail Cheilbhinn
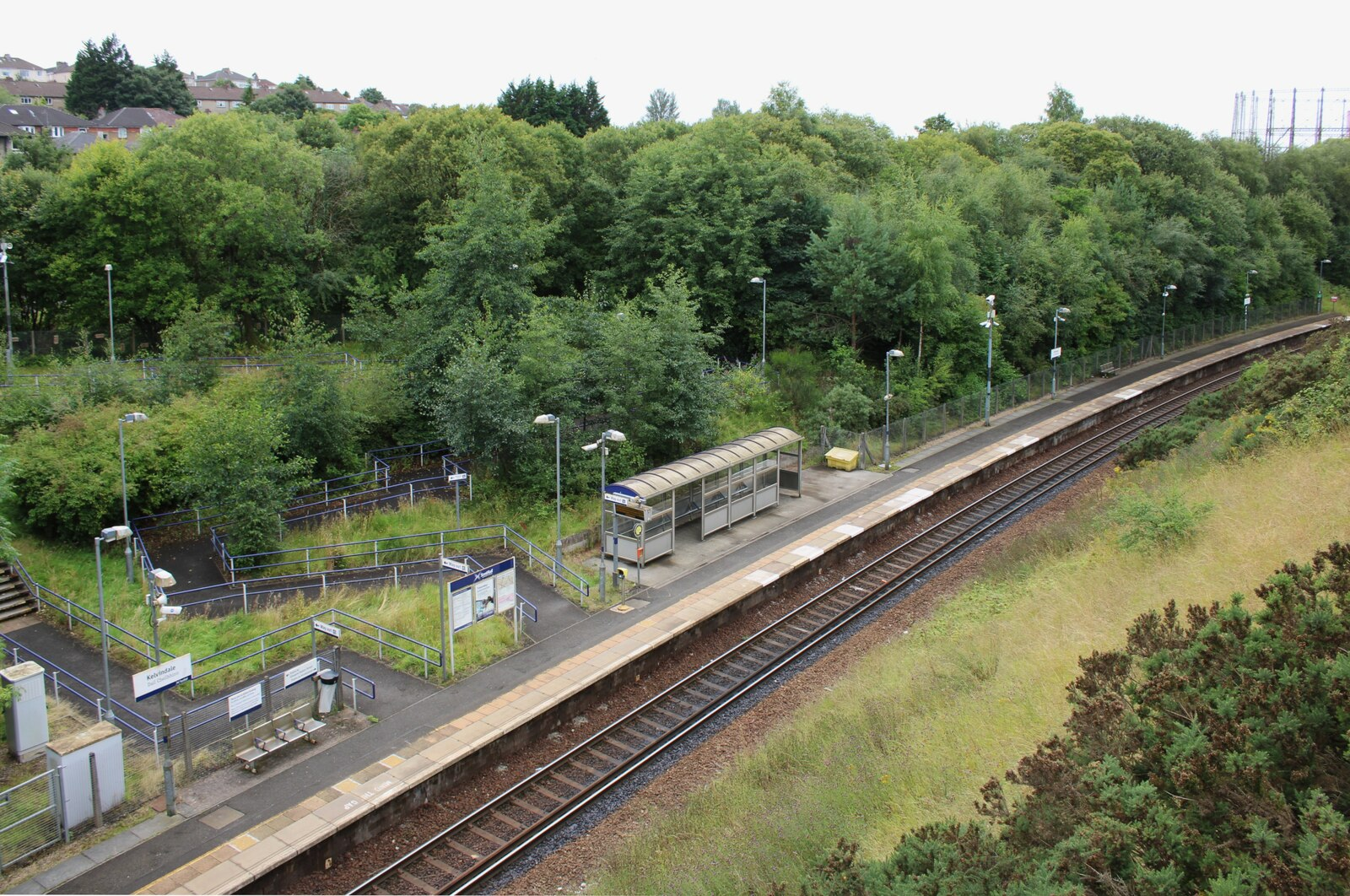

General information
- Location: Kelvindale, Glasgow; Scotland
- Coordinates: 55.8934°N 4.3105°W
- Grid reference: NS556691
- Manager: ScotRail
- Transit authority: SPT
- Platforms: 1

Other information
- Station code: KVD

Key dates
- 26 September 2005: Opened

Passengers
- 2021/22: ▲37,072
- 2022/23: ▲45,580
- 2023/24: ▲60,666
- 2024/25: ▼58,426
- 2025/26: ▲61,050
Location
Notes
- Passenger statistics from the Office of Rail and Road

Kelvindale railway station is a railway station that serves the Kelvindale suburb of Glasgow, Scotland. It was opened on 26 September 2005 by Bill Butler, the then Member of Parliament in the Scottish Parliament and Councillor Alistair Watson. A bronze plaque records the event. The station is 5 1/2 miles (8.9 km) north of Glasgow Queen Street on the Maryhill Line.

Services are provided by ScotRail as part of the SPT network.

== History ==
The line through here was opened by the North British Railway company in 1874 on its route from Maryhill to Queens Dock, on the northern bank of the River Clyde (the Stobcross Railway) but the station itself is on a new site, the line having originally been built for freight traffic. Passenger services were eventually introduced by the NBR in 1887, but these ceased in 1903. Freight to the docks ended in 1968, but the route was still regularly used for freight access to various goods depots, shipyards & engineering plants (plus occasional passenger diversions) until 1980, when a signal box fire put the junction at Maryhill Park out of use and eventually led to the closure of the line between Maryhill & Anniesland.

The track was lifted in 1987/8, but the formation was kept intact and this made the eventual reinstatement of the line as part of the Larkhall branch reopening project in 2005. Reopening the connection meant that Maryhill Line services no longer had to run empty to Knightswood North Junction (near Westerton) to reverse before returning to Queen Street, freeing up capacity for the extra trains serving the new line to Larkhall to run through Westerton and onwards to Milngavie. A station to serve the Kelvindale & Dawsholm area was proposed by SPT as part of the scheme (the station was originally to be called Dawsholm, but later changed to its present name) – though it wasn't ready in time for the reopening of the 1 mile (1.6 km) branch in April 2005, services subsequently began calling later that year.

== Service ==
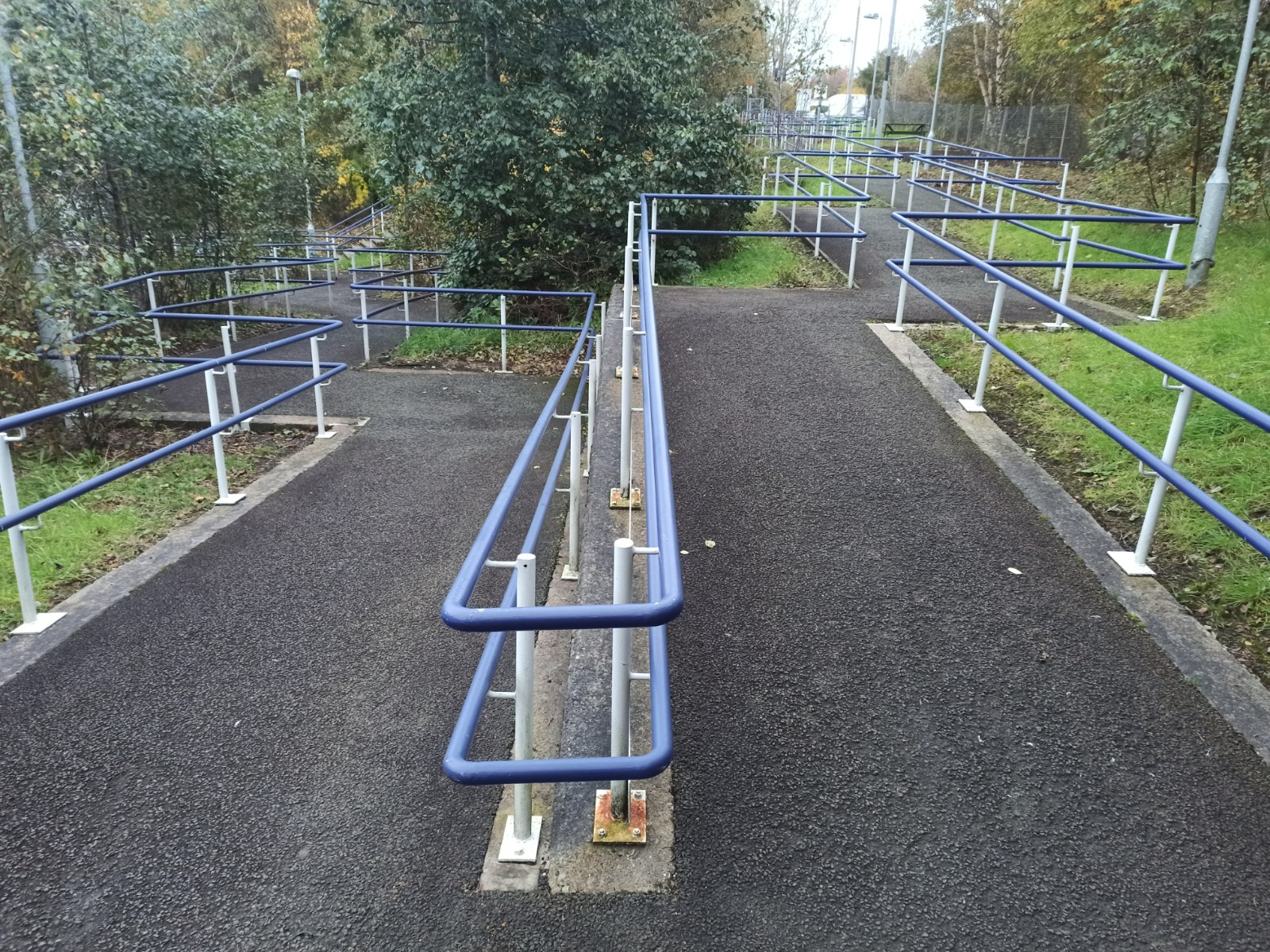
The ramps at Kelvindale

Monday to Saturdays there is a half-hourly service northbound to Glasgow Queen Street and southbound to Anniesland.

With the timetable revision starting on 18 May 2014, a limited hourly Sunday service now operates on this route.

| Preceding station | National Rail | Following station |
|---|---|---|
| Maryhill | ScotRail; Maryhill Line | Anniesland |
