= Maryhill railway station =

Railway station in Glasgow, Scotland

Maryhill Scottish Gaelic: Cnoc Màiri
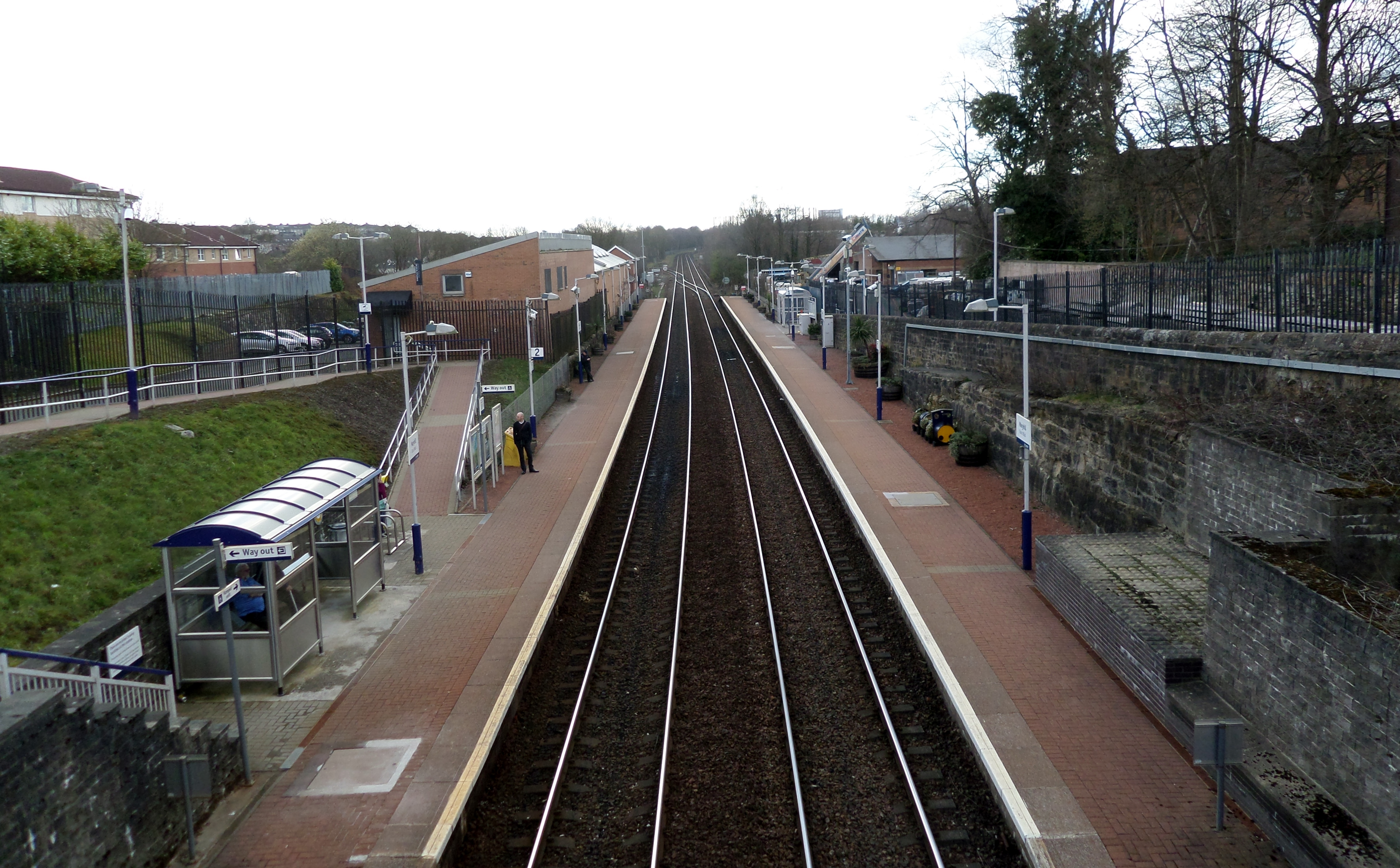
- Maryhill station, looking west

General information
- Location: Maryhill, Glasgow; Scotland
- Coordinates: 55.8974°N 4.3016°W
- Grid reference: NS561695
- Manager: ScotRail
- Transit authority: SPT
- Platforms: 2

Other information
- Station code: MYH

History
- Original company: Glasgow, Dumbarton and Helensburgh Railway
- Pre-grouping: North British Railway
- Post-grouping: London and North Eastern Railway; British Rail

Key dates
- 28 May 1858: Opened as Maryhill
- 2 October 1951: Closed to passengers
- 19 December 1960: Reopened as Maryhill Park
- 2 October 1961: Closed to regular passenger trains
- 2 March 1964: Closed for all traffic
- 6 December 1993: Reopened as Maryhill

Passengers
- 2021/22: ▲44,030
- 2022/23: ▲60,230
- 2023/24: ▲85,170
- 2024/25: ▲85,594
- 2025/26: ▲0.101 million
Location
Notes
- Passenger statistics from the Office of Rail and Road

Maryhill railway station is a railway station serving the Maryhill area of Glasgow, Scotland. It is located on the Maryhill Line, 4 3/4 miles (7.6 km) northwest of Glasgow Queen Street, a short distance east of Maryhill Viaduct and Maryhill Park Junction. It has two side platforms. Services are provided by ScotRail on behalf of Strathclyde Partnership for Transport.

== History ==
Maryhill was previously the terminus for the eponymous line when it was reopened by British Rail in 1993 - the original 1858 Glasgow, Dumbarton and Helensburgh Railway "Maryhill Park" station on the same site (also the junction for the former Kelvin Valley Railway and the Stobcross Railway to Partickhill & Queens Dock) had been closed back in October 1961 by the British Transport Commission although some workmen's trains continued until 1964 after which it was subsequently demolished.

The station was one of five opened by British Rail on 2 December 1993 at Maryhill, Summerston, Lambhill, Possilpark & Parkhouse and Ashfield at a cost of £2.2m (equivalent to £4,730,000 in 2025).

Since 2005 the service has extended to Kelvindale and Anniesland to connect with the North Clyde and Argyle Lines using a reinstated section of the former Stobcross Railway line that had previously been disused since 1980 (when the signal box that formerly controlled the junction was seriously damaged by fire) and then subsequently closed & dismantled. This extension was built to remove the need for terminating services from Queen Street to run empty through to Knightswood North Junction near Westerton in order to reverse before returning to Glasgow - a process that occupied the busy junction there for several minutes whilst the driver changed ends and crossed over from one track to the other. Ending this procedure allowed more trains on the North Clyde Line to pass through the junction, freeing up paths for services from the rebuilt branch line to Larkhall on the south side of the city to run via the Argyle Line through to Milngavie.

== Services ==
Monday to Saturdays, there is a half-hourly service eastbound to Glasgow Queen Street and westbound to Anniesland.

With the timetable revision starting on 18 May 2014, a limited hourly Sunday service now operates on this route.

Preceding station	National Rail	Following station
Summerston	ScotRail; Maryhill Line	Kelvindale
	Historical railways	
Lochburn	Glasgow, Dumbarton and Helensburgh Railway; North British Railway	Westerton
Summerston (old)	Kelvin Valley Railway; North British Railway	Terminus
Terminus	Stobcross Railway; North British Railway	Anniesland
