= Possil railway station =

Former railway station in Scotland

Possil
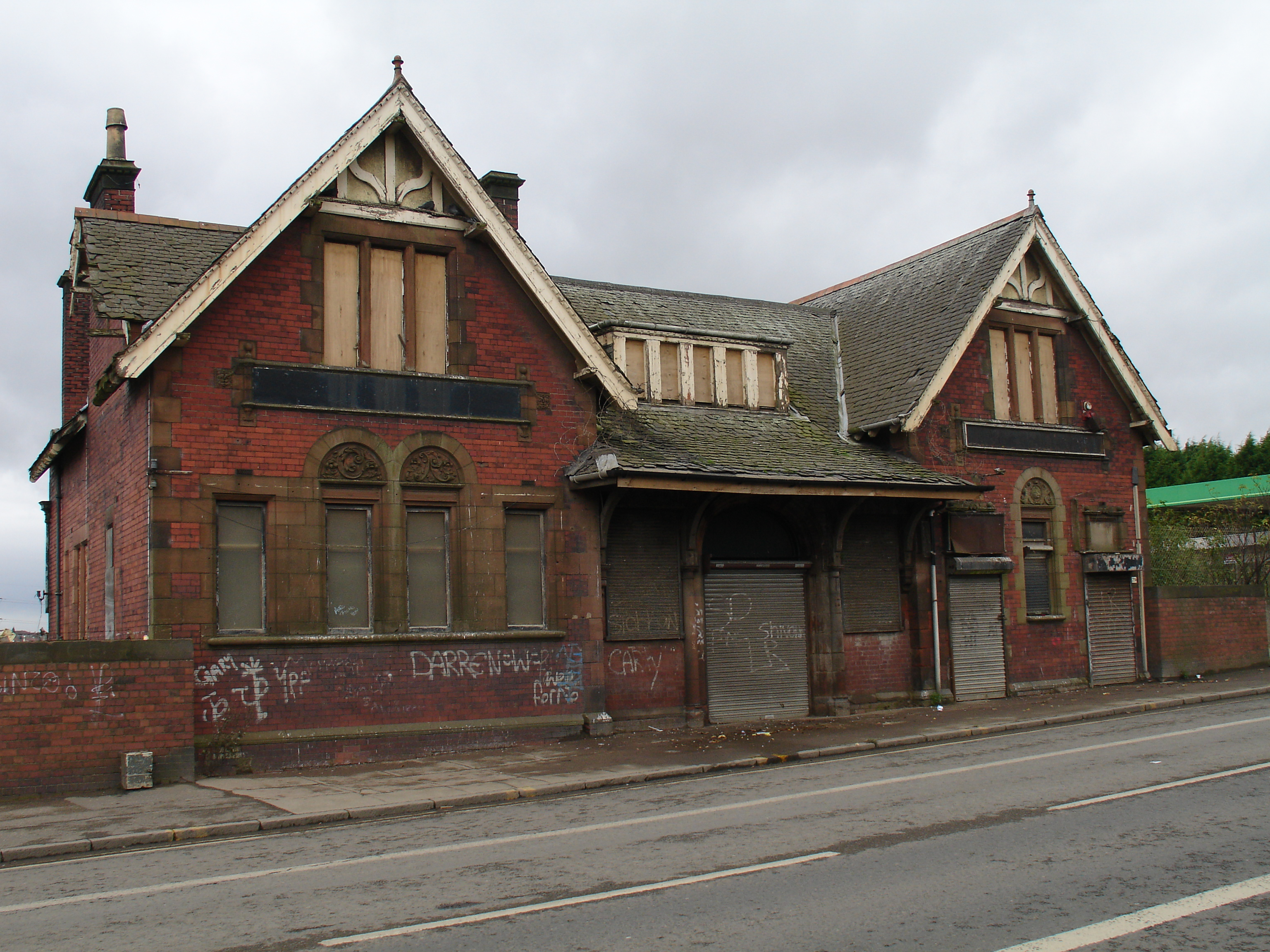
- Possil Station in 2007

General information
- Location: Possilpark, Glasgow; Scotland
- Coordinates: 55.89203°N 4.25996°W
- Platforms: 3

Other information
- Status: Disused

History
- Original company: Lanarkshire and Dunbartonshire Railway
- Pre-grouping: Caledonian Railway
- Post-grouping: LMS

Key dates
- 1 February 1897: Opened
- 1 May 1908: Closed
- 8 January 1934: Reopened
- January 1954: Renamed Possil North
- 5 October 1964: Closed
Location

Possil railway station was situated on Balmore Road, in the north of Glasgow, Scotland and served the Possilpark and Parkhouse areas of the city.

== History ==
Part of the Lanarkshire and Dunbartonshire Railway, it served as the terminus for passenger services, but allowed for through services for the transport of freight. Services ran from Rutherglen to Possil, via Glasgow Central Railway.

There was a goods yard at the site of the station, which was closed as part of the Beeching Axe. A scrapyard now occupies the site, although the station building and goods shed are still standing. The building has a slightly similar design to the now extinct Botanic Gardens structure on the Glasgow Central Railway. It has the company monogram "CR" carved in the stone above the two windows on the building's left frontal facade. It was in use as a bookmakers for many years in the 80s and 90s but by 2006, it was empty and falling into disrepair. It is now protected as a category C(S) listed building.

In 2025, campaigner and DJ Andrew Moore launched a public petition calling for the restoration of the station, following reports highlighting concerns about the buildings deteriorating condition.

In 2026, reports indicated that the former station building had become ownerless following the dissolution of its previous ownership structure. Under Scots law, ownerless property passes to the Crown as bona vacantia, administered by the King’s and Lord Treasurer’s Remembrancer. Media reports suggested that the building could potentially be acquired through Scotland’s ownerless property transfer process for a nominal sum.

Preceding station	Historical railways	Following station
Maryhill Central; Line and station closed	Caledonian Railway; Lanarkshire and Dunbartonshire Railway	Terminus
Terminus	Caledonian Railway; Hamiltonhill Branch	Springburn Park Goods; Line and station closed

== Gallery ==
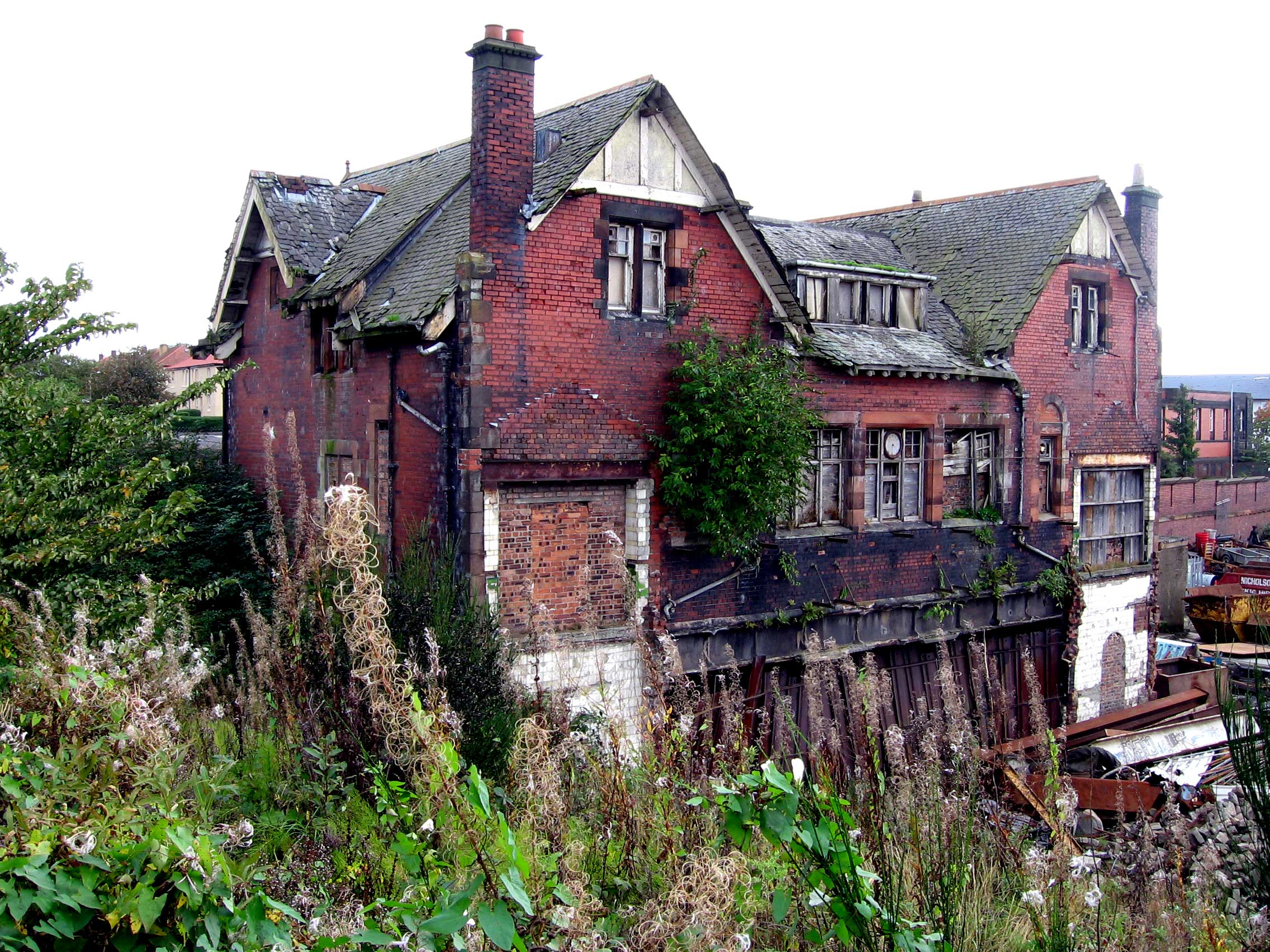
Looking east towards Possil Station in 2006

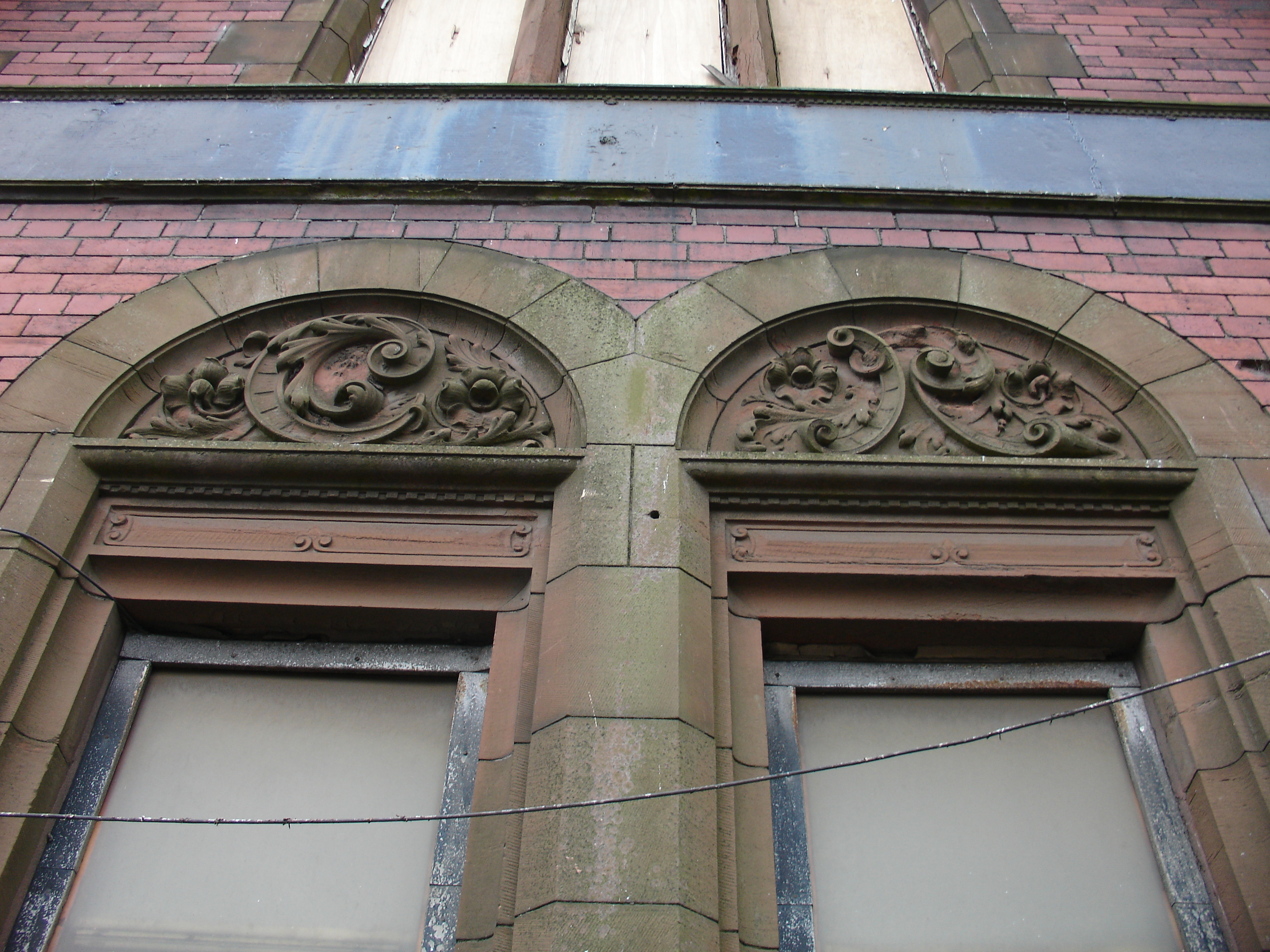
Stonework detailing Caledonian Railway ownership

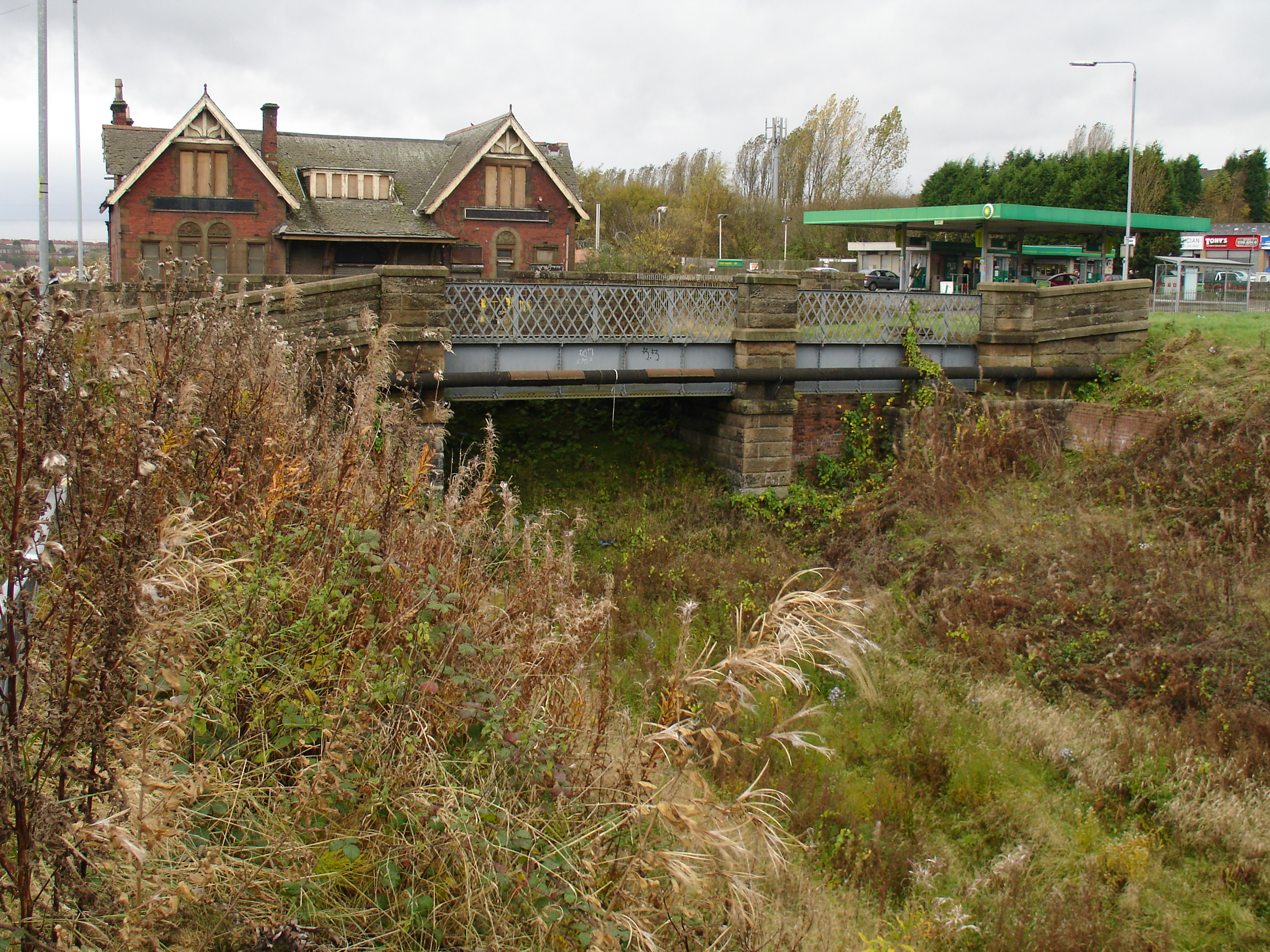
Looking west towards Possil Station in 2007

== See also ==
- Possilpark and Parkhouse railway station
- Vogue Cinema Possilpark
