= Lambhill =

Coordinates: 55.8932°N 4.2659°W

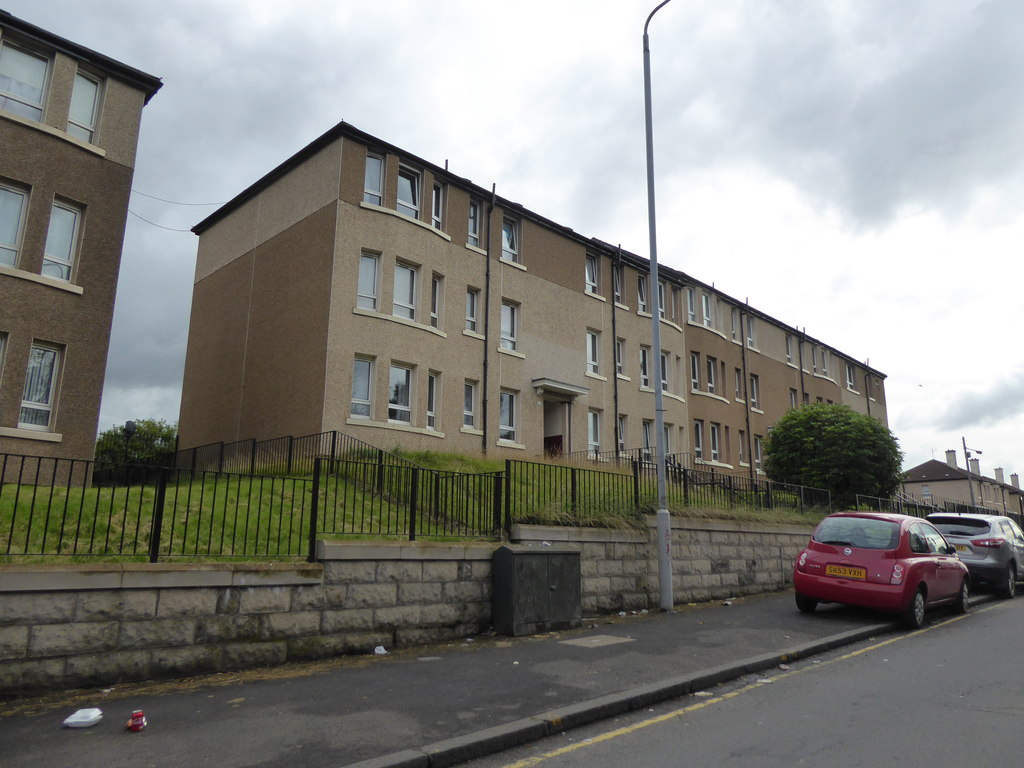
- Tenement flats in Lambhill

- Location within Glasgow
- OS grid reference: NS584690
- Community council: Lambhill and District
- Council area: Glasgow City Council
- Lieutenancy area: Glasgow
- Country: Scotland
- Sovereign state: United Kingdom
- Post town: GLASGOW
- Postcode district: G22 6
- Dialling code: 0141
- Police: Scotland
- Fire: Scottish
- Ambulance: Scottish
- UK Parliament: Glasgow North East
- Scottish Parliament: Glasgow Maryhill and Springburn

Lambhill is an area in the city of Glasgow, Scotland. It is situated north of the River Clyde, approximately 2 miles (3.2 km) north of the city centre.

Lambhill is a mainly residential area comprising both council and private housing. Residents are of a mixed age group. Lambhill has been in existence since the middle 18th Century, the original settlement probably coming from the north bank of the Forth and Clyde Canal (known as the Shangi, after a sailing captain who mentioned that the settlement reminded him of Shanghai). Many working men were employed in the nearby mine in Cadder. In nearby Lambhill Cemetery there is a memorial to the Cadder Pit disaster of 3 August 1913, which claimed 22 lives. The funeral service for the disaster was held in St Agnes Church on Balmore Road. Benny Lynch the great Glasgow boxer also is buried in Lambhill Cemetery which is bordered by Western Necropolis.

Hillend Road would appear to be one of the earliest streets to be built and the houses are of mixed vintage and build. The tenements are probably the oldest. At one time the Lord Provost of Glasgow David Hodge stayed in this street, as did John Logie Baird who took lodgings there. At the top of Hillend Road there is a golf course which is bordered by Ruchill on the opposite side. There are also numerous abandoned railway tunnels which would appear to link to the abandoned Botanic Gardens railway station. The Halloween Pen is a small tunnel which runs underneath the Forth and Clyde Canal and links Lambhill to Ruchill. Bordering the south side of Hillend Rd are the garden allotments. Near to the allotments, on Balmore Road, is the ticket office of a station for an abandoned railway line.
