= Maryhill Line =

Railway line in Glasgow, Scotland

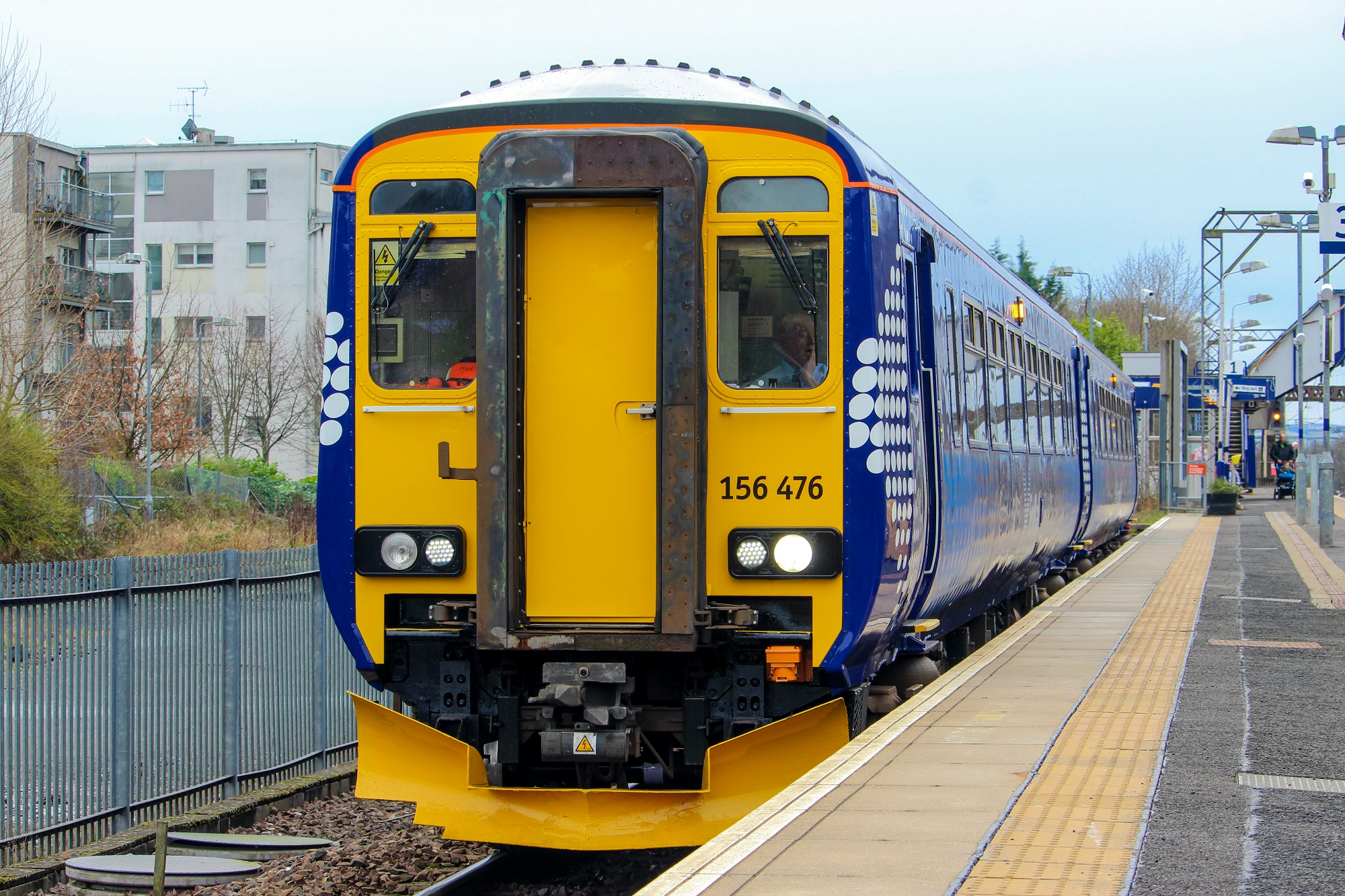
- A Class 156 at Anniesland, the outer terminus of the Maryhill Line

Overview
- Owner: Network Rail
- Locale: Glasgow; Scotland
- Stations: 7

Service
- System: National Rail
- Operator: ScotRail
- Rolling stock: Class 156, Class 158, Class 170

Technical
- Track gauge: 4 ft 8 1/2 in (1,435 mm)
Route map
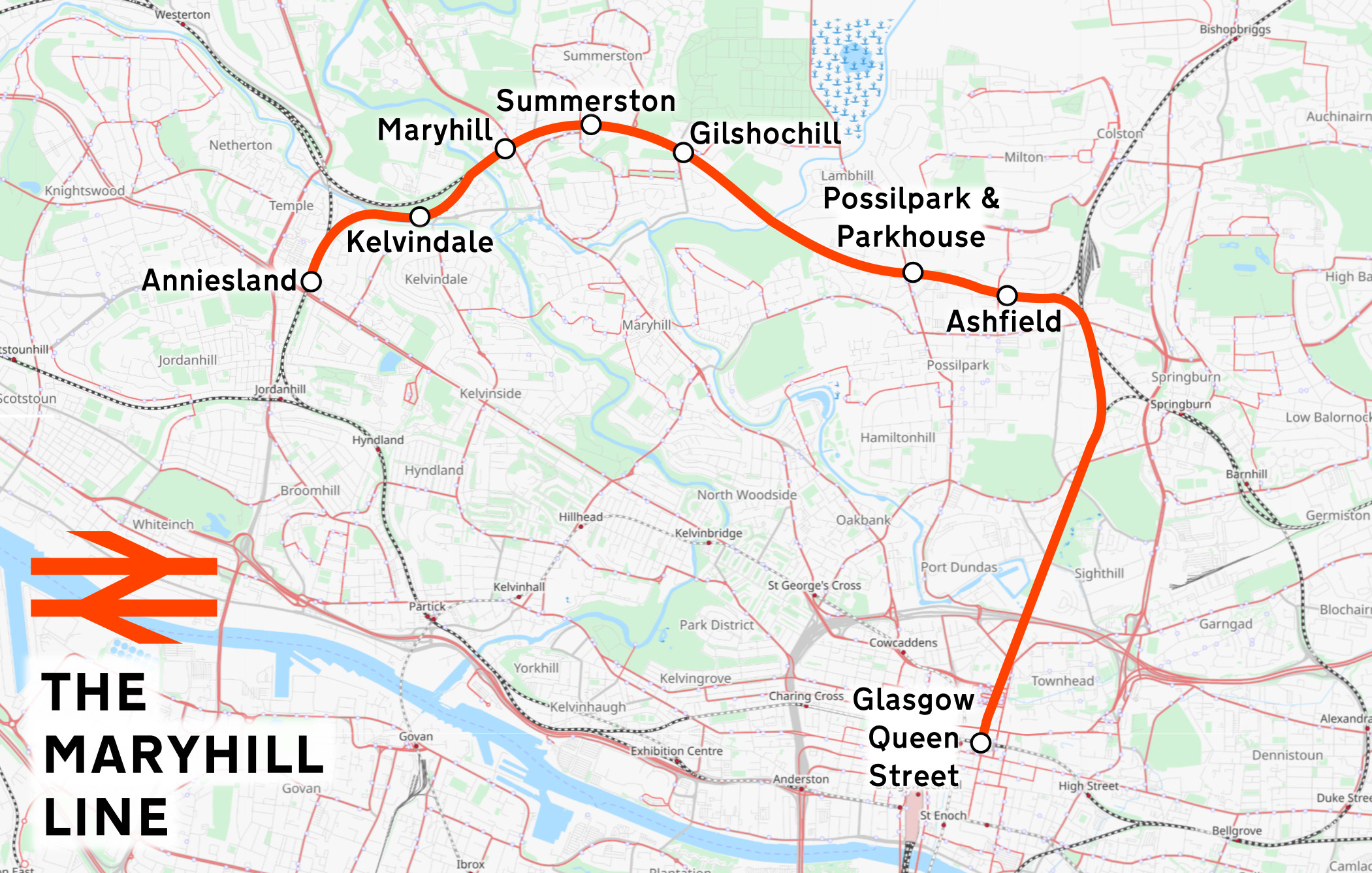
(Click to expand)

The Maryhill Line is a suburban railway line linking central Glasgow and Anniesland via Maryhill in Scotland. It is part of the Strathclyde Partnership for Transport network. The line between Glasgow and Maryhill forms a part of the West Highland Line (linking the WHL and North Clyde Line with the former Edinburgh and Glasgow Railway main line out of Glasgow Queen Street High Level) and was reopened to stopping passenger services in 1993. The line was reopened by British Rail and Strathclyde Passenger Transport Executive at a cost of £2.2m (equivalent to £4,730,000 in 2025).

Local services over the route had previously ended in the early 1960s, though it remained open thereafter for Fort William/Mallaig & Oban trains and freight traffic. In 2005 it was extended to Anniesland via a new station at Kelvindale in the north west of the city.

The route serves the following places:

- Glasgow Queen Street
- Ashfield
- Possilpark and Parkhouse
- Gilshochill railway station
- Summerston railway station
- Maryhill railway station
- Kelvindale railway station
- Anniesland railway station

== Historical routes ==
The Maryhill line runs on the formations of the following historic railways:

- Edinburgh and Glasgow Railway between Glasgow Queen Street and Cowlairs Junction
- Glasgow, Dumbarton and Helensburgh Railway between Cowlairs Junction and Maryhill Park Junction
- Stobcross Railway between Maryhill Park Junction and Anniesland

== Operations ==
Maryhill Line services connect with the Argyle and North Clyde Lines at Anniesland station, where the branch terminates in a bay platform built as part of the extension from Maryhill. Prior to 2005, trains terminating at Maryhill had to proceed empty to Knightswood North Junction (near Westerton, where the route joins the North Clyde suburban network) to reverse and change lines before returning to Glasgow. This procedure took several minutes (whilst the driver changed ends) and consequently restricted capacity at the busy junction – diverting the service to Anniesland freed up additional paths on the North Clyde route through there and allowed more trains to run between the south side of the city and the Milngavie branch. The connection from Maryhill junction to Westerton is used by Oban and Mallaig trains.

In 2015, a connection was installed between the Maryhill Line and the Glasgow-bound North Clyde Line at Anniesland, to act as a diversionary route into Glasgow Queen Street from Edinburgh and the North.

The line is not electrified, though there have been calls from various bodies and Glasgow MSPs to do so in recent years (as it is one of the few routes not included in plans for the future upgrading of the network on the north side of Glasgow), although in 2021 plans for it to be electrified were "watered down" by Network Rail. Passenger services are operated by ScotRail using Class 156, Class 158 and Class 170 diesel multiple units.

There has been a Sunday service on the line since 17 May 2014.
