= Anniesland railway station =

Railway station in Glasgow, Scotland

Anniesland Scottish Gaelic: Fearann Anna
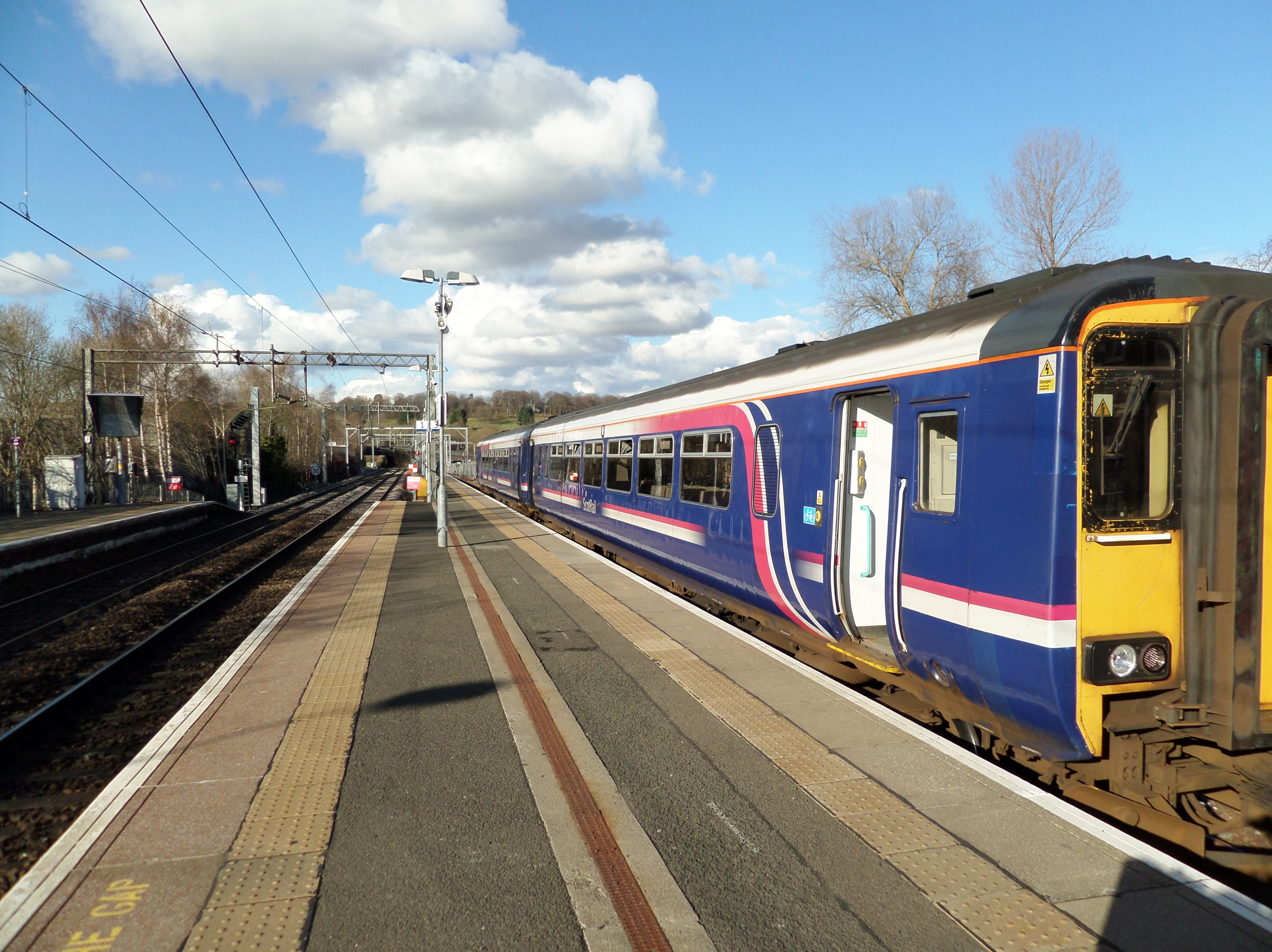
- Looking north with a Class 156 sitting in the Maryhill Line terminus platform on the right

General information
- Location: Anniesland, Glasgow, Scotland
- Coordinates: 55.8898°N 4.3217°W
- Grid reference: NS548687
- Manager: ScotRail
- Transit authority: SPT
- Platforms: 3

Other information
- Station code: ANL

History
- Original company: Stobcross Railway
- Pre-grouping: North British Railway
- Post-grouping: London and North Eastern Railway

Key dates
- 20 October 1874: Station opened as Great Western Road
- 9 January 1931: Station renamed Anniesland

Passengers
- 2021/22: ▲0.565 million
- 2022/23: ▲0.735 million
- 2023/24: ▲0.936 million
- 2024/25: ▲1.013 million
- 2025/26: ▲1.083 million
Location
Notes
- Passenger statistics from the Office of Rail and Road

Anniesland railway station serves the Anniesland suburb of Glasgow, Scotland. It is located on the Argyle Line, 3 3/4 miles (6.0 km) west of Glasgow Central (Low Level), on the North Clyde Line 4 1/4 miles (6.8 km) west of Glasgow Queen Street (Low Level), and is the terminus of the Maryhill Line 6 1/4 miles (10.1 km) away from Glasgow Queen Street (High Level). The station is served by ScotRail, as part of the Strathclyde Partnership for Transport network.

== History ==
Originally called Great Western Road, the station was opened by the North British Railway in 1874 on their route linking the Glasgow, Dumbarton and Helensburgh Railway at Maryhill to Queens Dock. The site is now occupied by the Scottish Exhibition Centre, on the north side of the River Clyde (the Stobcross Railway). It became part of the London and North Eastern Railway during the Grouping of 1923. The station then passed on to the Scottish Region of British Railways on nationalisation in 1948.

When sectorisation was introduced by British Rail in the 1980s, the station was served by ScotRail until the network's privatisation.

The line towards Westerton, which was opened some years after the Maryhill line in 1886 as part of the Glasgow City and District Railway, was electrified in 1960, along with the line southwards to Jordanhill and Hyndland during the North Clyde Line modernisation scheme. The chord from Maryhill, which was part of the original Stobcross Railway route, remains diesel operated. This chord was closed completely in 1985 and lifted three years later, after being disused since 1980; it was relaid and reopened in 2005, when the Maryhill Line was extended as part of the project to reopen the railway to Larkhall on the Argyle Line.

After the 2005 reopening, there had been no physical link between the two routes here; the single line from Maryhill Park Junction terminated in its own separate bay platform (no. 3) on the eastern side of the station and the two routes were under the control of different signalling centres. However, in late 2015, Network Rail carried out a programme of works to connect the Maryhill chord to the North Clyde Line, just north of Anniesland station. This was done to provide a diversionary route from the main Edinburgh to Glasgow line into Glasgow Queen Street Low Level while the High Level station was shut during 2016 for tunnel works; however, it is intended that the new connection be permanent.

In October 2024, new lifts were opened allowing the station to be accessed step-free.

== Services ==
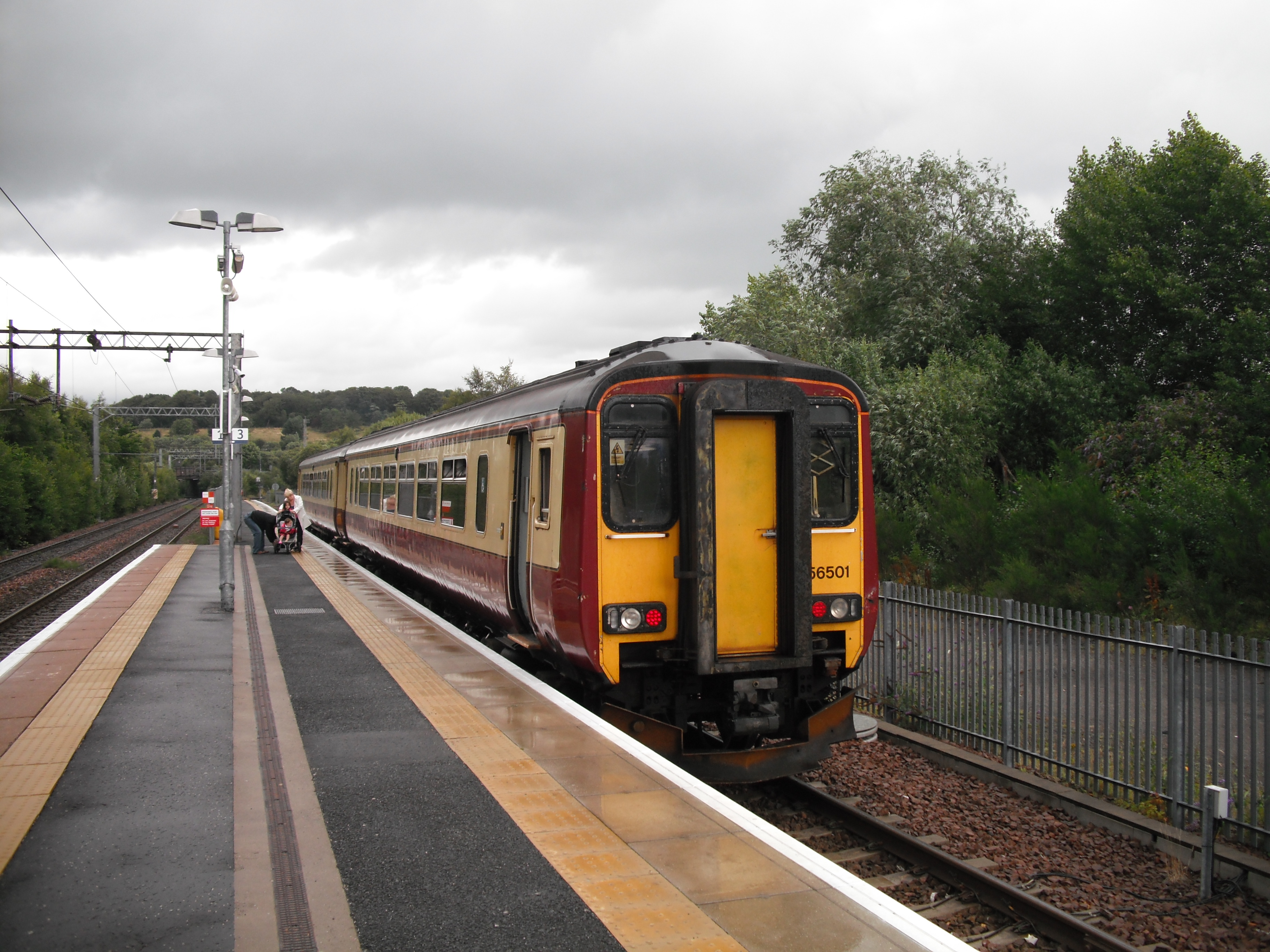
A Maryhill Line service

ScotRail operates the following typical weekday service, in trains per hour (tph):

- 1 tph to Glasgow Queen Street (Low Level).
- 2 tph to Airdrie, via Glasgow Queen Street
- 2 tph to Balloch, via Dumbarton Central
- 2 tph to Dalmuir
- 2 tph to Larkhall, via Glasgow Central
- 2 tph to Milngavie
- 2 tph to Springburn, via Glasgow Queen Street.

Preceding station	National Rail	Following station
Terminus	ScotRail; Maryhill Line	Kelvindale
Hyndland	ScotRail; Argyle Line	Westerton
Hyndland	ScotRail; North Clyde Line	Westerton
	Historical railways	
Partickhill	North British Railway; Stobcross Railway	Maryhill
connection to Stobcross railway	North British Railway; Glasgow City and District Railway	Westerton
Whiteinch Victoria Park	North British Railway; Whiteinch Railway	connection to Stobcross railway
Scotstounhill	North British Railway; Glasgow, Yoker and Clydebank Railway	connection to Stobcross railway
