= Falkirk Grahamston railway station =

Railway station in Falkirk, Scotland

Falkirk Grahamston Scottish Gaelic: Baile a' Ghreumaich
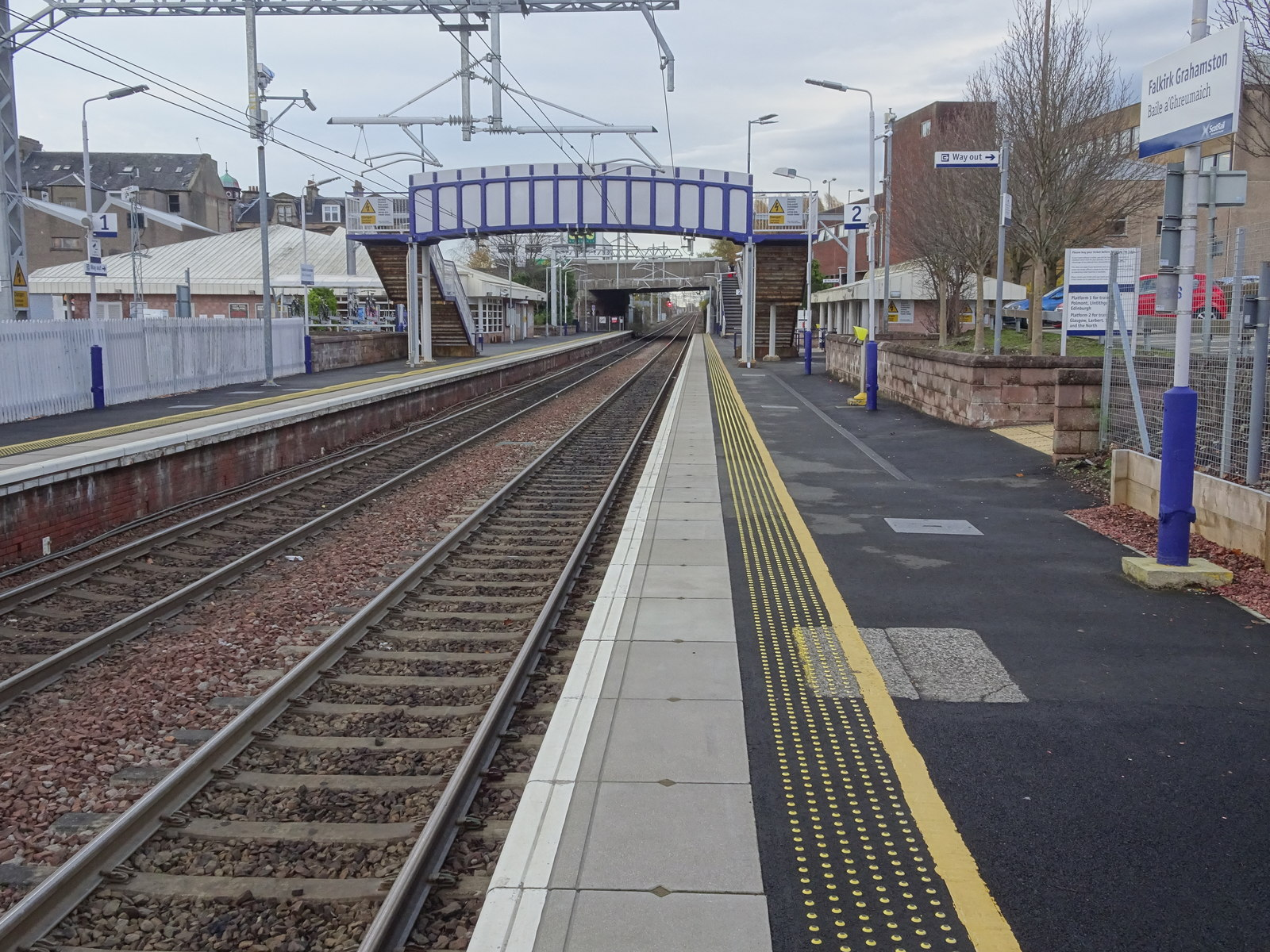
- Falkirk Grahamston station in 2018, following electrification

General information
- Location: Falkirk, Falkirk; Scotland
- Coordinates: 56.0024°N 3.7856°W
- Grid reference: NS887802
- Manager: ScotRail
- Platforms: 2

Other information
- Station code: FKG

History
- Original company: Stirlingshire Midland Junction Railway
- Pre-grouping: North British Railway
- Post-grouping: LNER

Key dates
- 1 October 1850: Opened as Grahamston (Falkirk)
- 1 February 1903: Renamed as Falkirk Grahamston

Passengers
- 2020/21: ▼92,364
- Interchange: ▼21,817
- 2021/22: ▲0.342 million
- Interchange: ▲0.126 million
- 2022/23: ▲0.489 million
- Interchange: ▼59,878
- 2023/24: ▲0.580 million
- Interchange: ▲0.108 million
- 2024/25: ▲0.612 million
- Interchange: ▲0.120 million
Location
Notes
- Passenger statistics from the Office of Rail and Road

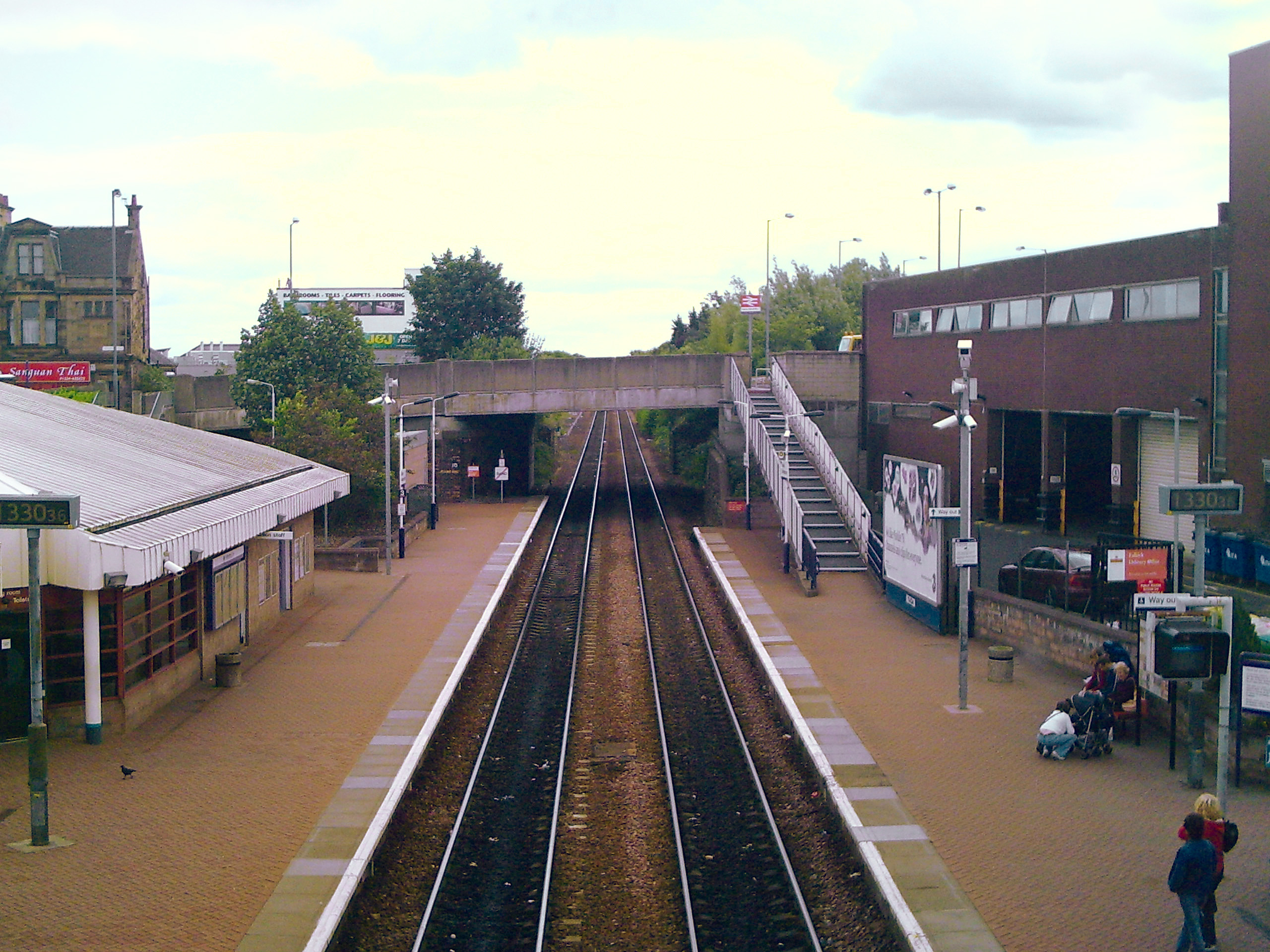
The view from the footbridge at Falkirk Grahamston, looking towards the east

Falkirk Grahamston railway station is one of three railway stations serving the town of Falkirk in Scotland. It is located on the Edinburgh to Dunblane Line and also the Cumbernauld Line. Train services are provided by ScotRail. The "Highland Chieftain", the daily London North Eastern Railway service from London King's Cross to Inverness and vice versa also calls here.

Falkirk is also served by two other railway stations: Falkirk High, and Camelon.

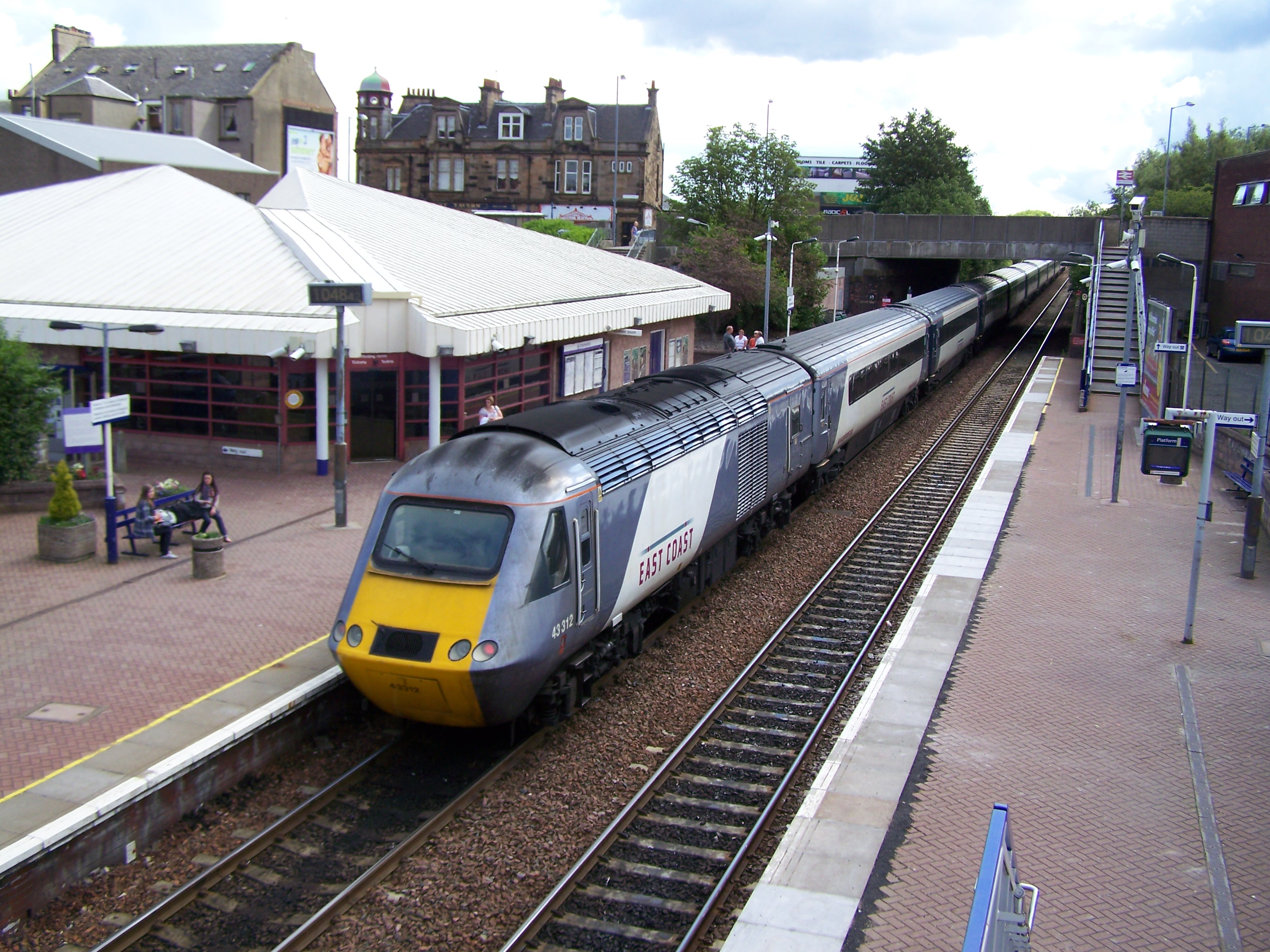
East Coast InterCity 125 departing Falkirk Grahamston with a southbound Highland Chieftain service to London King's Cross.

== History ==
The line between Polmont and Larbert was built by the Stirlingshire Midland Junction Railway, which was absorbed by the Edinburgh and Glasgow Railway prior to opening. The line opened on 1 October 1850, as did the station known as Grahamston (Falkirk). The subsequent addition of a chord line at Carmuirs to create a triangular junction there also gave access to the Scottish Central Railway and hence the E&G main line at Greenhill, creating a parallel relief route to the busy E&G line that was often used by local stopping trains between the two cities.

It also became the junction for the Grangemouth Railway, when the branch to the port of the same name on the Firth of Forth was opened in 1860/61 – this line was notable in that it was promoted and built by the Forth and Clyde Canal Company rather than any of the local railways, in order to maintain the F&CC's monopoly of the harbour there. The branch was initially worked by the E&G, but when the canal company was subsequently bought out by the Caledonian Railway, it passed into their hands; thereafter the E&G's successor the North British Railway had running powers over it. Passenger services there were withdrawn on 29 January 1968 as a result of the Beeching Axe, but the branch is still open for freight to the port and associated oil refinery and petrochemical plant.

The station was renamed Falkirk Grahamston on 1 February 1903. The original station buildings were replaced by the present ones in 1985/6., in December 2021, it was announced that this station will become a transport hub, under the name Falkirk Central, as it is located in central Falkirk, though not much information has been said since then.

== Services ==
Monday to Saturday there are 4 trains per hour to Edinburgh Waverley eastbound and 2-3 trains per hour westbound to Dunblane via Stirling. Train times to Edinburgh Waverley vary around 34 minutes. There are also 2 trains per hour to and from Glasgow Queen Street via Cumbernauld, with journey times from 39 minutes to 43 minutes. London Northern Eastern Railway operate one train per day to Inverness and one train per day to London King's Cross. Glasgow services were diverted via Cumbernauld (rather than their former routing via Croy) in September 1999 in order to free up paths on the busy E&G main line.

On Sundays there is an hourly service to Edinburgh and Dunblane but no service to Glasgow. Passengers wishing to travel there have to either change at Polmont or use Falkirk High.

Preceding station	National Rail	Following station
Haymarket	London North Eastern Railway; East Coast Main Line	Stirling
Polmont or Haymarket	ScotRail; Edinburgh–Dunblane Line	Camelon
Stirling	Caledonian Sleeper; Highland Caledonian Sleeper (southbound only)	Edinburgh
Camelon	ScotRail; Cumbernauld Line	Terminus
	Historical railways	
Camelon	Stirlingshire Midland Junction Railway; North British Railway	Polmont
Terminus	Grangemouth Railway; Caledonian Railway	Grangemouth

== Recent Improvements ==
The line through the station and onwards to Larbert/Cumbernauld and to Polmont was electrified in 2018 as part of the second phase of the Edinburgh to Glasgow Improvement Programme funded by Transport Scotland. This has resulted in a timetable recast, with a new Glasgow to Edinburgh via Cumbernauld & Falkirk Grahamston stopping service introduced and services to Edinburgh, Stirling & Dunblane accelerated.
