= Camelon =

Village in Falkirk, Scotland

Coordinates: 56.004596°N 3.817454°W

Camelon: Scottish Gaelic: Camalan; Scots: Caimlan
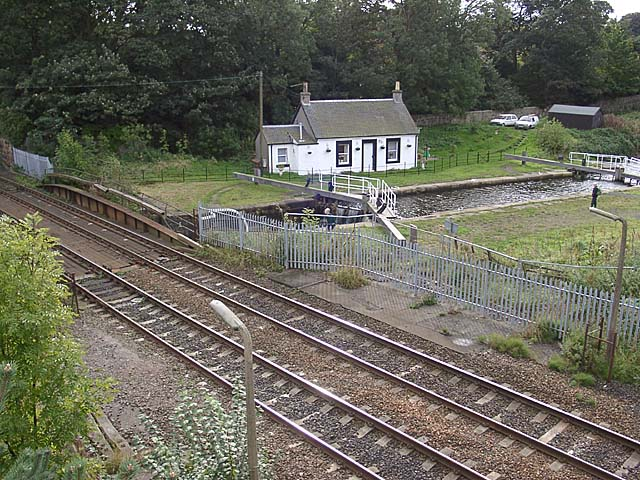
- Camelon swing bridge over the Forth and Clyde Canal at Camelon lock

- Location within the Falkirk council area
- Population: 4,508 (2001 census)
- OS grid reference: NS867805
  - Edinburgh: 24.7 mi (39.8 km) ESE
  - London: 346 mi (557 km) SSE
- Civil parish: Falkirk
- Council area: Falkirk
- Lieutenancy area: Stirling and Falkirk
- Country: Scotland
- Sovereign state: United Kingdom
- Post town: FALKIRK
- Postcode district: FK1
- Dialling code: 01324
- Police: Scotland
- Fire: Scottish
- Ambulance: Scottish
- UK Parliament: Falkirk
- Scottish Parliament: Falkirk West
- Website: falkirk.gov.uk

Camelon (/ˈkeɪmələn/; Scots: Caimlan, Scottish Gaelic: Camalan) is a village within the Falkirk council area, Scotland. The village is in the Forth Valley, 1 mile (1.6 km) west of Falkirk, 1 mile (1.6 km) south of Larbert and 3 miles (4.8 km) east of Bonnybridge. The main road through Camelon is the A803 road which links the village to Falkirk. At the time of the 2001 census, Camelon had a population of 4,508.

== History ==
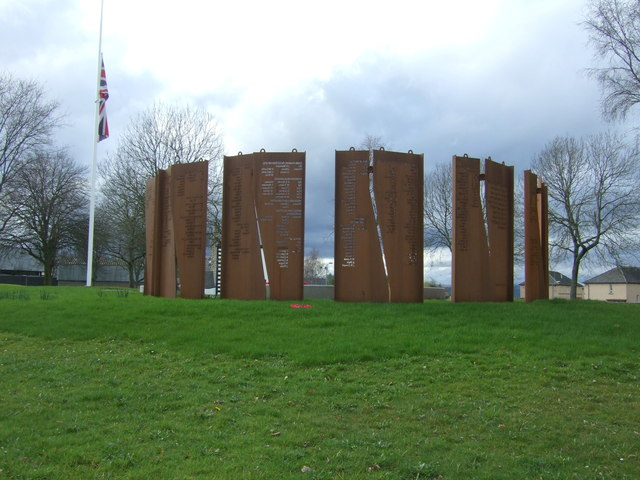
War Memorial – opened 23 April 2016

Human activity at Camelon pre-dates the Romans, as Bronze Age items have been recovered from graves in the area.

Camelon is the site of a series of Roman fortifications built between 80 and 83 AD. Camelon has been suggested as the southern fort of the Roman Gask Ridge separating the Highlands from the Lowlands.

The Roman fort was under a mile north of the Antonine Wall. A Roman altar was found at Bogton Farm under a kilometre west of the fort. A Samian ware platter, possibly also associated with the site was found, and can now be viewed at the Hunterian Museum, Glasgow.

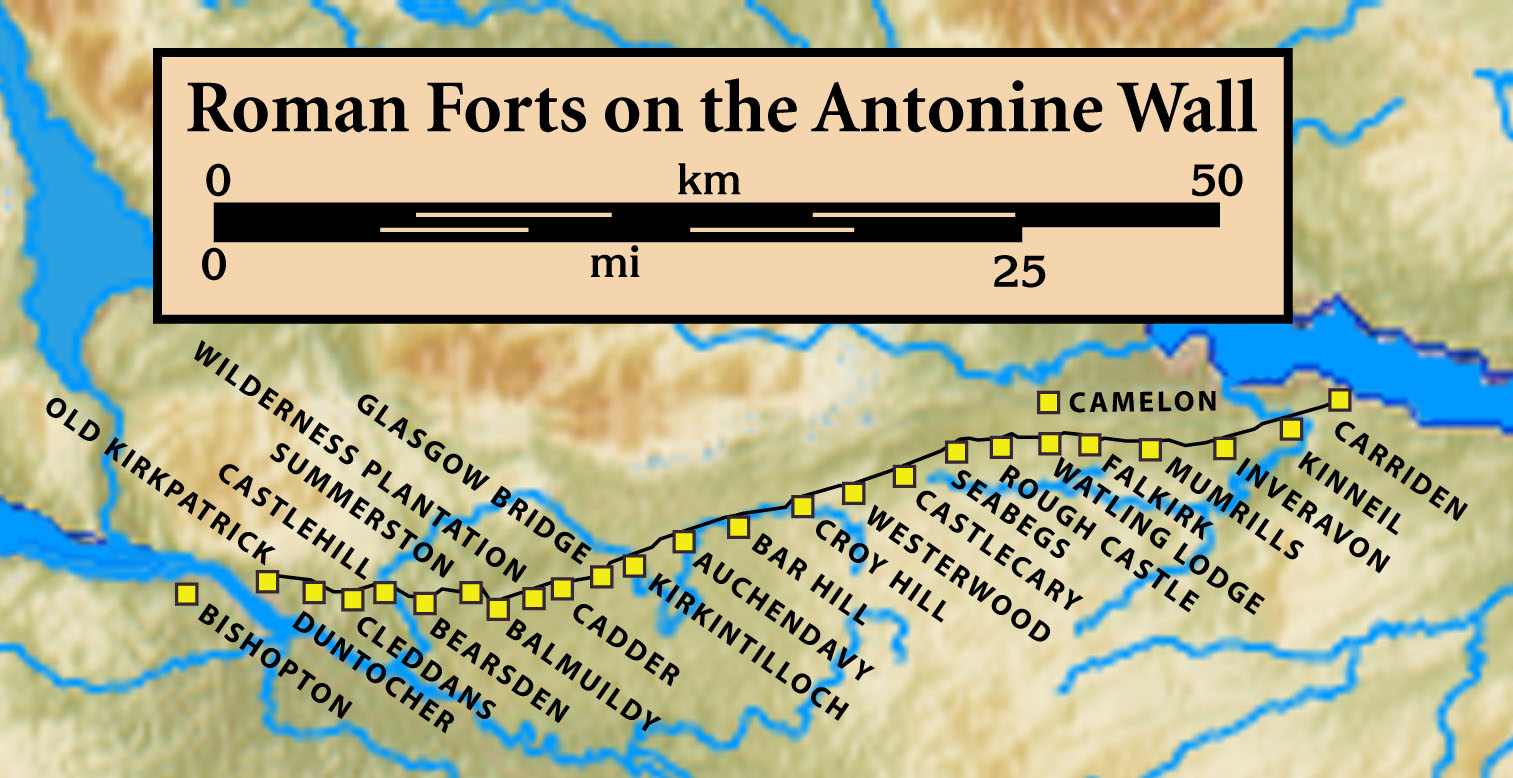
Forts and Fortlets associated with the Antonine Wall from west to east: Bishopton, Old Kilpatrick, Duntocher, Cleddans, Castlehill, Bearsden, Summerston, Balmuildy, Wilderness Plantation, Cadder, Glasgow Bridge, Kirkintilloch, Auchendavy, Bar Hill, Croy Hill, Westerwood, Castlecary, Seabegs, Rough Castle, Camelon, Watling Lodge, Falkirk, Mumrills, Inveravon, Kinneil, Carriden

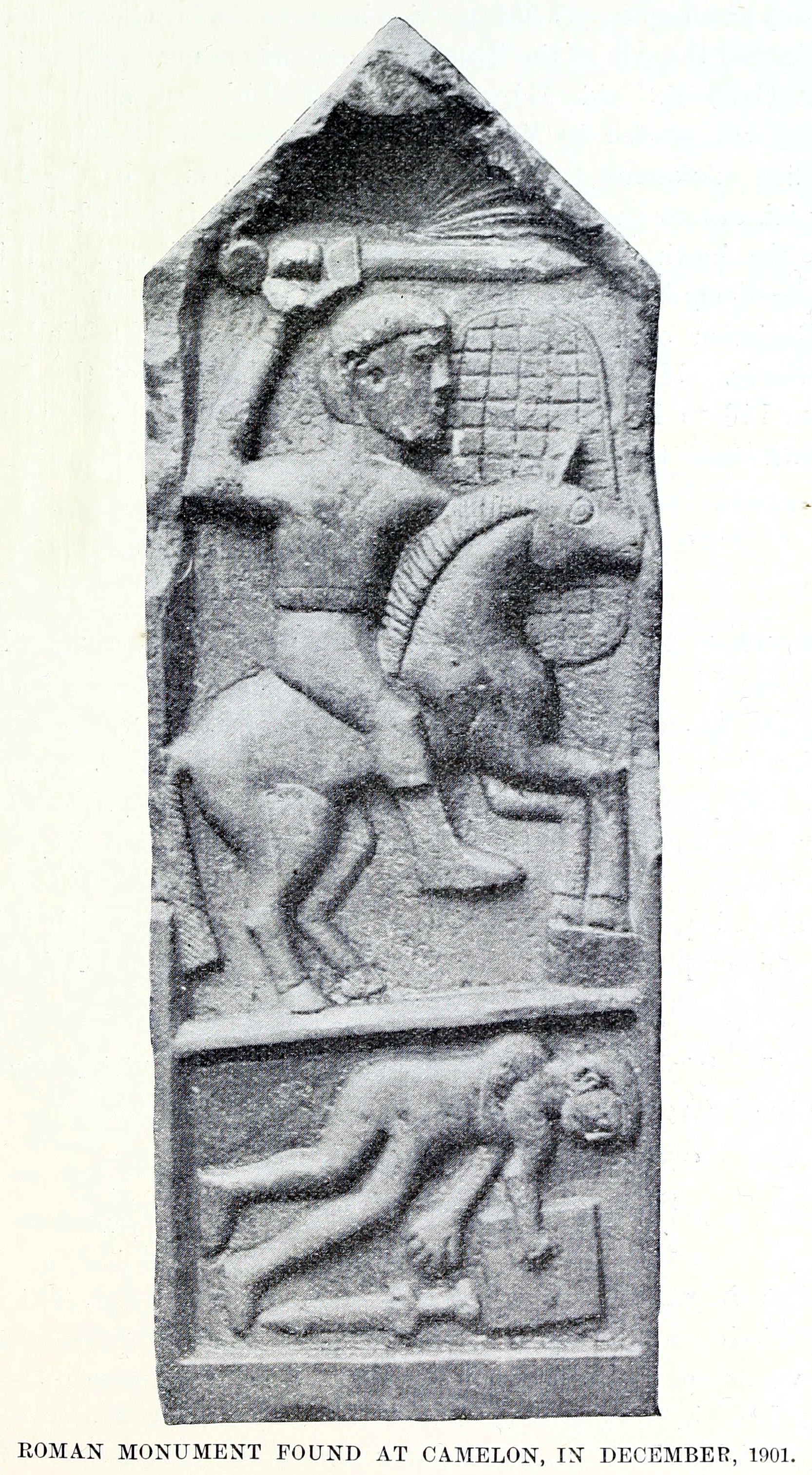
"Roman" Monument - believed to be a 19th-century forgery.

Camelon and its connections with Arthur's O'on have been mentioned in relation to Camelot, but the name 'Camelon' may be an antiquarian neologism coined after the 15th century, with its earlier name being Carmore or Carmure. Hector Boece was the first historian to mention Camelon in his Historia Gentis Scotorum of 1522. Vespasian was supposed to have won a battle at Camelon and captured the crown of the Pictish kings. Stories of a legendary Roman harbour at Camelon first appeared in 1695. The legend of Camelon's twelve brass gates was also widespread albeit dubious. More mundane items like leather shoes were found when Tesco's supermarket was being constructed.

Camelon developed when the canals were built in the 18th and 19th centuries. Much of the Forth and Clyde Canal opened in the 1770s over a decade after the Carron Iron Works were established. The Union Canal opened in 1822 and brought traffic from Edinburgh to Port Downie where the canals met. A couple of decades later saw the coming of the railways. In 1831 the village was described as having a population of 809, with 250 men and boys employed in nail making. Historical industries included nail making, a tar processing plant and other chemical works, a shipbuilding business near Lock Sixteen and a distillery at Rosebank. In the early 20th century W. Alexander & Sons set up a bus service and coachbuilders in Camelon. A flight of locks which joined the Union Canal with the Forth and Clyde Canal brought business to the village. This was replaced in 2002 with the Falkirk Wheel, a rotating boat lift.

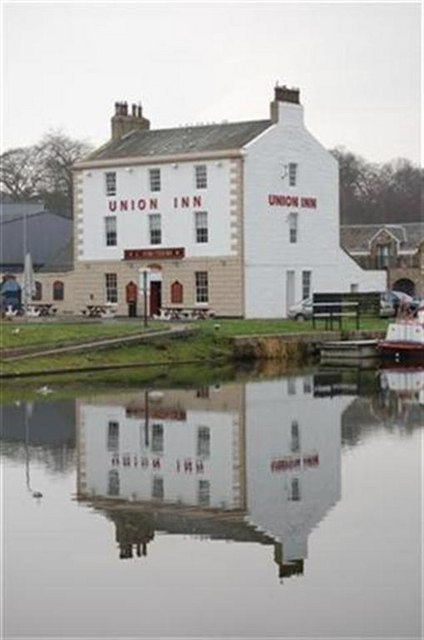
The Union Inn, named for the Union Canal, reflected in the canal

== Mariners ==
People from Camelon are known locally as Mariners, a nickname given to Camelon Juniors FC. The name is probably best remembered by the Mariner Leisure Centre and in Mariners' Day. Mariners' Day was an annual children's fayre held on the second Saturday in June. It included a parade and a crowning ceremony of the Queen along with fun and games for the children of Camelon.

== Transport ==
Camelon has good access for a village of its size with Camelon railway station lying on the Cumbernauld Line and the Edinburgh to Dunblane line. Next to the station there are amenities including the Mariner Leisure Centre. The main road through Camelon is the A803 road which provides access to Falkirk. Buses also run through Camelon, more commonly known as McGill's Bus Services under the brand Midland Bluebird.

== Sport ==
Camelon is home to the football club Camelon Juniors, who play at Carmuirs Park next to the Forth and Clyde Canal. The club was founded in 1920 and currently compete in the East of Scotland League Premier Division.

== See also ==
- List of places in Falkirk council area
