= Bridge of Allan railway station =

Railway station in Stirling, Scotland

Bridge of Allan Scottish Gaelic: Drochaid Ailein
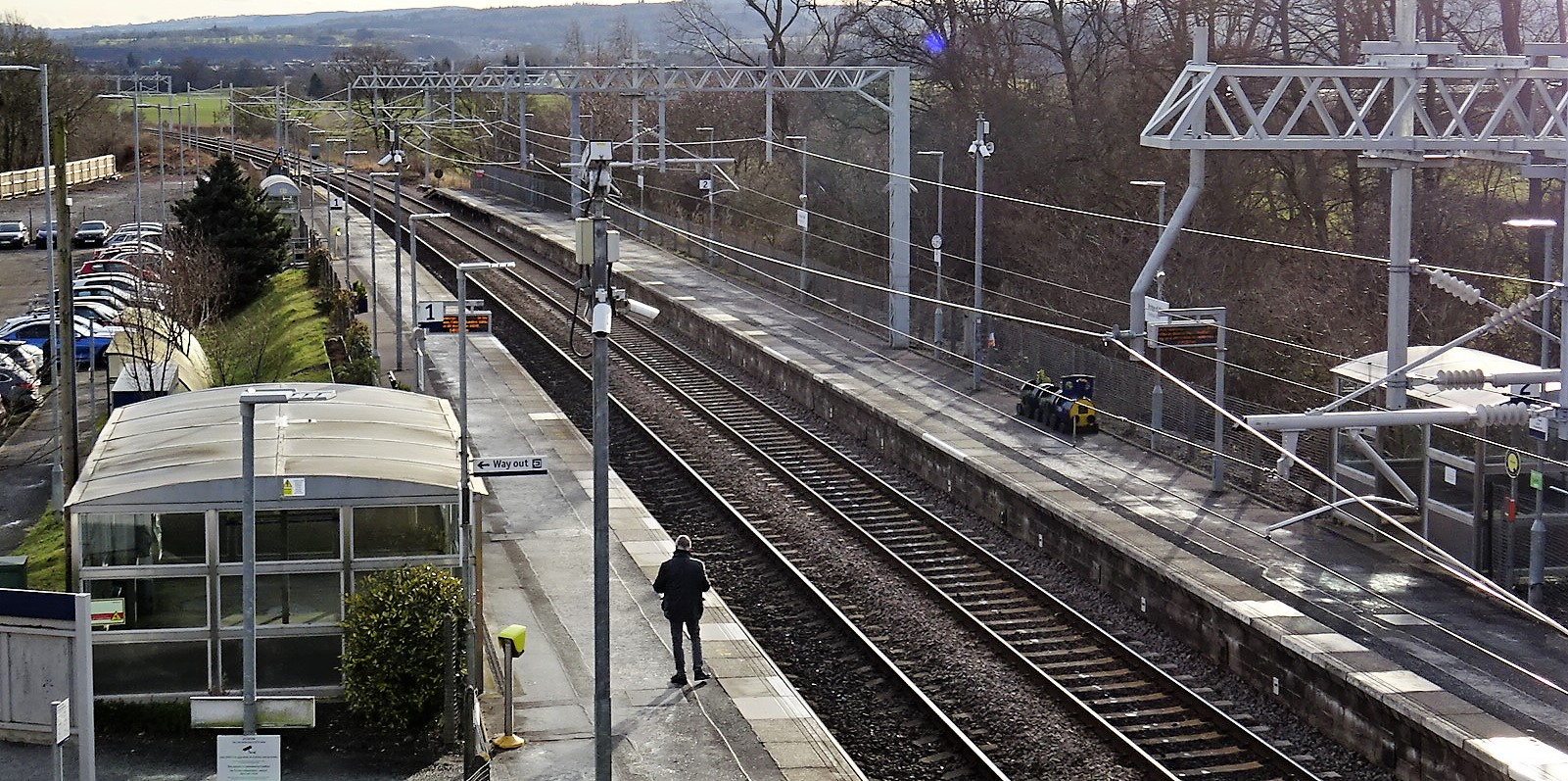
- The station after electrification, looking south towards Stirling

General information
- Location: Bridge of Allan, Stirling; Scotland
- Coordinates: 56.1566°N 3.9573°W
- Grid reference: NS785977
- Managed by: ScotRail
- Platforms: 2

Other information
- Station code: BEA

History
- Original company: Scottish Central Railway
- Pre-grouping: Caledonian Railway
- Post-grouping: LMS

Key dates
- 22 May 1848: Original station opened
- 1 November 1965: Original station closed to passengers
- 13 May 1985: New station opened to the south of the original site

Passengers
- 2020/21: ▼42,486
- 2021/22: ▲0.136 million
- 2022/23: ▲0.193 million
- 2023/24: ▲0.267 million
- 2024/25: ▲0.268 million
Location
Notes
- Passenger statistics from the Office of Rail and Road

Bridge of Allan railway station is a railway station located in the town of Bridge of Allan, north of Stirling, Scotland. It lies between Stirling and Dunblane on the Highland Main Line, Glasgow–Aberdeen line and Edinburgh–Dunblane line.

== History ==
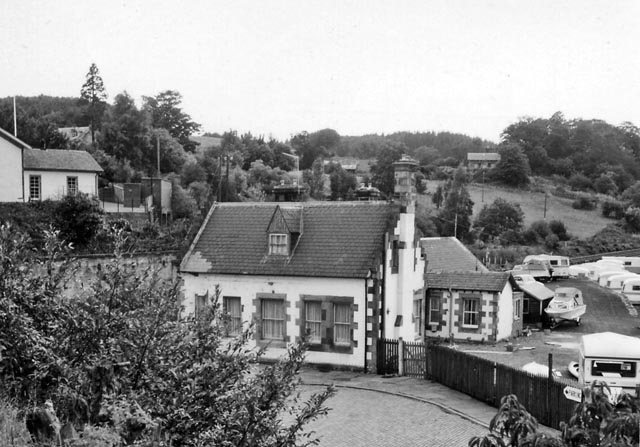
The station in 1974

The original station, built by the Scottish Central Railway, was situated to the north of the A9 road and opened on 22 May 1848. The station was closed on 1 November 1965. The small station yard on the east (southbound) side of the line, long disused, has been used for new residential accommodation, and the old station house also remains in residential use.

The new station, immediately to the south of the A9, was opened on 13 May 1985. This has allowed better facilities for car parking to be provided. Reopening by British Rail followed an increase in population and employment in the area, partly due to the relatively new University of Stirling situated to the east of Bridge of Allan.

== Services ==
It is served by three trains per hour in each direction to Stirling and Dunblane. Southbound trains continue to either Edinburgh Waverley (half-hourly) or Glasgow Queen Street (hourly, with some peak extras). A number of northbound trains continue beyond Dunblane to either Dundee or Inverness. On Sundays, there is an hourly service in each direction on the Edinburgh to Dunblane route but there are no direct trains to/from Glasgow.

Train services are operated by ScotRail, consisting mainly of Class 385, Class 170 and occasionally a Class 43. The station is equipped with a passenger information system and waiting shelters.

Electrification of the Edinburgh–Dunblane line took place in 2018, which resulted in the DMUs used on this line being replaced by electric rolling stock.

| Preceding station | National Rail | Following station |
|---|---|---|
| Stirling | ScotRail; Edinburgh–Dunblane line | Dunblane |
| Stirling | ScotRail; Croy Line | Dunblane |
| | Historical railways | |
| Stirling; Line and station open | Scottish Central Railway; Caledonian Railway | Dunblane; Line and Station open |
