= Stirling railway station (Scotland) =

Railway station in Stirling, Scotland

Stirling Scottish Gaelic: Sruighlea
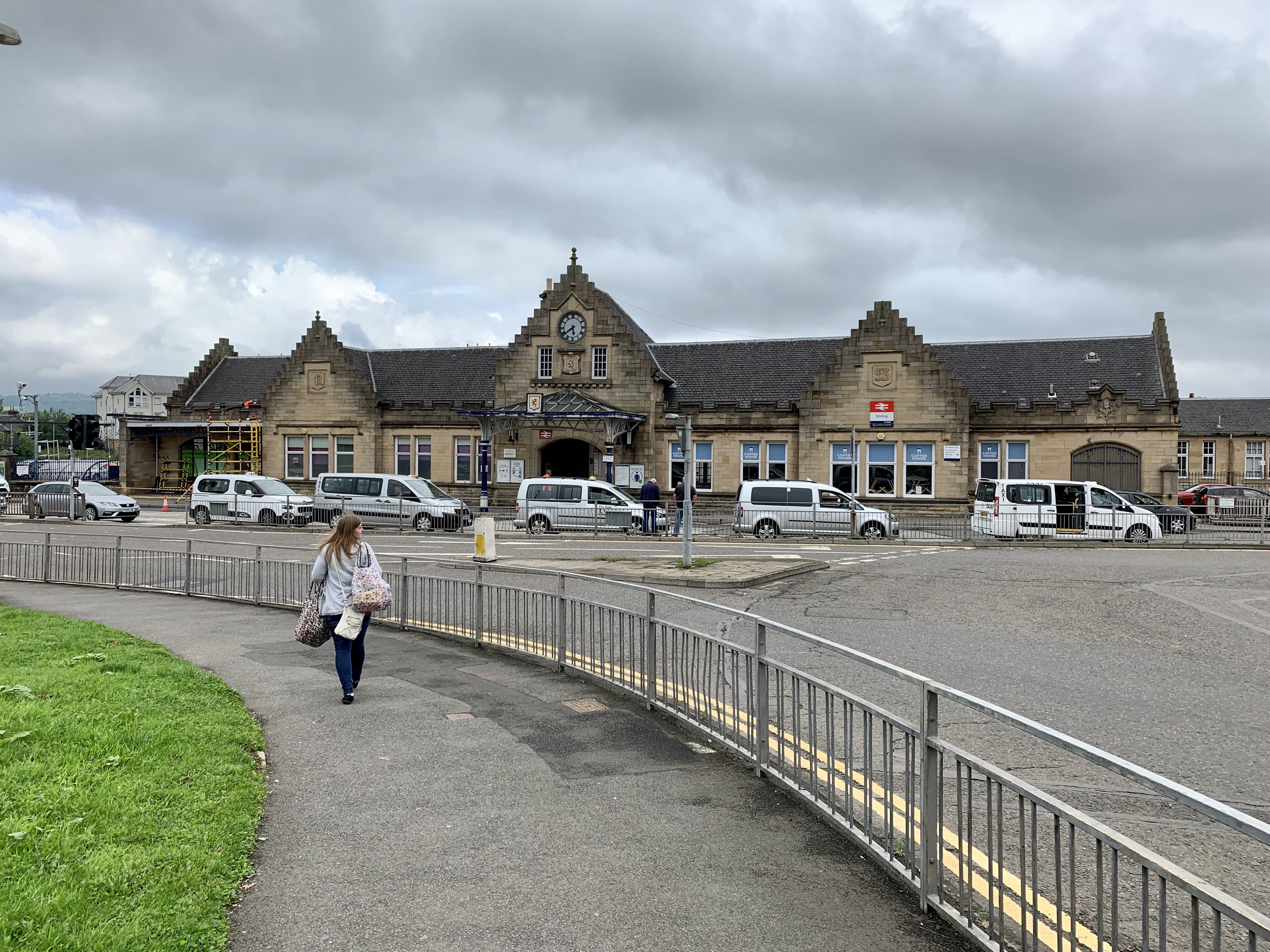
- The station's frontage

General information
- Location: Stirling, Stirling; Scotland
- Coordinates: 56.1201°N 3.9351°W
- Grid reference: NS797935
- Manager: ScotRail
- Platforms: 9 (10 Historically)

Other information
- Station code: STG

Key dates
- 1848: Opened
- 1913: Rebuilt

Passengers
- 2020/21: ▼0.432 million
- Interchange: ▼57,004
- 2021/22: ▲1.436 million
- Interchange: ▲0.289 million
- 2022/23: ▲1.927 million
- Interchange: ▼0.286 million
- 2023/24: ▲2.390 million
- Interchange: ▲0.447 million
- 2024/25: ▲2.528 million
- Interchange: ▲0.462 million

Listed Building – Category A
- Designated: 3 February 1978
- Reference no.: LB41131
Location
Notes
- Passenger statistics from the Office of Rail and Road

Stirling railway station is a railway station located in Stirling, Scotland. It is located on the former Caledonian Railway main line between Glasgow and Perth. It is the junction for the branch line to Alloa and is also served by trains on the Edinburgh to Dunblane Line and long-distance services to Dundee and Aberdeen and to Inverness via the Highland Main Line.

== History ==
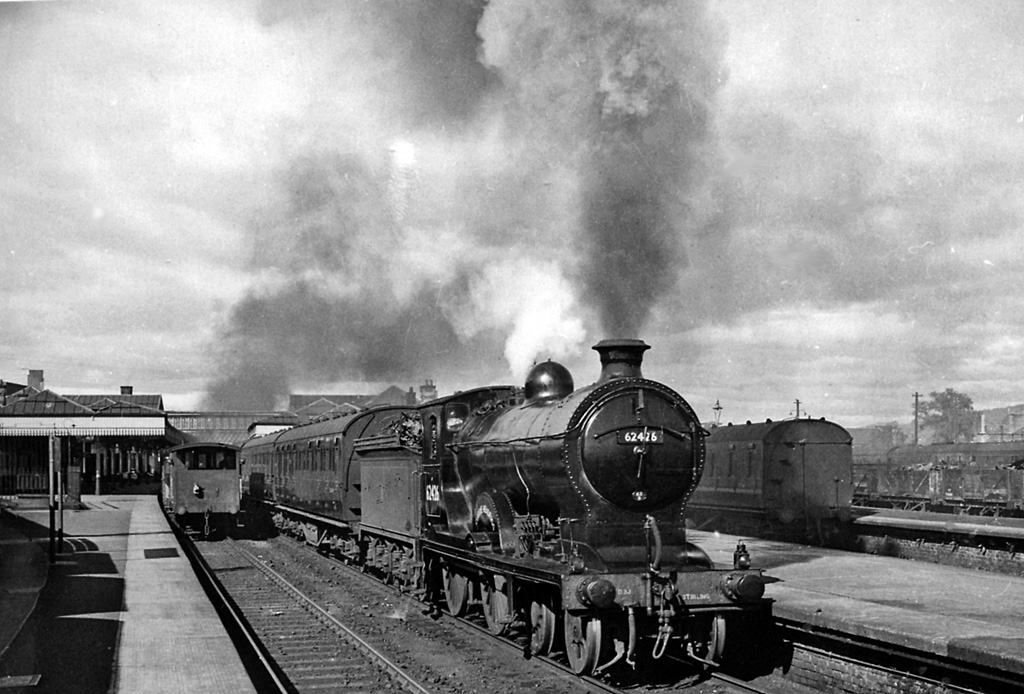
Dundee – Edinburgh express in 1957

Stirling was first connected to the Scottish Central Railway, with southbound services to Greenhill commencing on 1 March 1848 and northbound services to Perth on 22 May 1848. In 1853, the Stirling and Dunfermline Railway opened a station known as Stirling East, directly next to the main station. The Forth and Clyde Junction Railway opened a line to Balloch Central three years later, serving the main station. Through services to/from the Callander and Oban Railway also served the station from 1870.

Following a competition, the current station buildings were constructed by the Caledonian Railway in 1912-15 by James Miller and William A. Paterson, at a cost of £36,291. They have undergone several refurbishments (with minor layout changes), the most recent change being the installation of lifts to enable better access to the footbridge linking platform 2 with platforms 3 to 8.

The line to Balloch lost its passenger services in 1934 and closed as a through route in 1942, although the section from Stirling to Port of Menteith remained open for freight until 1959. The main line from Stirling to Dunfermline was not scheduled for closure under the Beeching Axe, but it was nevertheless closed in 1968. It has since been partly reopened as far as Alloa (see below). Oban services via the C&O line ended with the Beeching cuts in 1965, and the main terminus in Glasgow for services from Stirling changed from the former CR station at Buchanan Street to Queen Street the following year.

In 1968, Stirling East Station and Stirling Station were formally merged.

A Motorail service ran between London and Stirling until 1989.

In 2008, the travel centre was refurbished to improve disabled access, including power-assisted entrance doors, a wheelchair-accessible counter, and improved customer information systems. In 2009, a shelter was erected on platforms 9 and 10, and LED display boards replaced the CRT screens, including new displays for platforms 9 and 10 and the bay platforms 7 and 8. (Up to c. 1988, a large flip-dot display was located above the main concourse; this was removed and the space filled in with a large "Welcome to Stirling Station" sign.) From December 2009, automated announcements were provided, replacing the manual announcements made from the supervisor's office on platform 3. In 2013, a new public address system was installed. In 2018, work began to refurbish the footbridge. It was raised to allow the tracks underneath to be electrified, and lifts installed to allow step-free access to platform 9. The refurbished bridge was opened on 9 September 2019.

In July 2022, work began on a £5 million redevelopment of the station's public realm, carried out by Luddon Construction. Funded by the Scottish Government through Sustrans, Stirling Council, Network Rail Scotland and Serco Group, the works included the creation of a pedestrianised plaza, removal of the roundabout on Goosecroft Road, new covered cycle parking for 150 bicycles, refurbished customer waiting facilities, and improved accessibility. The redevelopment was officially opened on 27 June 2023 by Fiona Hyslop, Minister for Transport.

== Description ==
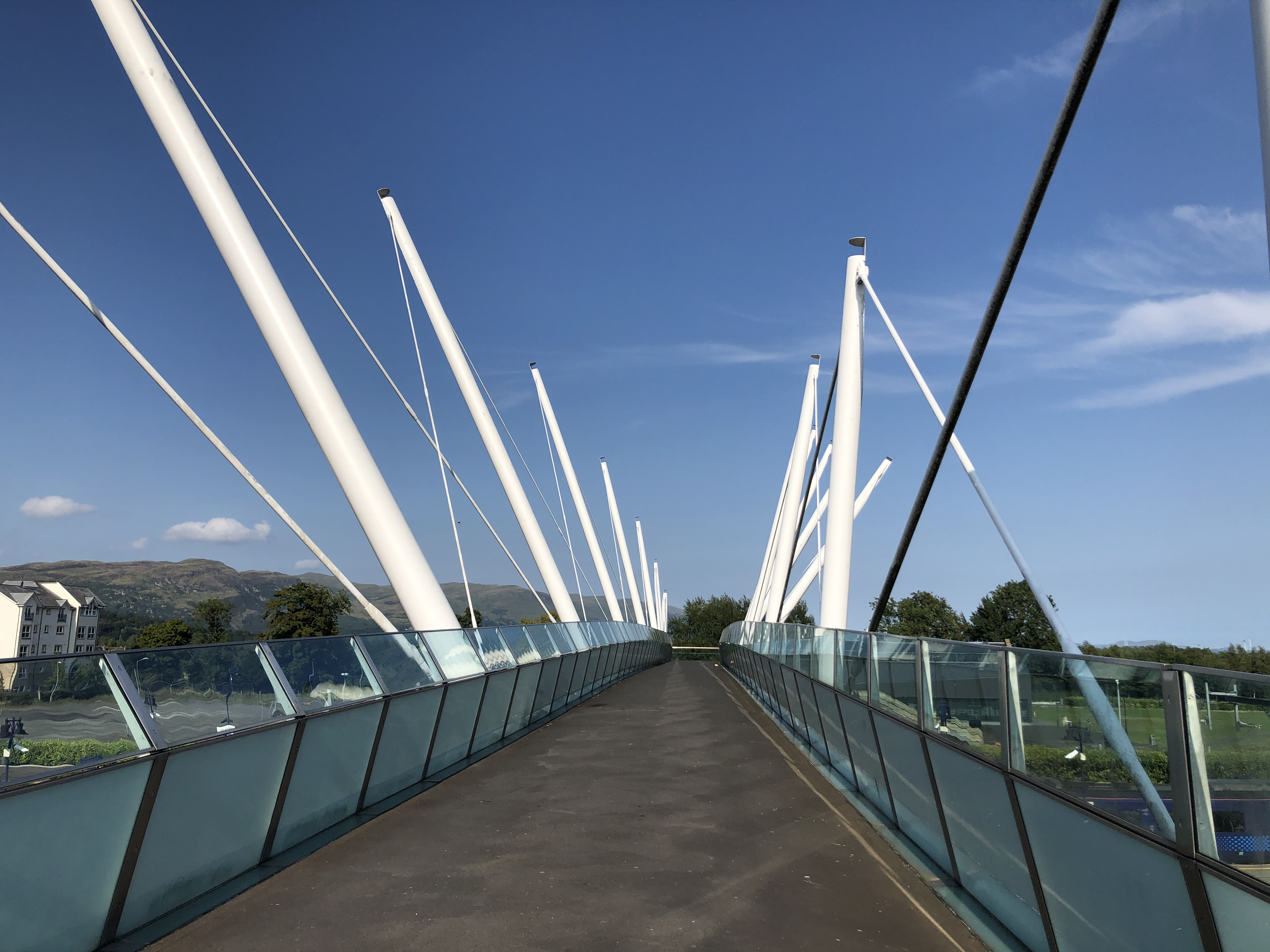
Forthside Bridge (completed in 2009) passes over the station.

The station building was constructed in 1915 by James Miller, replacing the original 1848 structure designed by Andrew Heiton, and is listed by Historic Environment Scotland as a Category A listed building. Miller's design continues the circular spaces and flowing curves of his celebrated Wemyss Bay station.

The station houses a Neighbourhood Policing Team (NPT) from the British Transport Police. Currently two officers work from Stirling and cover Stirling, Alloa, Bridge of Allan, Camelon, Dunblane, Falkirk High, Falkirk Grahamston and Larbert.

The Stirling Area Command of the Forth Valley Division of Police Scotland cover the territorial area that the Stirling NPT covers and will assist when the BTP officers are not available.

== Services ==
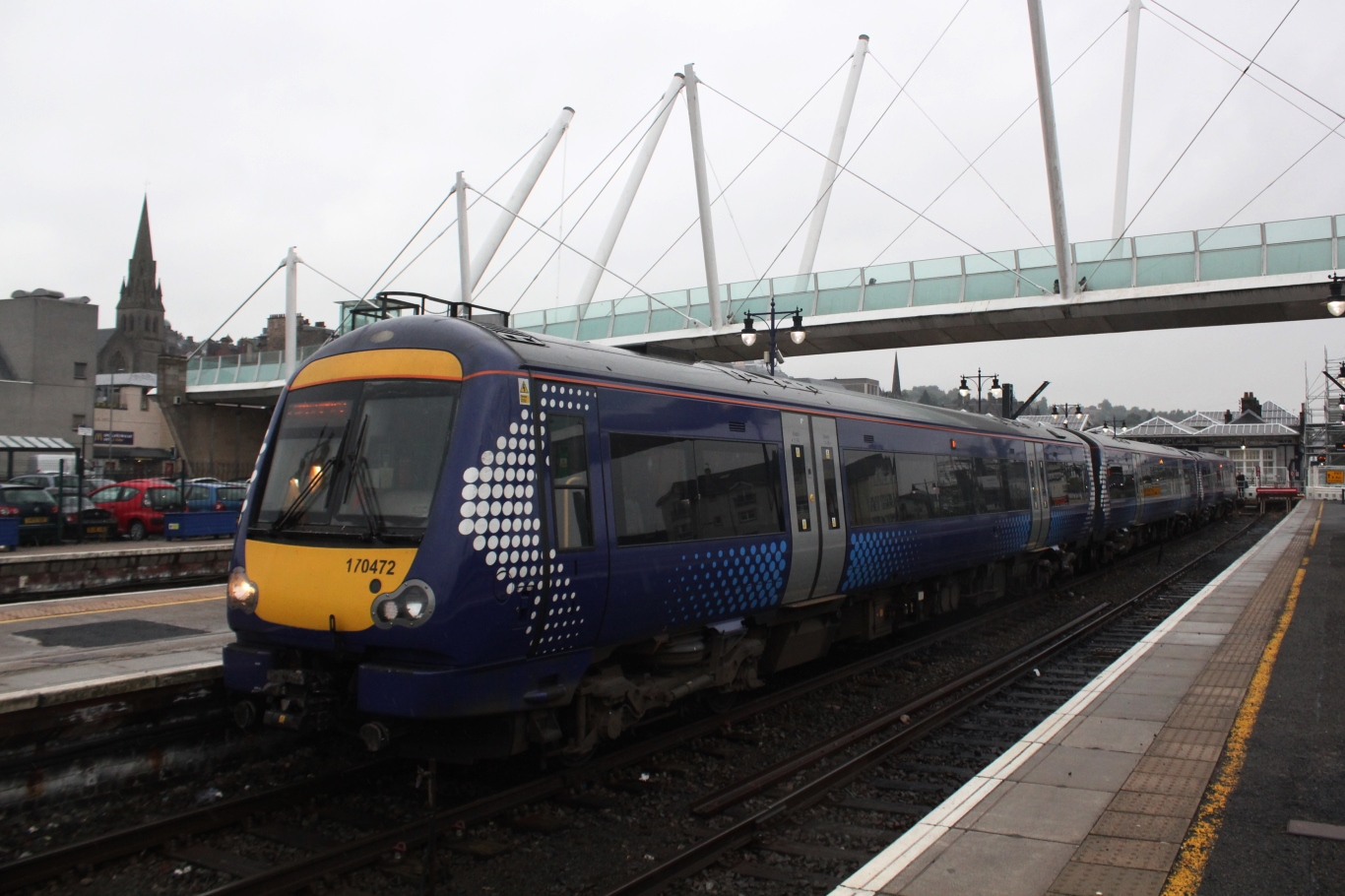
An Abellio ScotRail Class 170 at Stirling

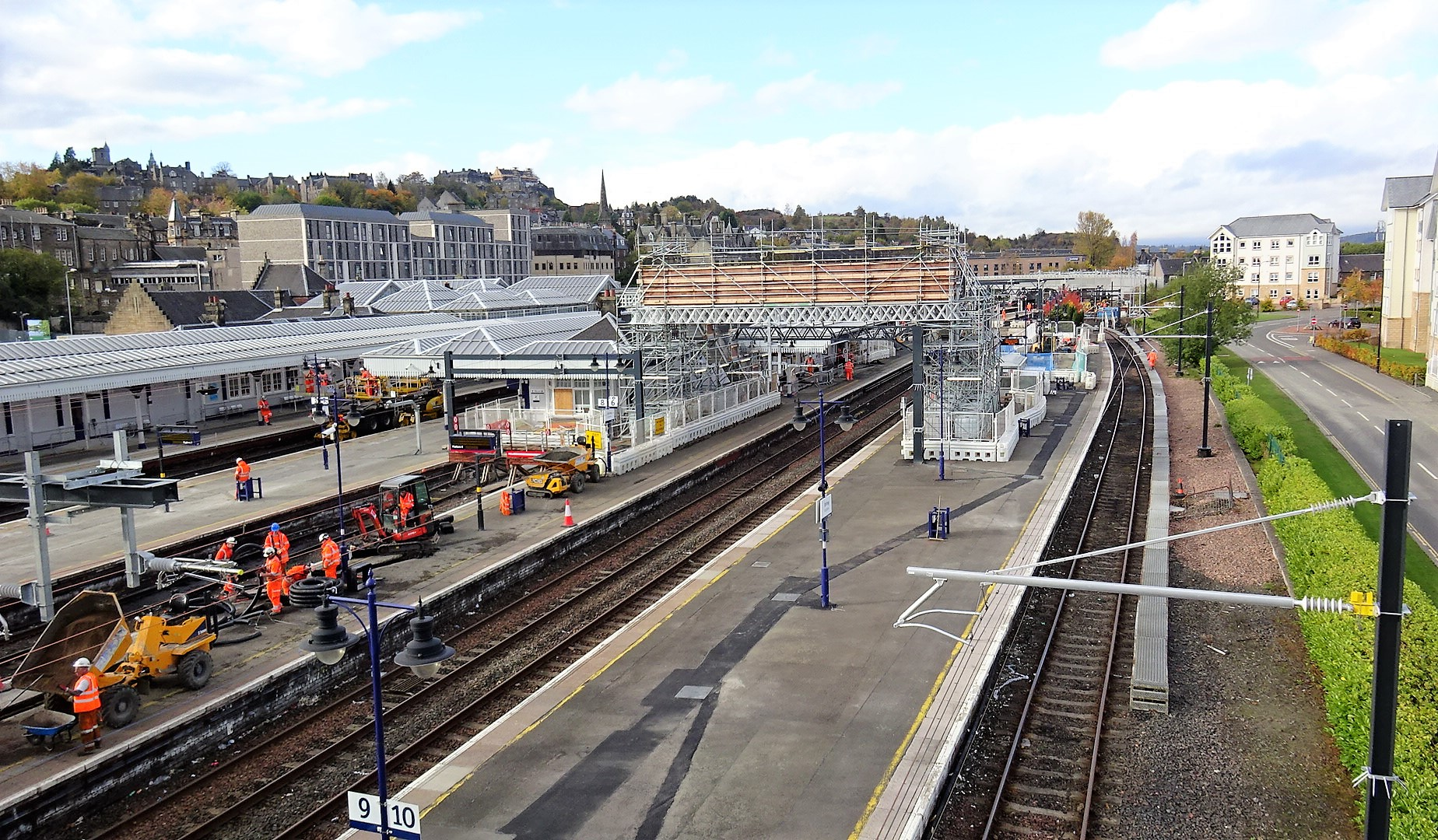
The station during electrification works

Trains operate north to Dunblane (three trains per hour), to Perth, Dundee and Aberdeen (hourly), Inverness (four trains per day), south west to Glasgow Queen Street (three trains per hour), and east to Edinburgh Waverley (half-hourly). The service to Alloa and Dunfermline was withdrawn in October 1968, but the reopening of the Stirling-Alloa-Kincardine rail link partially restored that service with an hourly service from Glasgow to Alloa as an extension of the Croy Line services. This utilises the existing DMU from Glasgow, which previously spent considerable time in one of the bay platforms at Stirling with engines idling, but now utilises the layover time to make the return trip to & from Alloa.

Most services are operated by ScotRail; with one train per day southbound to London Kings Cross and one train per day northbound to Inverness operated by London North Eastern Railway; and one train per day Sunday – Friday southbound to London Euston and northbound to Inverness operated by Caledonian Sleeper. Additionally, there is a service to London Euston operated by Lumo. The station has nine platforms, though they are ordered 2 to 10. The site of Platform 1 is now occupied by a car park; the platforms were not renumbered. The bay platforms at the north end of the station (Platforms 4 and 5) survive but are not available to passenger trains. The bay platforms at the south end of the station (Platforms 7 and 8) are not normally used for weekday services, but the first services of the day use trains that have been stabled there overnight and they have been fitted with passenger information displays.

The lines from Glasgow to Alloa and from Polmont to Dunblane were resignalled and electrified by 2018 as part of the rolling modernisation work associated with the Edinburgh to Glasgow Improvement Programme.

=== Summary ===
Services in trains per hour (tph) / day (tpd) are as follows:

- 4 tph to Glasgow Queen Street (plus 5 tpd from Inverness)
- 2 tph to Edinburgh Waverley (plus 5 tpd from Inverness)
- 2 tph to Alloa
- 2 tph to Dunblane
- 1 tph to Aberdeen
- 1 tph to Dundee
- 1 tph to Inverness
- 1 tpd to London Kings Cross
- 4 tpd to London Euston

Preceding station	National Rail	Following station
Dunblane	Caledonian Sleeper; Highland Caledonian Sleeper	Falkirk Grahamston (Southbound only)
Edinburgh Waverley (Northbound only)	Caledonian Sleeper; Highland Caledonian Sleeper	Dunblane
Falkirk Grahamston	London North Eastern Railway; East Coast Main Line	Dunblane
Glasgow Queen Street	ScotRail; Glasgow to Aberdeen Line; Highland Main Line	Gleneagles
Larbert	ScotRail; Edinburgh–Dunblane line	Bridge of Allan
Larbert	ScotRail; Croy Line	Bridge of Allan
Larbert	ScotRail; Croy Line	Alloa
Larbert	Lumo; London Euston to Stirling	Terminus
	Historical railways	
Bannockburn; Line open; Station closed	Caledonian Railway; Scottish Central Railway	Bridge of Allan; Line and Station open
Terminus	North British Railway; Stirling and Dunfermline Railway	Causewayhead (Stirling); Line open; station closed
Terminus	North British Railway; Forth and Clyde Junction Railway	Gargunnock; Line and station closed

== See also ==
- Dunblane railway station
- Alloa railway station
- Stirling and Dunfermline Railway
- Scottish Central Railway
- Caledonian Railway
- Edinburgh–Dunblane line
- Stirling-Alloa-Kincardine rail link
