= Bonnybridge High railway station =

Disused railway station in Falkirk, Scotland

Bonnybridge High
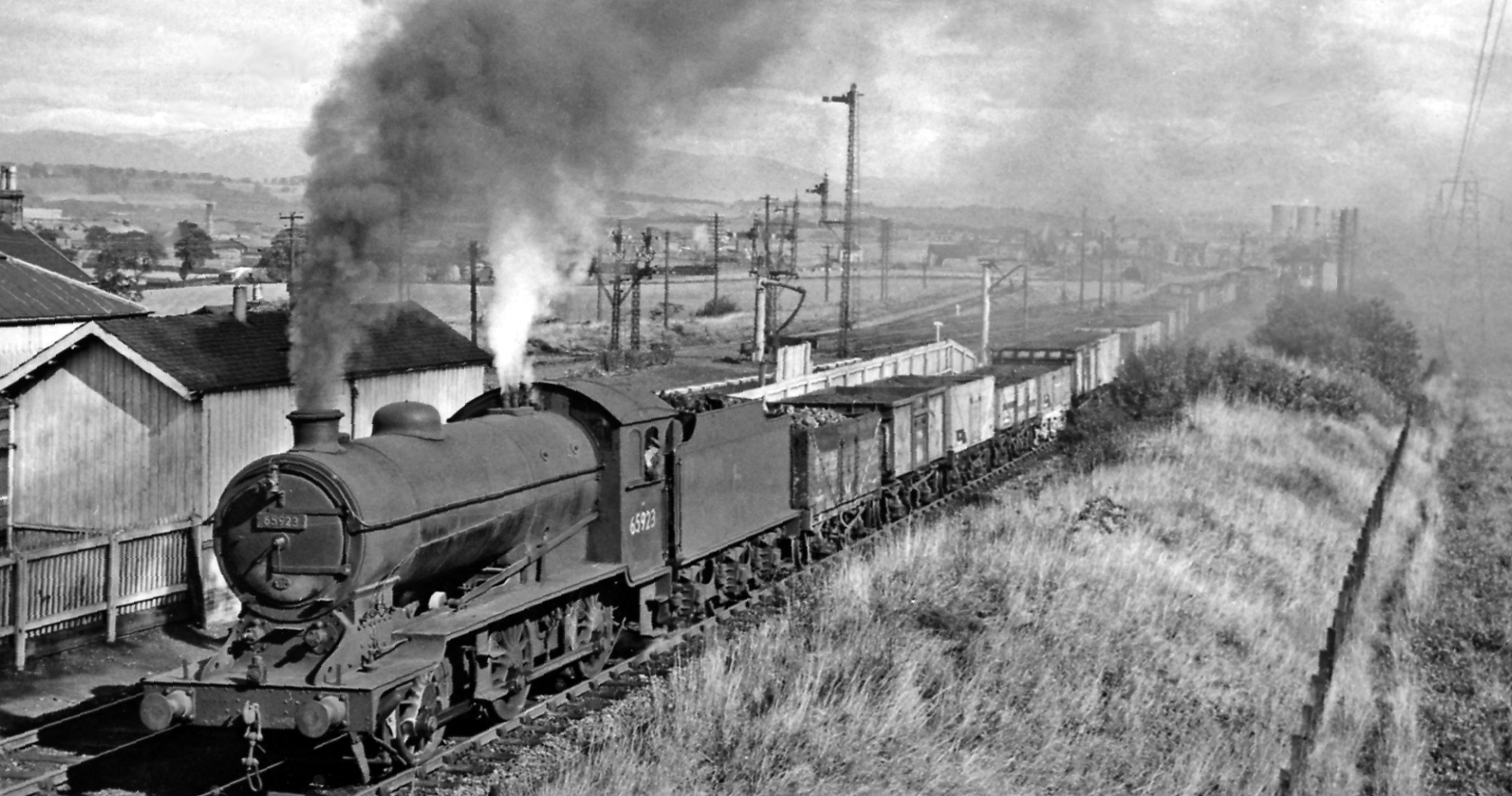
- The station in 1957

General information
- Location: Bonnybridge, Falkirk; Scotland
- Coordinates: 55.9921°N 3.8764°W
- Grid reference: NS830792
- Platforms: 2

Other information
- Status: Disused

History
- Original company: Edinburgh and Glasgow Railway
- Pre-grouping: North British Railway
- Post-grouping: London and North Eastern Railway

Key dates
- 21 April 1842: Opened as Bonnybridge
- 1953: Renamed Bonnybridge High
- 14 June 1965: Name reverted to Bonnybridge
- 6 March 1967: Closed
Location

Bonnybridge High railway station was a railway station serving the village of Bonnybridge. The station was originally part of the Edinburgh and Glasgow Railway.

== History ==
The station opened on 21 April 1842 as Bonnybridge, although there was a station of the same name on the nearby Caledonian Railway Main Line. This E&GR station was not renamed to Bonnybridge High until 1953, after the closure of the CR station in the 1930s. The station name reverted to its original in 1965 for the last two years of its existence.

Preceding station	Historical railways	Following station
Falkirk High; Line and station open	North British Railway; Edinburgh and Glasgow Railway	Upper Greenhill; Line open, station closed
