= Haymarket railway station =

Railway station in Edinburgh, Scotland

Haymarket Scottish Gaelic: Margadh an Fheòir
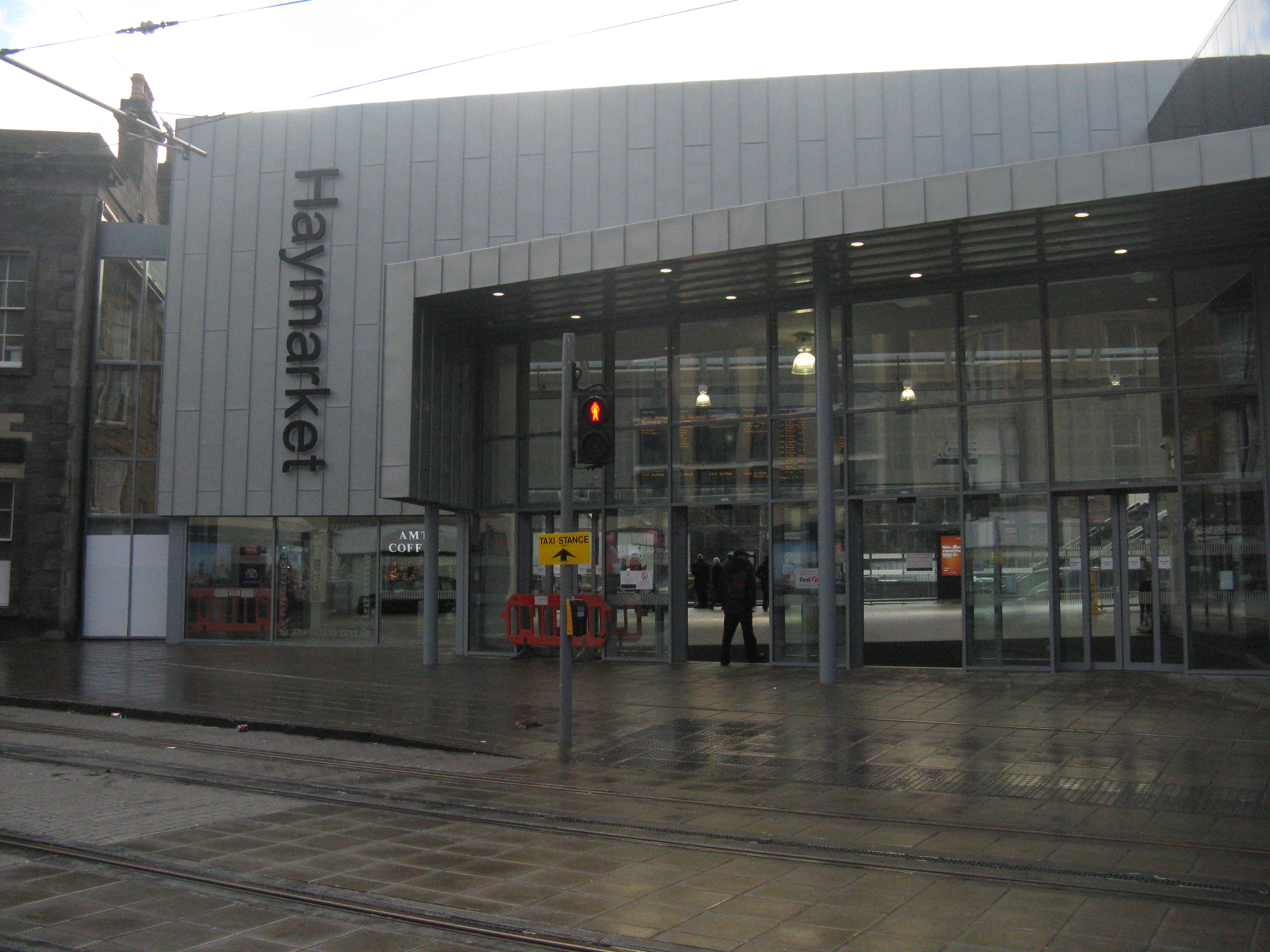
- New entrance to Haymarket railway station in January 2014.

General information
- Location: Haymarket, Edinburgh, City of Edinburgh; Scotland
- Coordinates: 55.9453°N 3.2187°W
- Grid reference: NT239731
- Owner: Network Rail
- Manager: ScotRail
- Platforms: 5 for National Rail, 2 for Edinburgh Trams

Other information
- Station code: HYM

History
- Opened: 21 February 1842
- Original company: Edinburgh and Glasgow Railway
- Pre-grouping: North British Railway
- Post-grouping: London and North Eastern Railway

Passengers
- 2020/21: ▼0.448 million
- Interchange: ▼80,846
- 2021/22: ▲1.501 million
- Interchange: ▲0.365 million
- 2022/23: ▲2.308 million
- Interchange: ▲0.427 million
- 2023/24: ▲2.981 million
- Interchange: ▲0.617 million
- 2024/25: ▲3.334 million
- Interchange: ▲0.730 million

Listed Building – Category A
- Designated: 27 October 1964
- Reference no.: LB26901
Location
Notes
- Passenger statistics from the Office of Rail and Road. Station usage figures saw a large decrease in 2020/21 due to the COVID-19 pandemic

Haymarket railway station is the second largest railway station in Edinburgh, Scotland, after Waverley railway station.

The station serves as a major commuter and long-distance destination, located near the city centre, in the West End. Trains from the station serve much of Scotland, including Fife and Glasgow, as well as suburban lines to the east, and the East Coast Main Line through to London King's Cross. It is the fifth busiest railway station in Scotland.

== History ==
During 1842, Haymarket railway station was opened as the original terminus of the Edinburgh and Glasgow Railway. The station represented the launch of a new age of travelling opportunities to the Scottish capital, being the first intercity route to be built and offering a previously unheard of journey time of two and a half hours between Scotland's two largest cities. Reportedly, early passenger numbers were far in excess of any expectations held during the line's construction, having topped one million by 1846. Due to backlash from the Church of Scotland, the early practice of running Sunday trains was suspended.

The station building itself featured impressive Doric-style porticos and was often hailed for its impressive architecture and engineering. It served not only a major transport hub for the city, but also as the headquarters of the Edinburgh and Glasgow Railway company itself. During 1846, the line was extended through the Haymarket tunnels and Princes Street Gardens to what is today known as Edinburgh Waverley railway station; other railway stations, which had the benefit of being more centrally sited, were also springing up around the city and some came to overshadow Haymarket Station. Its name has always been just Haymarket, as opposed to Edinburgh Haymarket — although the latter designation has been used in timetables by some train operating companies for the purpose of clarity.

The connecting line to Slateford, which is presently used by services heading towards Glasgow Central railway station and the West Coast Main Line, was originally constructed during 1853 by the Caledonian Railway; however, it lay disused for more than a century due to what became a long-running disagreement over running rights with the E&GR and its successor companies - the line was finally commissioned during September 1964 by the nationalised operator British Rail; this measure allowed for the closure of the former CR terminus located at Princes Street during the following year. Haymarket TMD, a service and maintenance depot, is located 0.6 miles (1 km) west of the station, on the north side of the railway, adjacent to Murrayfield Stadium.

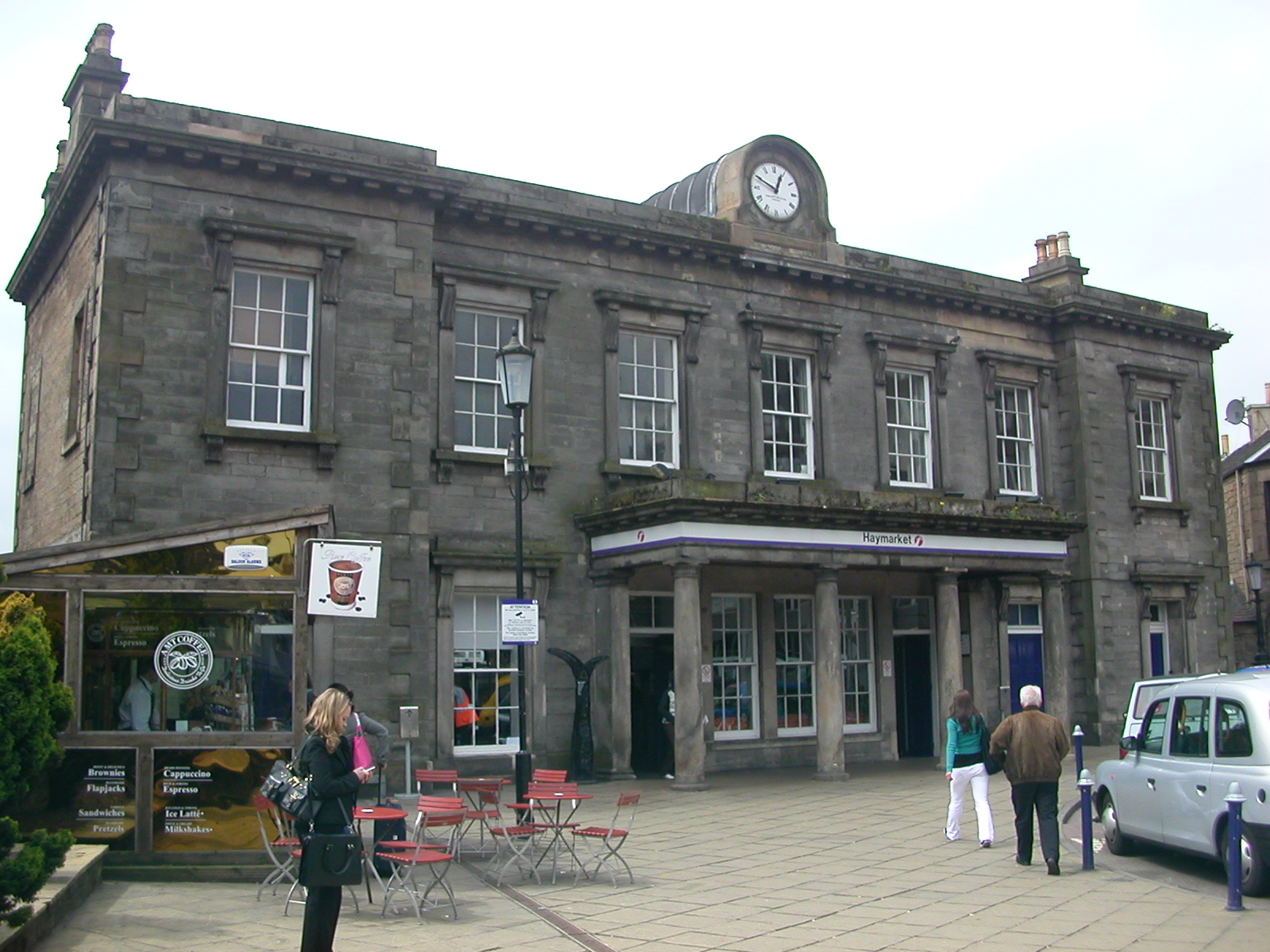
The old station front in June 2007, which is still in use as a side entrance

By the 1890s, Haymarket had lost some of its original appeal, and came to be often subject to criticism over a lack of maintenance and a perpetual climate of austerity. During 1894, covered platforms were added to the station by the railway engineer James Carswell. Reportedly, during the 1960s and 1970s, British Rail studied options for several new station buildings and other renovations, but ultimately did not want to invest in Haymarket in case it was soon closed.

During 1983, British Rail performed some alterations to the station; Haymarket's original train shed was demolished and moved to Bo'ness, while its footbridge was replaced by a smaller counterpart and new platform canopies were installed. As a result of these renovations, the station broke new ground as the first purpose-built barrierless station. In 1989, the south tunnel was electrified by British Rail, while Platform 4 was also extended, as part of the East Coast Main Line electrification programme to allow for through electric trains from King's Cross in London to Glasgow Central and from Waverley station towards the West Coast Main Line. During 2011, in conjunction with the Airdrie to Bathgate project, the north tunnel was also electrified.

Since December 2006, the station features four through platforms along with a single bay platform sited on the north side of the station. As a general operating rule, trains to and from stations across the Forth Bridge tend to use Platforms 1 and 2, while those trains running to and from Glasgow and the West Coast Main Line make use of Platforms 3 and 4. The bay platform, which is presently designated as Platform 0, was built for services that terminated at Haymarket, which has often occurred when major engineering works take place at the larger Waverley station. All of the station's platforms are now electrified.

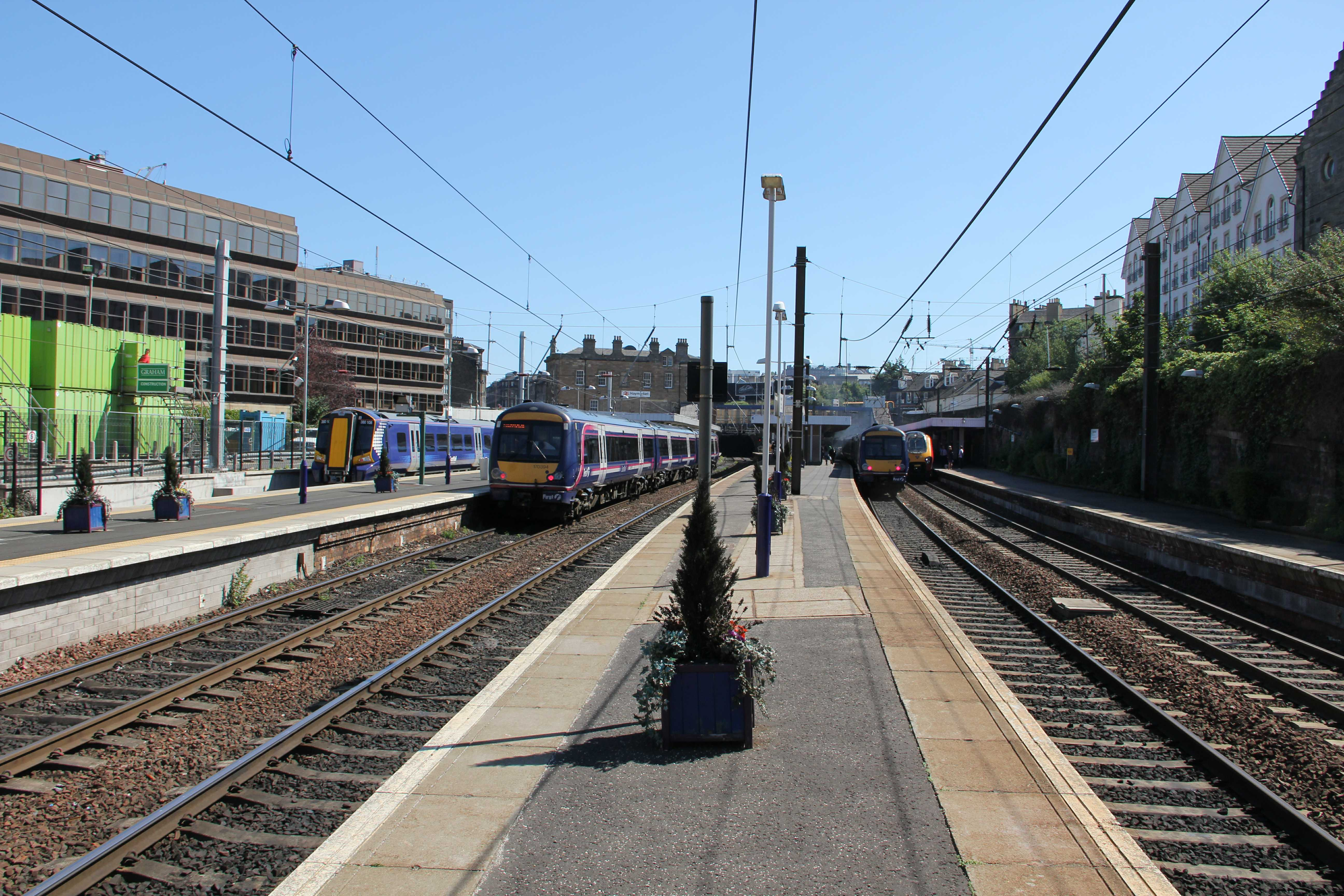
Platforms 0 to 4 at Haymarket in July 2011, showing all platforms electrified; note the tunnels leading eastwards to Waverley station in the background

Between 1997 and 2012, the annual number of passengers that were recorded as having used the facility had risen by a massive 138 per cent; by 2012, in excess of two million passengers using the station during each year. According to some projections, passenger numbers at Haymarket are expected to climb to as high as 10 million by 2030.

The station has been listed as being amongst the most congested on the Scottish railway network, which has been attributed to repeated rapid increases in commuters using it and aggravated by a lack of modernisation for some time. According to industry publication Rail Engineer, by 2012, Haymarket possessed one of the oldest station buildings and ticket offices in the whole of the United Kingdom; the old facility was small and the 1980s-era footbridge was relatively narrow, factors which did not lend themselves to a huge expansion in passenger footfall. In part to address this growth, during the 2000s and 2010s, state-owned rail owner and maintainer Network Rail performed a £24 million upgrade programme at Haymarket Station, as had been announced during its 2007 business plan; this work was focused on the remodelling of its passenger facilities to better serve growing demand.

The installation of passenger lifts to enable all platforms to be fully accessible to those with reduced mobility, in accordance with the Disability Discrimination Act, was one major change enacted during 2011. However, perhaps the most extensive modification programme to be made at Haymarket Station to date, which involved the development of a new concourse and various other improvements to improve the station's capacity, were performed as a part of the wider Edinburgh to Glasgow Improvement Programme (EGIP), which sought to improve all rail-related matters between the two largest cities in Scotland.

=== Redevelopment ===
Under EGIP, £25 million was allocated for the redevelopment of Haymarket Station. The station's new design was developed by a multi- discipline team, headed by the Halcrow Group, the work's lead consultant; IDP Architects designed much of the programme's architectural aspects, while SVM Glasgow provided mechanical and electrical engineering support. Factors which had to be taken into account included the booking office's category A listed building, its prominent location in the city, and newly developed tram network Edinburgh Trams that was to be incorporated in the station's role as a transport hub. During December 2011, construction company Morgan Sindall were awarded the £25 million 'target cost' contract to construct the new station.

The design produced centered around the construction of brand new station building, the interior of which accommodates ten times the amount of public space for passengers as its predecessor. The redeveloped station also features a new main entrance, in addition to the retention of its earlier entryway, which also provides for direct pedestrian access to the new tram route passing through Haymarket Terrace. The new building is connected to all of the station's platforms via a newly built, wider footbridge, which was provisioned with both lifts and escalators, along with special event stairs to facilitate excellent access to the nearby Murrayfield Stadium. In addition, various retail outlets were established in the new building; approximately 15 per cent of the new concourse is allocated to retail space.

More minor changes that were incorporated into the design include the installation of energy-saving lighting and modern passenger information systems, while the platforms were resurfaced and the installation of longer canopies, which is aimed at providing better protection from bad weather conditions and increase boarding speeds. One particularly unusual feature adopted was the ETFE Air Filled Pillow roof, which uses pillows of transparent ethylene tetrafluoroethylene (ETFE) material filled with dehumidified air which is cycled via a central air pump; it offers a reduced weight while also being an intentionally sacrificial element of the structure in the event of an accident or major incident. Some design changes had to be incorporated before planning permission would be granted; in one case, the proposed copper cladding had to be replaced by a black granite and zinc counterpart.

During May 2012, construction work commenced at the station, initially focused upon temporary station alterations to create space for the new concourse and the undercroft below it. Where possible, items were partially built off-site before being transported and moved into position using large cranes, such as the steelwork for the new footbridge, which minimised passenger impact and was considered to be more safe. According to Network Rail's project manager Tom McPake, work typically involved no disruption to train services as it only required rules of the route possessions; keeping the station operational throughout was described as being the main challenge. Reportedly, the redevelopment scheme had been completed both on time and within the assigned budget. During December 2013, the Minister for Transport and the Islands Keith Brown formally reopened the station, marking the official completion of work. Cleanup work, such as the demolition of the old footbridge and lifts, continued until April 2014.

== 1924 accident ==
On 28 July 1924, a passenger train ignored a stop signal and collided with a second train at the station. Five people were killed. According to the report written by Colonel J. W. Pringle for the Ministry of Transport, the accident was a SPAD (Signal Passed at Danger) caused by the position of the driver, his misreading of the signal, and his not being able to hear the warning bell owing to the noise of the engine.

== Transport interchange ==
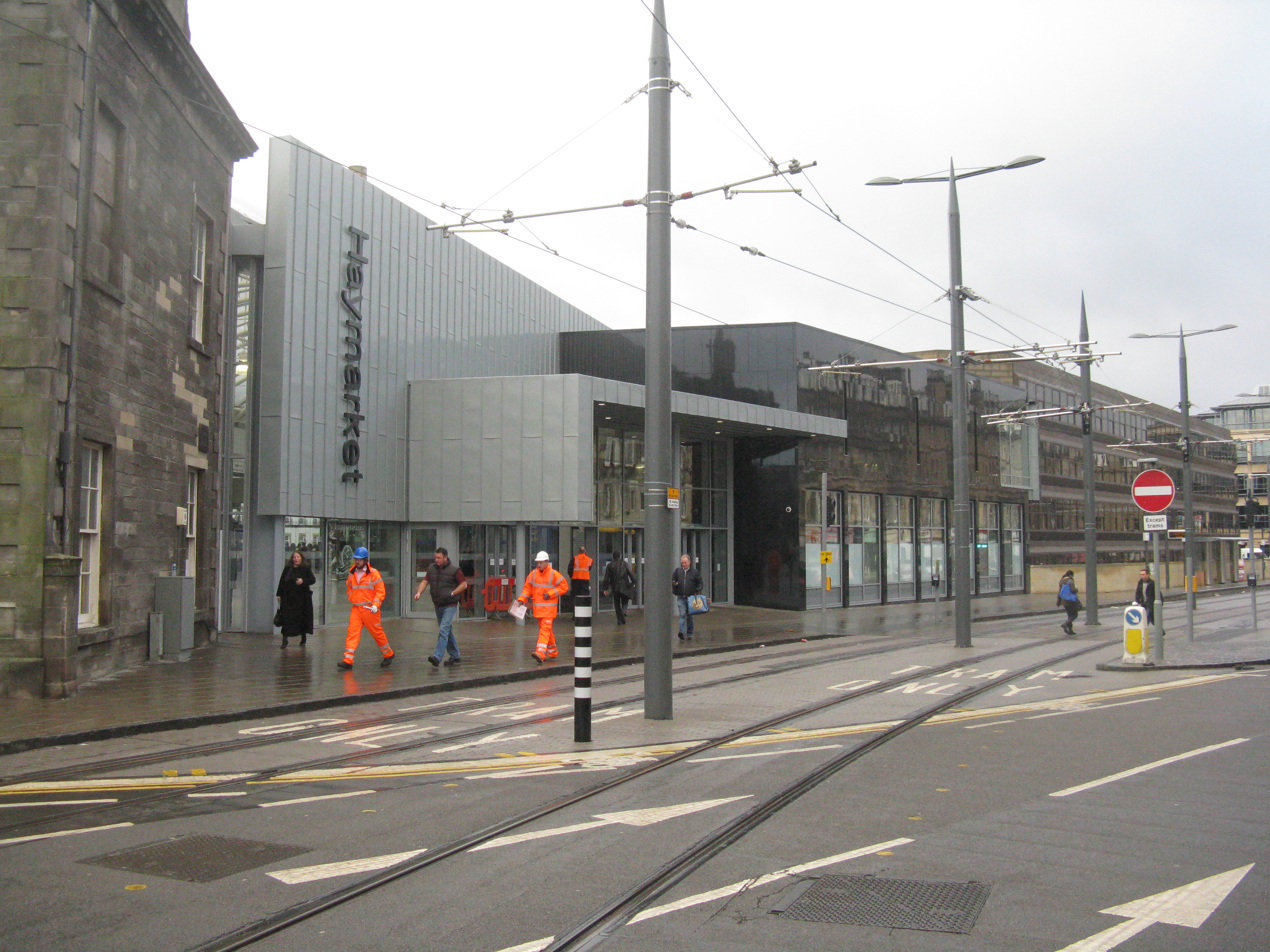
Tram tracks outside the station in January 2014.

The railway station is served by Edinburgh Trams service, which began operating in May 2014. Renovations to the station, in compliance with the Edinburgh to Glasgow Improvement Programme, have turned it into an intermodal transport interchange, whereby it is simple to connect between the trams, bus services (including Lothian Buses, McGill's Scotland East, Bright Bus Airport Express and Scottish Citylink) and taxi services. The 900 Edinburgh–Glasgow bus service calls here.

== Services ==
Preceding station	Edinburgh Trams	Following station
West End towards Newhaven	Newhaven – Edinburgh Airport	Murrayfield Stadium towards Edinburgh Airport
	National Rail	
Edinburgh Waverley	CrossCountry CrossCountry Route	Motherwell
Edinburgh Waverley	CrossCountry CrossCountry Route	Inverkeithing
Edinburgh Waverley	London North Eastern Railway Northern Lights	Inverkeithing
Edinburgh Waverley	London North Eastern Railway Highland Chieftain	Falkirk Grahamston
Edinburgh Waverley	Avanti West Coast London – North West & Scotland	Carlisle
Edinburgh Waverley	Avanti West Coast London – North West & Scotland	Lockerbie
Edinburgh Waverley	TransPennine Express Anglo-Scottish Route	Carlisle
Edinburgh Waverley	TransPennine Express Anglo-Scottish Route	Lockerbie
Edinburgh Waverley	ScotRail Glasgow-Edinburgh via Falkirk High line	Linlithgow
Edinburgh Waverley	ScotRail; Edinburgh–Dunblane line	Edinburgh Park
Edinburgh Waverley	ScotRail; North Clyde Line	Edinburgh Park
Edinburgh Waverley	ScotRail; Fife Circle Line	South Gyle
Edinburgh Waverley	ScotRail; Fife Circle Line	Edinburgh Gateway
Edinburgh Waverley	ScotRail; Shotts Line	Slateford
Edinburgh Waverley	ScotRail; North Berwick Line; Limited service	Terminus
Edinburgh Waverley	Lumo; Glasgow – London	Falkirk High
	Historical railways	
Edinburgh Waverley; Line and station open	North British Railway; Edinburgh and Glasgow Railway	Saughton; Line open, station closed
Edinburgh Waverley; Line and station open	North British Railway; Corstorphine Branch	Balgreen Halt; Line partly open, station closed
Gorgie; Line open, station closed	North British Railway; Edinburgh Suburban Line	Edinburgh Waverley; Line and station open

== Platforms and layout ==
Haymarket has a total of 5 platforms, numbered 0 to 4. Platforms 1 and 2 are used for trains to/from stations across the River Forth (accessed via the Forth Rail bridge). Platforms 3 and 4 are used for trains to Glasgow as well as all West Coast Main Line Services. Platform 0 is a little-used bay platform on the north side of the station for the small number of services which are timetabled to start from (and terminate at) the station instead of Waverley.

== Awards ==
In 2026 Haymarket was nominated for the Large Station of the Year award in the National Rail Awards.
