= Edinburgh to Glasgow Improvement Programme =

Plan to increase rail capacity between Edinburgh and Glasgow

The Edinburgh Glasgow Improvement Programme or EGIP was an initiative funded by Transport Scotland on behalf of the Scottish Government to increase capacity on the main railway line between Edinburgh and Glasgow, with new, longer electric trains running by 2017 and scheduled for full completion in 2019. It was expected to cost £742 million and delivered by Network Rail.

The programme was initially announced by the Labour-Liberal Democrat coalition government in 2006, and was continued, although cut back from the original scheme, by the subsequent Scottish National Party governments. It was officially completed on 4 October 2021 with the completion of the redevelopment of the Glasgow Queen Street station.

== Aims ==
The project aimed to deliver the infrastructure to enable 8 car, electric trains to operate (an increase from the previous 6 car maximum) on Edinburgh - Glasgow services with a fastest journey time of 42 minutes.

The additional train carriages were to allow a total increase in capacity of 30%.

The project was also designed to deliver electrification of 94 miles (151 km) of track including diversionary routes through Cumbernauld and Falkirk.

== Timeline of planned improvements ==
- December 2013 - Haymarket Station redevelopment opened.
- May 2014 - Glasgow - Cumbernauld electrification completed.
- May 2015 - Haymarket - Inverkeithing signalling renewals completed.
- July 2015 - Winchburgh Tunnel clearance completed.
- April 2016 - 61 Bridges and structures cleared for electrification.
- August 2016 - Glasgow Queen Street (High Level) tunnel track and trackbed replacement completion.
- October 2016 - Platform extensions at Linlithgow, Croy, Polmont and Falkirk High.
- December 2016 - Platform extensions at Edinburgh Waverley.
- December 2016 - Electrification of the Edinburgh to Glasgow via Falkirk High Line.
- December 2016 - Edinburgh Gateway station opened.
- 2017 - Millerhill Depot in Millerhill Marshalling Yard opened.
- December 2017 - Delivery of first new Hitachi Class 385 trains.
- July 2018 - First Hitachi Class 385 EMUs enter service.
- December 2018 - Platform extensions at Glasgow Queen Street.
- December 2018 - Electrification of the Cumbernauld - Falkirk line.
- 4 October 2021 - The redevelopment of Glasgow Queen Street station was officially completed.

== Previous proposals ==
As originally announced in 2006, the project would have cost £1 billion and aimed to increase capacity by increasing service frequency to six trains per hour (tph) rather than by lengthening trains.

Transport Scotland commissioned Jacobs to examine the project for potential savings and they identified that the a similar capacity increase could be achieved by increasing train length while maintaining a 4tph frequency. This had previously been thought to be impossible due to restrictions at Glasgow Queen Street station. The redevelopment of Buchanan Galleries allowed this option to be developed instead with a major rebuild and the lengthening of platforms at Queen St high level station.

This enabled several major schemes to be dropped from the scope of EGIP as they were only required if an increase in train frequency took place:

- Construction of turnback sidings at Abbeyhill Junction and Croy.
- Remodelling of Greenhill Junction to provide a non-conflicting junction;
- Construction of a new Almond Chord line at Dalmeny to allow trains from the west to access the Haymarket north lines without obstructing existing services at the junction on approach to the station.

Another proposed scheme the Garngad Chord, near Springburn had already been dropped from the scheme. It was intended to allow Glasgow-Cumbernauld services to use the North Clyde Line into Queen Street Low Level, thus freeing up capacity on the High Level station. Instead services started on this route in 2014 with a reversal in Springburn, creating a slightly longer journey time.

Electrification to Stirling, Alloa and Dunblane was originally reported to have been dropped as part of the changes to EGIP. Electrification is continuing and is expected to be complete by 2018; it has been carried out under the rolling programme of electrification, rather than as part of the EGIP programme.

== Criticism ==
The new proposals were criticised by business and environmental groups. Sustainable transport campaign group Transform Scotland described the cuts as 'a major step backwards' and suggested that the government's concurrent decision to bring forward a £3 billion project to dual the A9 road demonstrated a 'perverse set of priorities'.

The fastest journey times between Glasgow and Edinburgh under the scheme will now be 42 minutes compared to the just over half an hour previously promised.

One of the most disruptive elements of the project was the complete closure of Glasgow Queen Street High Level for a 20-week period between March and August 2016. This was to allow replacement of the track in the Cowlairs Tunnel and the lowering of the track bed to accommodate the installation of overhead electrification equipment in the tunnel. ScotRail warned that the diversion works created a potential single point of failure which could paralyse Glasgow's rail network in the event of a train failure or other incident.

== See also ==
- Airdrie–Bathgate rail link
- Glasgow Airport Rail Link
- History of rail transport in Great Britain 1995 to date
