= Croy railway station =

Railway station in North Lanarkshire, Scotland

Croy Scottish Gaelic: Crothaidh
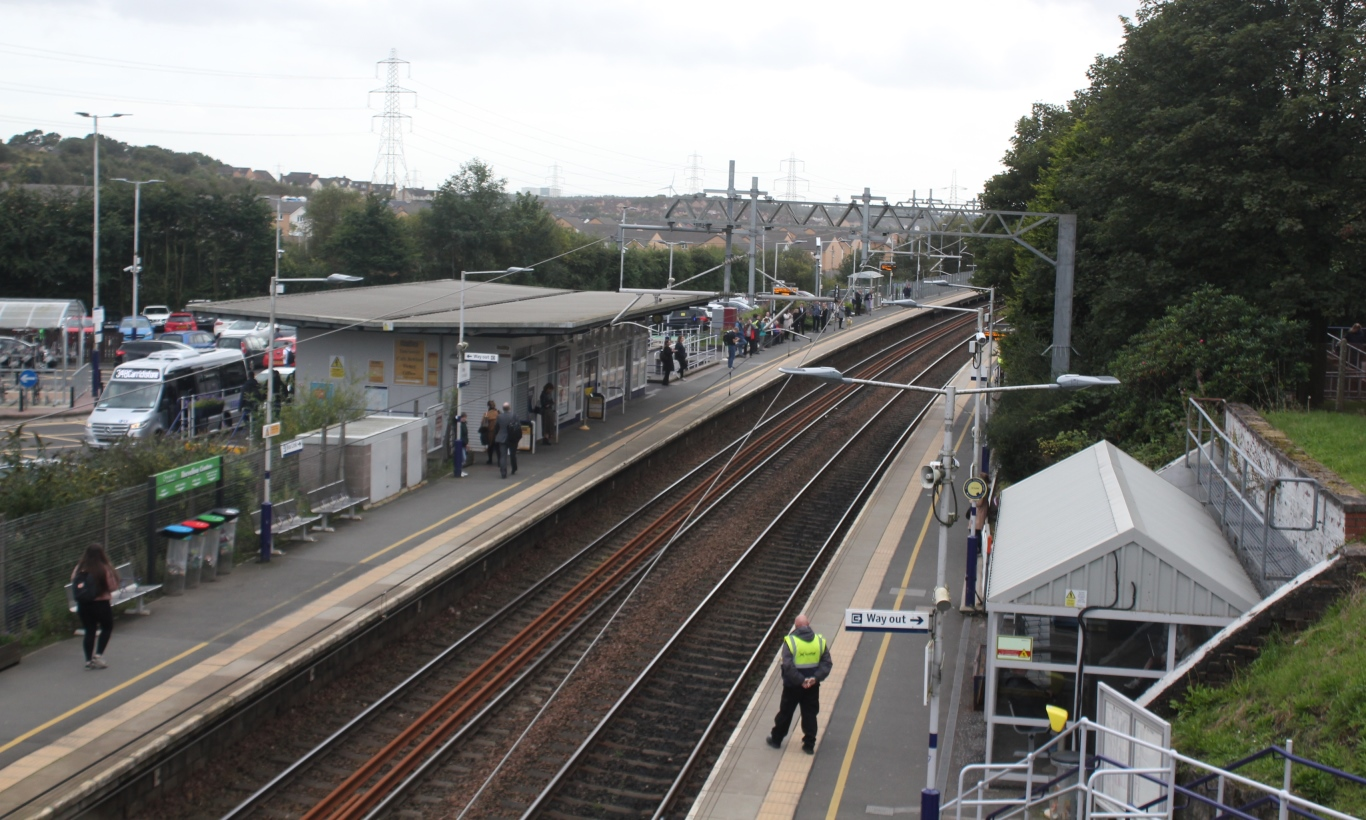
- 2019

General information
- Location: Croy, North Lanarkshire; Scotland
- Coordinates: 55.9555°N 4.0365°W
- Grid reference: NS729754
- Managed by: ScotRail
- Platforms: 2

Other information
- Station code: CRO

History
- Original company: Edinburgh and Glasgow Railway
- Pre-grouping: North British Railway
- Post-grouping: London and North Eastern Railway

Key dates
- 21 February 1842: Opened

Passengers
- 2020/21: ▼0.194 million
- 2021/22: ▲0.719 million
- 2022/23: ▲1.061 million
- 2023/24: ▲1.306 million
- 2024/25: ▲1.403 million
Location
Notes
- Passenger statistics from the Office of Rail and Road

Croy railway station serves the village of Croy – as well as the nearby town of Kilsyth and parts of Cumbernauld – in North Lanarkshire, Scotland. It is located on the Glasgow to Edinburgh via Falkirk Line, 11 1/2 miles (18.5 km) northeast of Glasgow Queen Street. The station services include the Glasgow–Edinburgh mainline and between Glasgow Queen Street and Stirling. Train services are provided by ScotRail.

== Facilities ==
The Edinburgh and Glasgow Railway station building has been demolished and replaced with a modern, glass and steel building designed by IDP Architects—adopted from the designs at the Bishopbriggs.

The station has park-and-ride facilities, with spaces for over 900 vehicles, including cycle parking and charging points for electrical vehicles. They have also placed bus connections from this station to Kilsyth and Cumbernauld. The lines through the station have been electrified as part of the Edinburgh to Glasgow Improvement Programme. The platform lengthening work has been carried out as part of this scheme.

In October 2022, an accessible footbridge, enabling step-free access to both platforms, was opened to the public for use.

== Services ==
=== 2011 ===
From Monday to Saturdays, there is a half-hourly service southbound to Glasgow Queen Street and northbound to Edinburgh. Moreover, the service runs every hour in each direction on evenings and Sundays.

There is also a half-hourly service to Stirling Monday to Saturday, which continues alternately to Alloa or Dunblane. This provides a second half-hourly service to Glasgow calling at both Lenzie and Bishopbriggs, giving a combined four trains an hour to Glasgow off peak. On Sundays, an hourly service operates between Glasgow and Alloa.

=== 2016 ===
The service includes half-hourly express to Queen Street and Edinburgh on the E&G main line in the daytime, and hourly during evenings and Sundays. Half-hourly (local) service each way on the Croy Line to Queen Street and to Stirling, then alternating to either Dunblane or Alloa. Hourly to Queen Street and Alloa on Sundays.

Preceding station	National Rail	Following station
Lenzie	ScotRail; Glasgow–Edinburgh via Falkirk line	Falkirk High
Lenzie	ScotRail; Croy Line	Larbert
	Historical railways	
Dullatur; Line open, station closed	North British Railway; Edinburgh and Glasgow Railway	Lenzie; Line and station open
Dullatur; Line open, station closed	North British Railway; Edinburgh and Glasgow Railway	Kirkintilloch (E&GR); Line open, station closed

== Electrification ==
As part of the Edinburgh to Glasgow Improvement Programme, the line through the station has been electrified.
