= Grangemouth branch railways =

Railway line in Scotland

The Grangemouth branch railways served Grangemouth docks on the Firth of Forth, Scotland, connecting the docks to the main line railway network. The first line was opened in 1860. The docks and the branch line developed considerably, and a second branch line was opened in 1911. Grangemouth docks was exceptionally busy during World War I, supplying the Grand Fleet.

The 1911 branch line closed in 1991, but the original section remains in use today for freight traffic.

== History ==
=== The Forth and Clyde Canal ===
The Forth and Clyde Canal opened in 1790, connecting the River Clyde at Bowling with the Firth of Forth at Grangemouth. As well as having a basin at Grangemouth, the canal company constructed facilities for transshipping from canal boats to sea-going vessels at Grangemouth. Much of the traffic was minerals and manufactured goods for export, including coastwise trade.

=== First railways ===
The Edinburgh and Glasgow Railway opened its main line in 1842, passing through Falkirk. To obtain access from the Edinburgh direction on to the Scottish Central Railway towards Stirling and Perth, the E&GR encouraged a nominally independent Stirlingshire Midland Junction Railway to build a line from Polmont to a junction near Larbert, via Grahamston (then a town in its own right, a little to the north of Falkirk). In fact the E&GR took over the SMJR company before the line was built. The line opened on 1 October 1850.

=== The first branch line ===
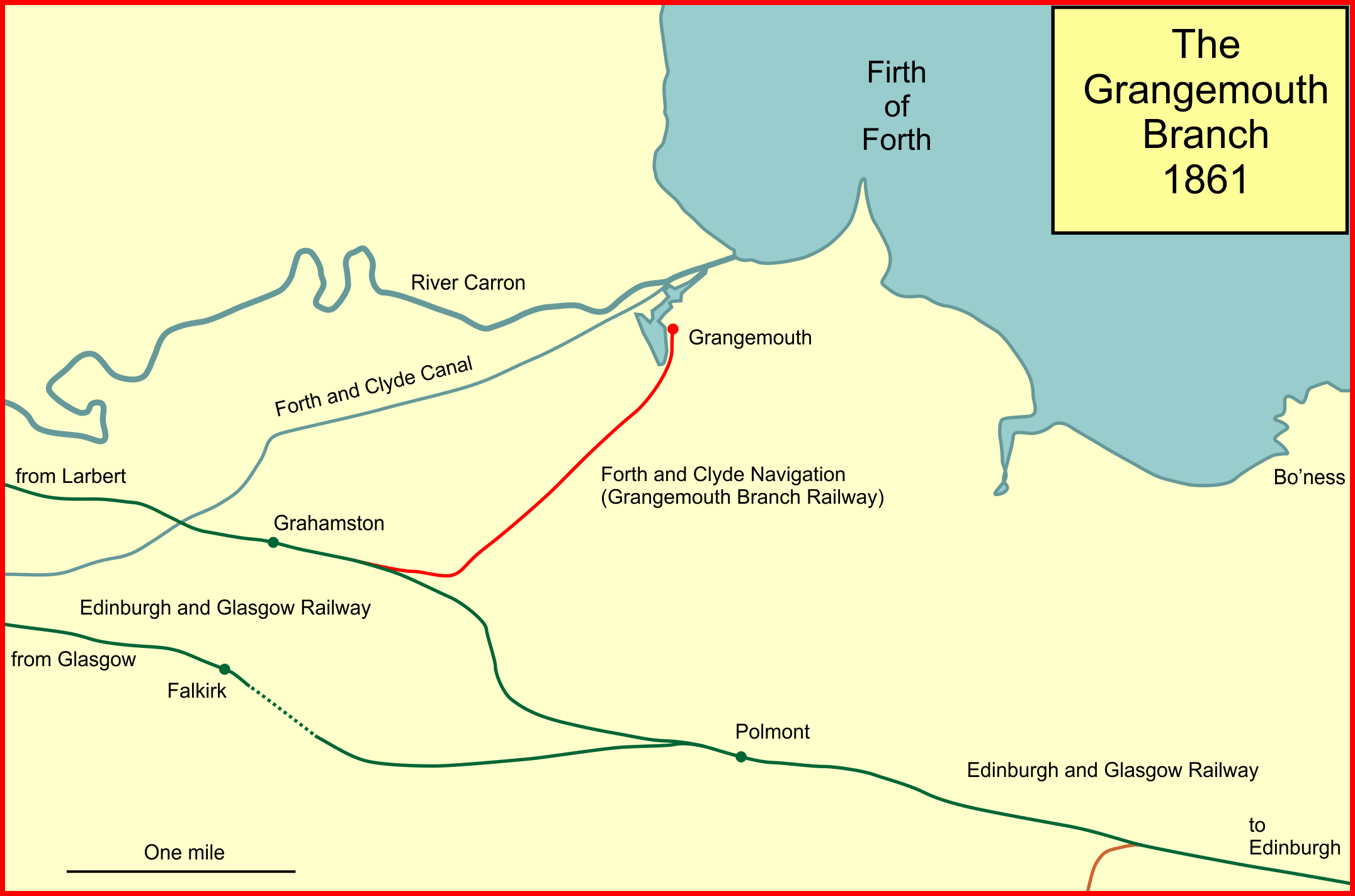
The Grangemouth branch line in 1861

It was the Forth and Clyde Canal which took the initiative to build a railway branch line into its harbour facility at Grangemouth. It built a single line from just east of Grahamston station to the harbour; the line opened in 1860 for goods, and for passengers on 1 November 1861. It was worked by the Edinburgh and Glasgow Railway.

Locomotives working the line between 1862 and 1867 were 'Carron' and 'Grange', both 0-4-0ST manufactured at the A Barclay & Co foundry in 1862. Subsequent numbers allocated by Caledonian Railway were 116 and 117 respectively.

=== Taken over by the Caledonian Railway ===
On 20 June 1867 the Forth and Clyde Navigation Act 1867 was passed, authorising the Caledonian Railway to acquire the Forth and Clyde Canal, as well as the Monkland Canal and the Forth and Cart Canal, and the railway branch line from Grahamston (Falkirk) to Grangemouth, as well as the Drumpeller Railway.

The capital value of the Forth and Clyde Canal was £1,141,333. The purchase price was calculated to guarantee the F&CC shareholders 6.5% on their shareholding, a little higher than their recent dividend level. As part of the authorising arrangements, the North British Railway(NBR)was given running powers over the branch line, and reciprocal powers were given to the Caledonian over the line from Grangemouth Junction to Larbert Junction. (NBR had promoted a branch line from Bo'ness to Grangemouth, and dropped the scheme on being given the running powers.) The line was operated by a manager responsible to the two railways companies jointly, and both companies ran passenger trains to Grangemouth. The Caledonian was now a canal and harbour owner, and did much to improve the facilities offered by those assets. Indeed, the improved waterway services abstracted some traffic from the parallel Kelvin Valley line.

=== Expansion at Grangemouth ===
On 3 June 1882, the Caledonian opened the new Carron Dock at Grangemouth. The port was capable of handling large steamships, and hydraulic coal elevators made rapid loading possible. Although the Act did not allow the Caledonian Railway to use the NBR Grahamston station, NBR conceded the use of it from 1 August 1883 after the Caledonian threatened to obtain powers to build an independent railway between Larbert and the Grangemouth branch. (Note: Ross does not say which Act, and this appears to contradict his statement on page 95, that the Caledonian already had the required running powers.) The port was said to be capable of handling a considerable additional volume of shipping, but already by 1893 "coal companies were demanding more quays at Grangemouth because of congestion in that port".

On 10 October 1906, a new Grange Dock was opened at Grangemouth. The harbour capacity was doubled, and ships of 7,000 tons could use the entrance lock. Considerable extra siding accommodation was provided over and above the marshalling sidings at Fouldubs. Eight hydraulic coal hoists were provided, each capable of handling 50 wagons an hour; there was a gravitational system to feed the wagons to the hoist and away again after discharge, and 120 hydraulic capstans were provided, substantially reducing the use of horses for wagon movements. A new quayside passenger platform was provided for occasional passenger use, replacing platforms originally placed at the Carron Dock for use by passengers on Carron Line ships to London.

=== Thornbridge station ===
A station was opened at Thornbridge on 1 December 1899 for the use of workmen, in connection with an adjacent factory not easily reached by road. It was not advertised in public timetables, and it closed on 1 August 1938.

=== A second branch line ===
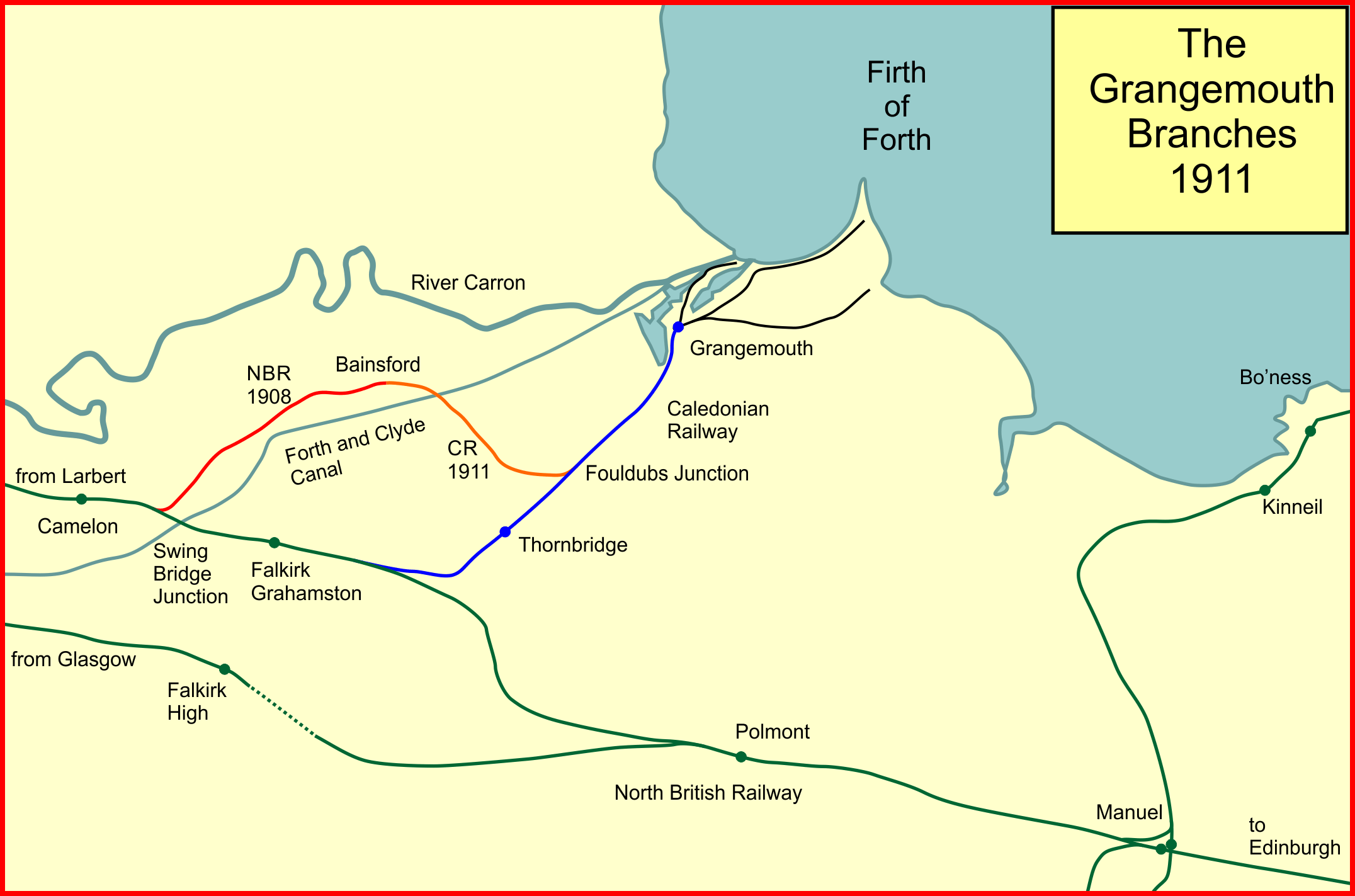
The Grangemouth branch lines in 1911

Grangemouth traffic continued to grow considerably, and the heavy traffic running through Grahamston was causing difficulty. A new connection was proposed, leaving the Grahamston line west of that station (at what became Swing Bridge Junction) and running via Bainsford, and joining the original branch line at Fouldubs. Agreement was reached that both the NBR and the Caledonian would build the branch, the section from Swing Bridge Junction to Bainsford being built by the NBR, and the eastern section from there to Fouldubs being built by the Caledonian Railway.

In fact the NBR section was completed in 1908, serving ironworks in the area of Bainsford. The Caledonian section was not opened until 1911, then completing the through route. There was a large swing bridge over the Forth and Clyde Canal. This section never carried local passenger trains.

=== World War I ===
On 4 August 1914 the United Kingdom declared war on Germany: World War I had started. The following day the Caledonian Railway received a letter from the War Office to inform it that it had been taken under Government control, pursuant to the Regulation of Railways Act 1871. Eight days after the declaration of war, Grangemouth Docks were declared a military area, and access was only permitted on production of an official pass. The Grand Fleet was based at Scapa Flow in the Orkney Islands, and on a wartime footing it had a huge demand for fuel, provisions and other supplies, that the Highland Railway and the northern port facilities were incapable of handling. Grangemouth became the effective railhead for the fleet, and so-called Jellicoe Specials (named after the Commander in Chief of the Grand Fleet, Admiral Jellicoe), conveyed steam coal from South Wales. (Note: Although Jacky Fisher had urged the adoption of oil fuel for the Dreadnought class of battleships, this was only partly adopted and the Grand Fleet still relied largely on coal fuel at the time.)

From 15 January 1915 Aberdeen was designated as the prime railhead for bulk supplies to the Grand Fleet, except for fuel. Grangemouth continued to handle the fuel supplies, in addition to a wide diversity of other supplies. Between March and June 1915, 8,000 tons of flour was stored in seven sheds; and in 1915 - 1916 19,000 tons of hay (for feed for horses on active service) were delivered by rail. Grange Dock warehouses were requisitioned by the Admiralty as a mine depot from January 1916, and during the remainder of hostilities handled 57,600 tons of the munitions. The trains were handled by Admiralty locomotives within the harbour area.

A victualling yard occupying five warehouse sheds was established in June 1916 at Carron Dock; during the remainder of the war it handled 51,000 tons of supplies. During the war the docks handled 2,306,000 tons of coal. A temporary station was opened in the dock area, to enable the greatly increased dock workforce to travel to and from their work; there were four daily trains from Grahamston. After the armistice of 11 November 1918, this station was the departure point for 27 special trains during December 1918 and January 1919, carrying men who were being demobilised from the Grand Fleet.

The Port was returned to the control of the Caledonian Railway on 25 December 1918, although the Admiralty retained a presence for a further three months.

=== After 1919 ===
The railway resumed peacetime operation, but the Government reorganised the railways into four "groups" by the Railways Act 1921; the Caledonian Railway was a constituent of the new London Midland and Scottish Railway (LMS), and the NBR a constituent of the London and North Eastern Railway (LNER) from 1923. The Grangemouth Branch Railway therefore remained a separate joint undertaking.

The peak period of Scottish coal exports had passed, and the volume of material handled declined steadily. During World War II the geographical emphasis of naval activity was elsewhere, and the heavy use of Grangemouth was not repeated. After nationalisation of the railways in 1948, the area was under the control of the Scottish Region of British Railways. Changing social patterns, the rise of efficient and cheap bus services, and the further decline of the port activity resulted in attrition of the passenger services, which finally closed on 29 January 1968.

At that time the western section of the line from Swing Bridge Junction closed; the remaining operational section was from Fouldubs Junction to the Orchardhall Aluminium Rolling Mill. This closed in 1991, and the branch section closed with it.

The line to Grangemouth freight terminal was electrified in 2019.

== The present day ==
The section of line from Grangemouth Junction to Grangemouth remains open for freight traffic. The Forth Port Authority now control the harbour area; there is also an oil terminal.
