= Falkirk High railway station =

Railway station in Falkirk, Scotland

Falkirk High Scottish Gaelic: Bràighe na h-Eaglaise Brice
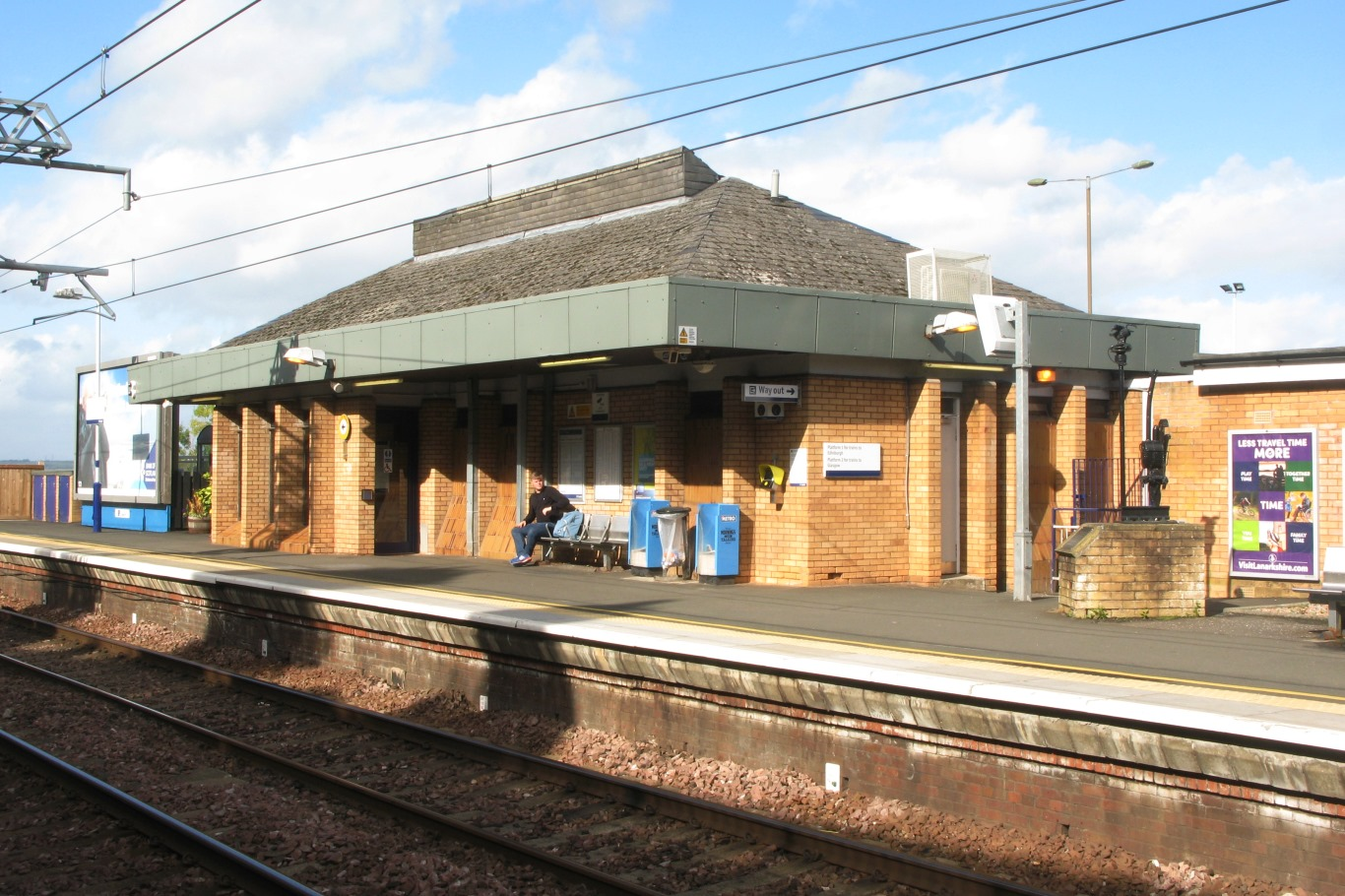

General information
- Location: Falkirk, Falkirk; Scotland
- Coordinates: 55.9917°N 3.7924°W
- Grid reference: NS882791
- Manager: ScotRail
- Platforms: 2

Other information
- Station code: FKK

History
- Original company: Edinburgh and Glasgow Railway
- Pre-grouping: North British Railway
- Post-grouping: London and North Eastern Railway

Key dates
- 21 February 1842: Opened as Falkirk
- 1 February 1903: Renamed as Falkirk High

Passengers
- 2020/21: ▼0.117 million
- Interchange: ▼534
- 2021/22: ▲0.432 million
- Interchange: ▲3,034
- 2022/23: ▲0.617 million
- Interchange: ▼2,189
- 2023/24: ▲0.733 million
- Interchange: ▲3,227
- 2024/25: ▲0.773 million
- Interchange: ▲3,274
Location
Notes
- Passenger statistics from the Office of Rail and Road

Falkirk High railway station is one of two railway stations serving the town of Falkirk in Scotland. It is on the Glasgow to Edinburgh via Falkirk Line and situated on the southern edge of the town, close to the Union Canal.

Falkirk is also served by the railway station at Falkirk Grahamston.

== History ==
The station was opened as Falkirk with the Edinburgh and Glasgow Railway on 21 February 1842. Edinburgh-bound services initially terminated at Haymarket, but were subsequently extended to the North British Railway's station at Edinburgh Waverley in 1846. The NBR took over operations in 1865 when it absorbed the E&GR, with the London and North Eastern Railway succeeding it at the 1923 Grouping.

In 1903, the station was renamed as Falkirk High recognising it being one of several stations in the town (the others being Falkirk Grahamston and Camelon on the Polmont to Larbert/Greenhill loop line) and its location above the town.

== Services ==
Services at Falkirk High are mostly operated by ScotRail, with a number of additional services operated by Lumo.

The typical off-peak service in trains per hour is:

- 2 tph to Glasgow Queen Street
- 2 tph to Edinburgh Waverley

Additional trains operate during peak hours, increasing the service up to 4 tph in each direction.

There is also a small number of Lumo services which call at the station during the evening, with 2 trains per day to Glasgow Queen Street and 1 train to London King's Cross via Edinburgh Waverley and Newcastle

Preceding station	National Rail	Following station
Polmont	ScotRail; Glasgow to Edinburgh via Falkirk Line	Croy
Haymarket	Lumo; Glasgow - London	Glasgow Queen Street
	Historical railways	
Polmont; Line and station open	North British Railway; Edinburgh and Glasgow Railway	Bonnybridge High; Line open, station closed

== Statue ==
Falkirk High station is home to the metal sculpture of "Antonine the Legendary Engine" by George Wyllie. This sculpture is of sufficient importance to be listed and protected by the Railway Heritage Committee.
