= Camelon railway station =

Railway station in Falkirk, Scotland

Camelon Scottish Gaelic: Camalan
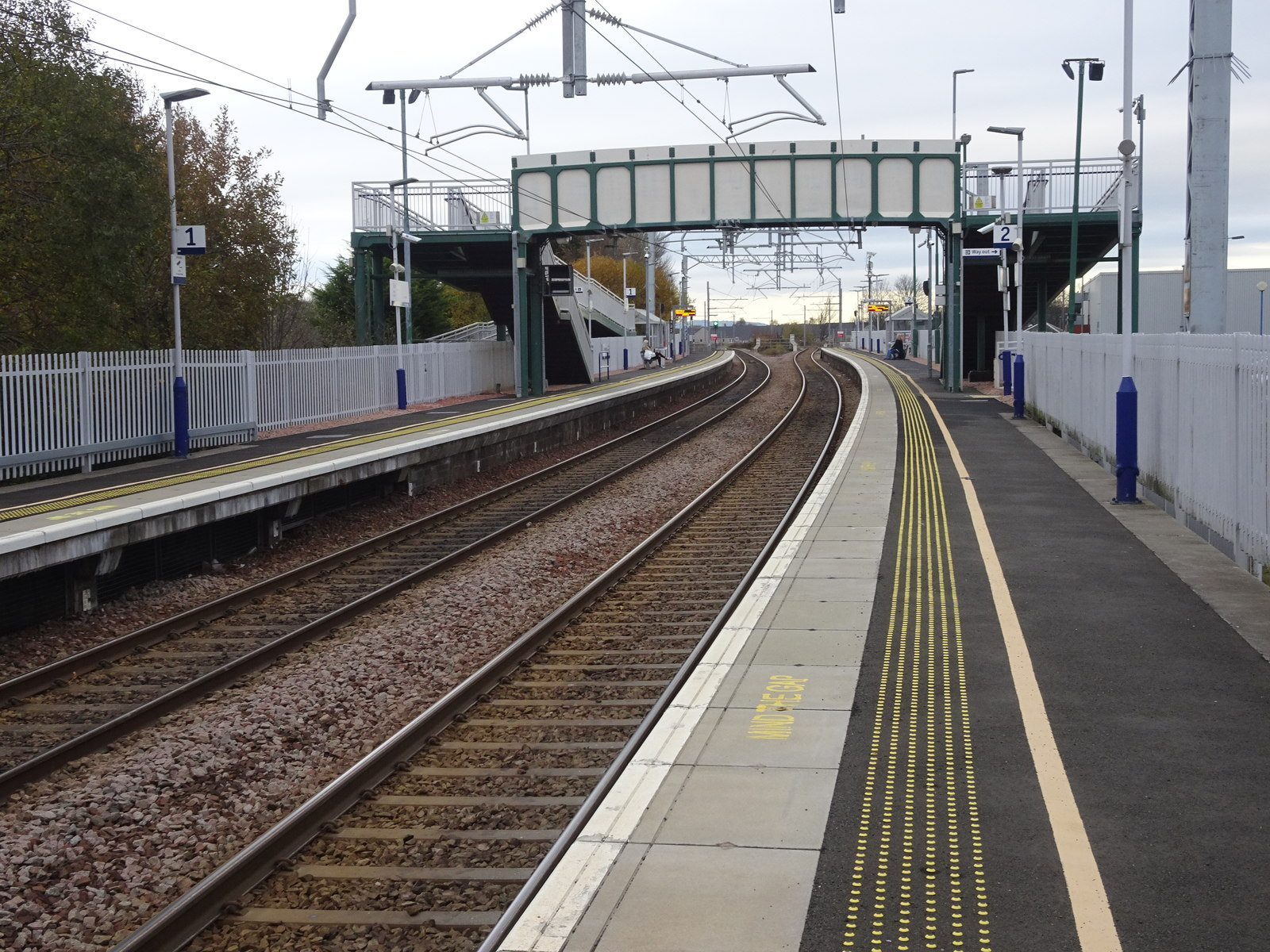
- Camelon railway station in 2018, following electrification

General information
- Location: Camelon, Falkirk; Scotland
- Coordinates: 56.0062°N 3.8182°W
- Grid reference: NS867807
- Managed by: ScotRail
- Platforms: 2

Other information
- Station code: CMO

History
- Original company: Railtrack

Key dates
- 1850: Opened as Camelon
- 1903: Renamed Falkirk (Camelon)
- 4 September 1967: Closed
- 4 October 1994: Reopened as Camelon

Passengers
- 2020/21: ▼24,596
- 2021/22: ▲94,790
- 2022/23: ▲0.125 million
- 2023/24: ▲0.153 million
- 2024/25: ▲0.166 million
Location
Notes
- Passenger statistics from the Office of Rail and Road

Camelon railway station is a railway station serving the suburb of Camelon in Falkirk, Scotland. It is located on the Edinburgh-Dunblane and Cumbernauld Lines. Train services are provided by ScotRail. The present station was opened in 1994.

== History ==
The original station at Camelon, opened in 1850 and closed on 4 September 1967, was located about 250 yards (230 m) east of the present station. It was called Camelon from its opening until 1903 when it was called Falkirk (Camelon) until its closure. The old station was a simple island platform with a ticket office and waiting room; access was from under the station via a set of stairs that led from a roadbridge.

The modern station has all the trappings of a 21st-century station, with both platforms accessible by wheelchair users, extensive use of CCTV and help points. There is free parking owned by the local authority adjacent to the south platform. This serves the nearby leisure facilities.

== Services ==
From Camelon, direct train services run to Glasgow (via Cumbernauld), Edinburgh and Dunblane, with a change required at Stirling for trains to Perth, Dundee, Aberdeen and Inverness, change at Glasgow or Edinburgh for trains to the south of Scotland and to England.

Trains on the Edinburgh – Dunblane route run every half hour and those to Cumbernauld and Glasgow run hourly. There are no Glasgow trains on Sundays, whilst the Edinburgh to Dunblane route operates hourly each way.

Preceding station	National Rail	Following station
Falkirk Grahamston	ScotRail; Edinburgh–Dunblane Line	Larbert
Cumbernauld	ScotRail; Cumbernauld Line	Falkirk Grahamston
