= Upper Greenhill railway station =

Disused railway station near Bonnybridge, Scotland

Coordinates: 55.9859°N 3.9020°W

Upper Greenhill

General information
- Location: Greenhill, Falkirk; Scotland
- Platforms: 2

Other information
- Status: Disused

History
- Original company: Edinburgh and Glasgow Railway
- Pre-grouping: North British Railway

Key dates
- July 1848: Opened as Scottish Central Junction
- August 1855: Name changed to Greenhill Junction
- August 1864: Name changed to Upper Greenhill
- September 1865: Closed
Location

Upper Greenhill railway station served the village of Greenhill, Falkirk, Scotland from 1848 to 1865 on the Edinburgh and Glasgow Railway.

== History ==
The station opened as Scottish Central Junction in July 1848 by the North British Railway. There were sidings to the north and to the south; only the southern sidings remain today. The station's name was changed to Greenhill Junction in August 1855 and changed again to Upper Greenhill in August 1864. The station closed in September 1865.

Preceding station	Historical railways	Following station
Bonnybridge High; Line open, station closed	North British Railway; Edinburgh and Glasgow Railway	Castlecary; Line open, station closed
