= Cumbernauld Line =

Railroad line in Glasgow, Scotland

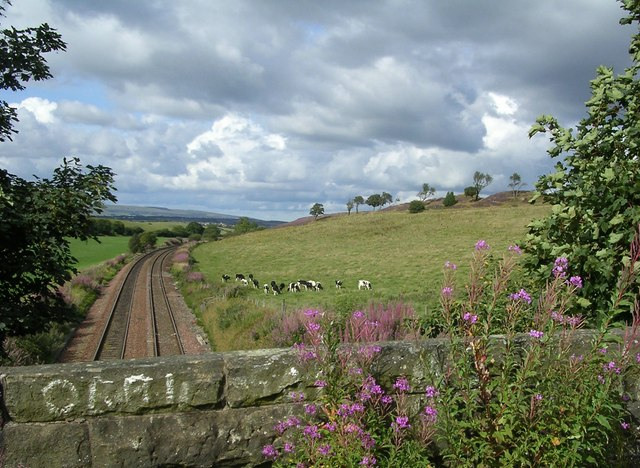
- Route near Greenfoot in 2006

Overview
- Status: Operational
- Owner: Network Rail
- Locale: Glasgow; Scotland

Service
- Type: Heavy rail
- System: National Rail
- Operator: ScotRail

Technical
- Track gauge: 1,435 mm (4 ft 8 1/2 in)
Route map
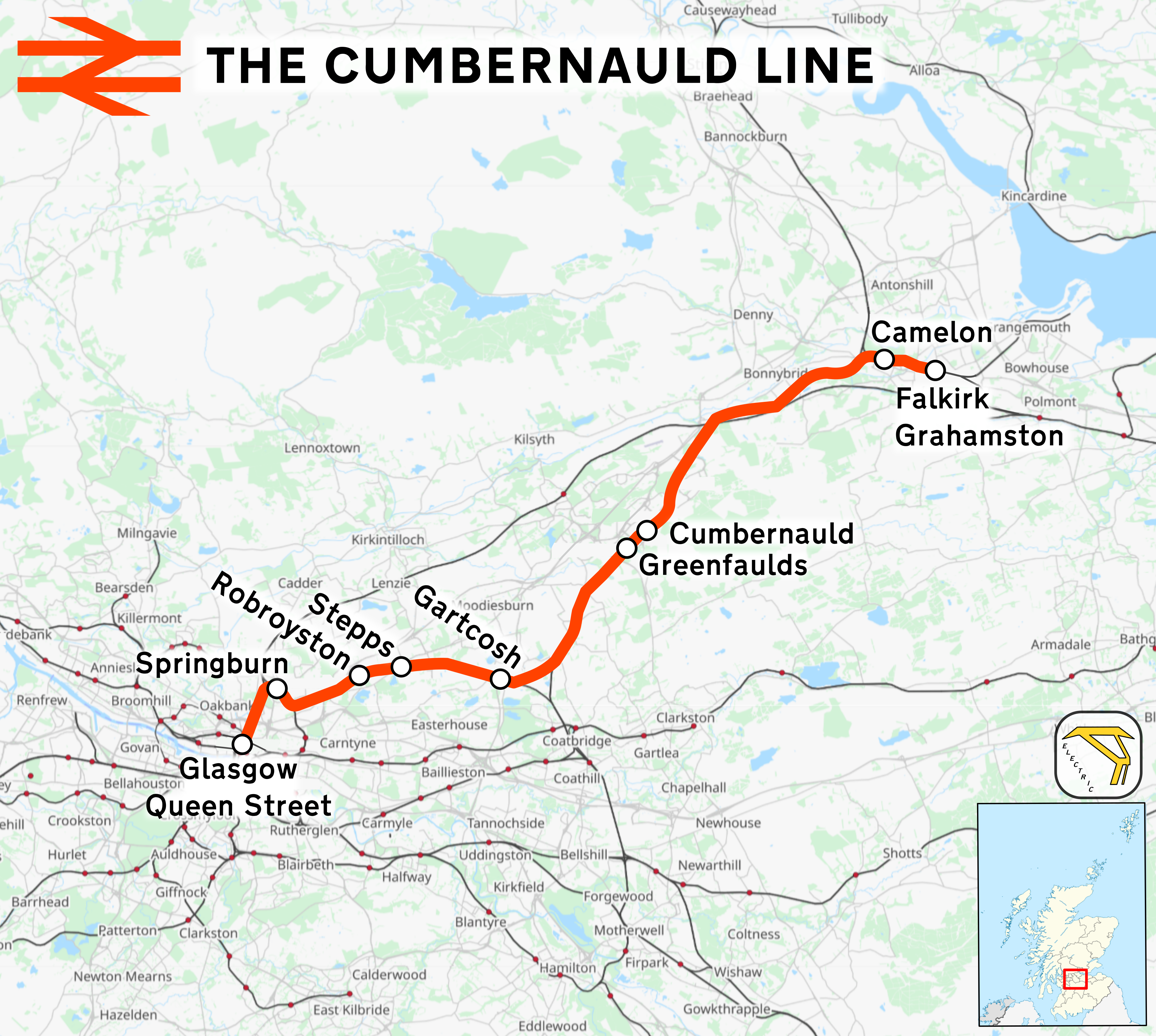
(Click to expand)

The Cumbernauld Line is a suburban railway line linking Glasgow to Falkirk via Cumbernauld in Scotland. Since May 2014, the newly electrified track between Springburn and Cumbernauld has become an extension of the North Clyde network.

== Services ==
All passenger services on this Line are operated by ScotRail.

Following electrification between June 2013 and May 2014, Cumbernauld services became an extension of the North Clyde Line's Springburn Branch. Services from Cumbernauld arrived at Glasgow Queen Street Low Level platforms, freeing up capacity in the High Level station. Due to cancellation of the Garngad Chord, trains must reverse from Springburn.

All services now use Class 385 EMUs instead of diesel units.

== Abandoned plans ==
Allandale railway station (55°59′6″N 3°55′47″W) was a rail station proposed for the line between Cumbernauld and Falkirk near the villages of Allandale and Castlecary. The station was recommended in the Scottish Executive's "Central Scotland Transport Corridor Studies", published in January 2003 as Castlecary railway station. However, the scheme's promoters were persuaded to change the name of the station to avoid confusion with an existing Castle Cary railway station in Castle Cary, Somerset.

The proposed Allandale station was to have been sited on the former Castlecary brickworks. Services intended for the station included those from Glasgow Queen Street to Falkirk Grahamston; a new service from the station to Queen Street; and a half-hourly service between Motherwell and Stirling.

Plans for the station were abandoned in favour of an alternative park and ride facility at Bannockburn, according to Scottish Parliament written answers for 23 August 2007.

== Future developments ==
Upon completion of the Edinburgh to Glasgow Improvement Programme, a series of Diversionary Route electrification projects have been outlined for completion in 2018. These plans include full electrification between Cumbernauld and Falkirk Grahamston.

With the cancellation of the Garngad Chord in November 2011, the potential to remove the timely reversing procedure at Springburn is still an option.

There are also tentative plans to extend passenger services from Falkirk to Grangemouth, a town which lost its train service in January 1968. This is an idea put forward by Network Rail to improve freight access and is supported by Falkirk Council, who are currently undertaking a feasibility study into the project's potential.
