= Edinburgh–Dunblane line =

Railway line in Scotland

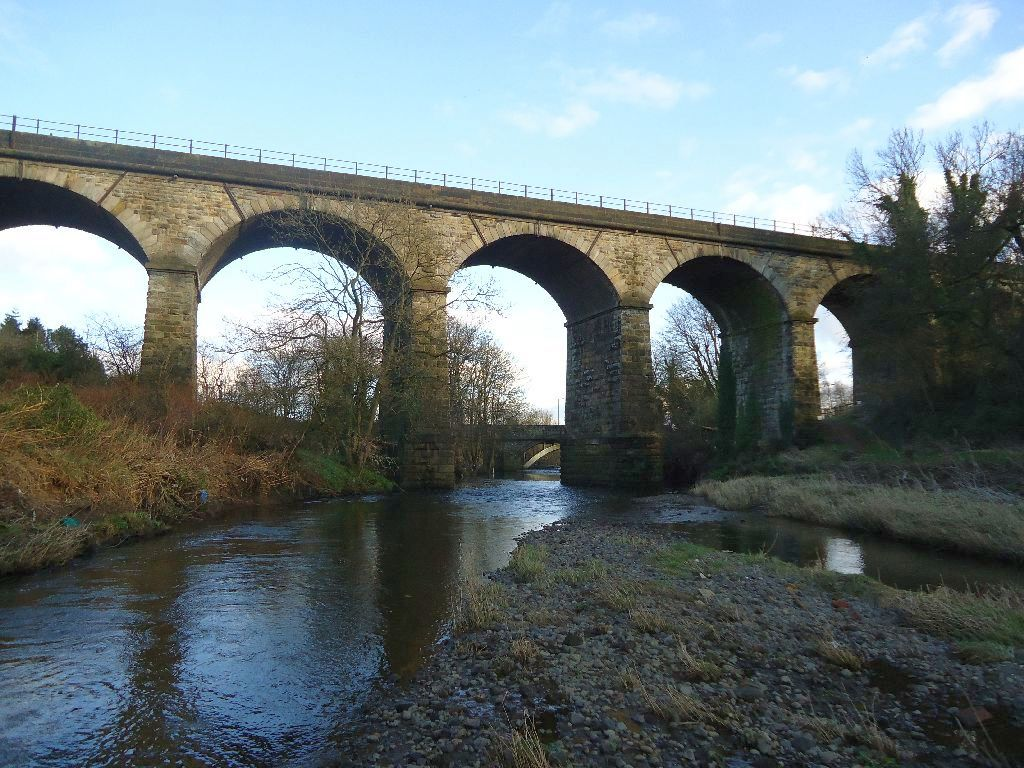
- The Larbert Viaduct over the River Carron

Overview
- Owner: National Rail
- Locale: Edinburgh; Falkirk; Stirling; Scotland

Service
- System: National Rail
- Operator(s): ScotRail

Technical
- Track gauge: 4 ft 8 1/2 in (1,435 mm)
Route map
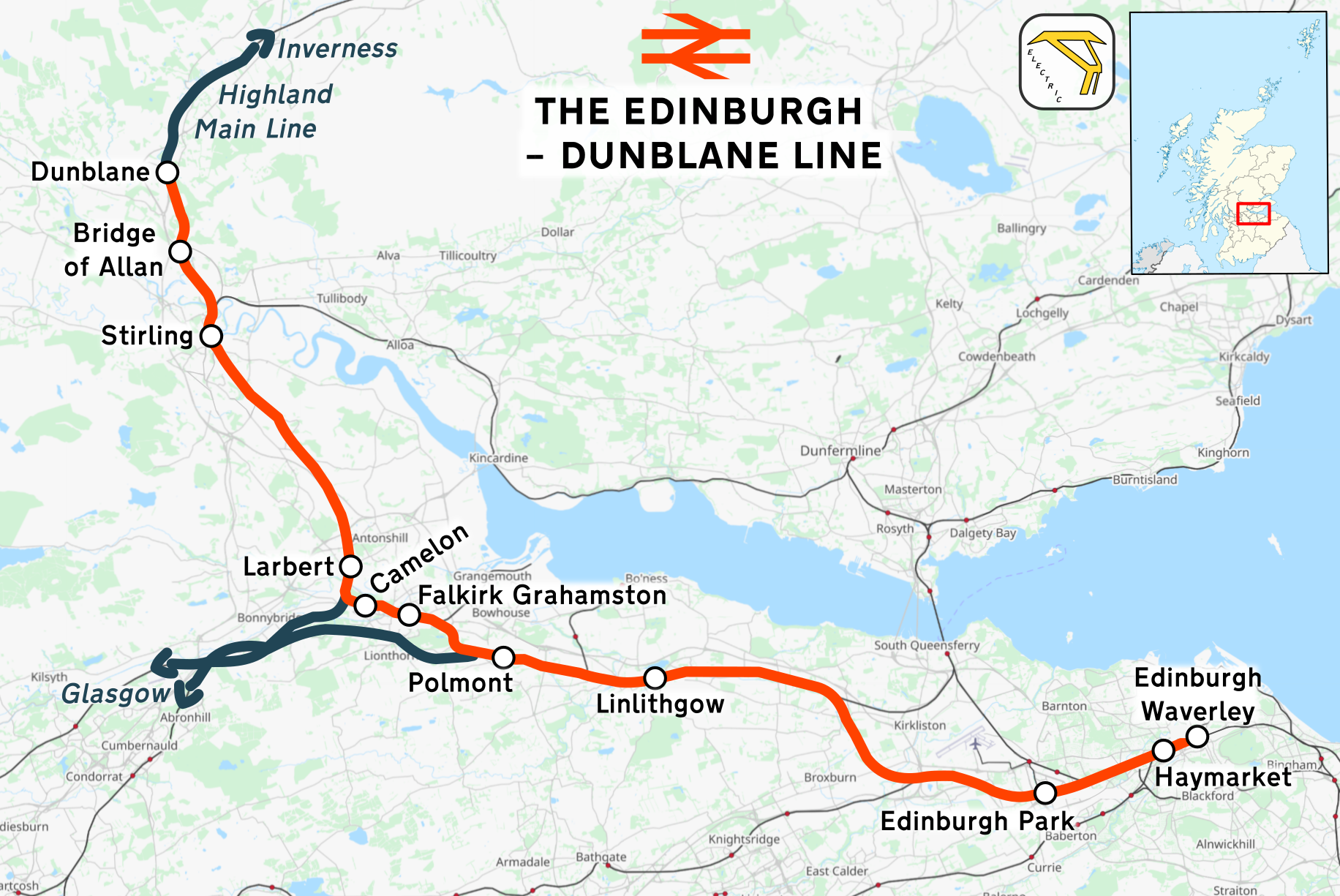
(Click to expand)

The Edinburgh–Dunblane line is a railway line in East Central Scotland. It links the city of Edinburgh via Falkirk to the city of Stirling and the town of Dunblane.

== Service provision ==
=== Connections to other services ===
This line connects into other services in several locations:

- Dunblane – Highland Main Line
- Stirling – Croy Line
- Larbert – Croy Line
- Camelon – Cumbernauld Line
- Polmont – Glasgow–Edinburgh via Falkirk line
- Edinburgh Park – North Clyde Line
- Haymarket – Fife Circle Line, Edinburgh to Aberdeen Line, Shotts Line, West Coast Main Line
- Edinburgh Waverley – Borders Railway, North Berwick Line, East Coast Main Line

=== Scotrail service from 2004 to 2018 ===
The services on this line were run by First ScotRail until 2015, then by Abellio ScotRail. The vast majority of services were worked by Class 158 and Class 170 DMUs, with some services being provided by Class 156s. Until the opening of the Borders Railway in 2015, the line joined the Edinburgh Crossrail at Edinburgh Park.

=== ScotRail service from 2018 ===
Following completion of electrification of the line between Polmont Junction through Stirling and to Dunblane, Abellio Scotrail commenced electrified passenger services with the timetable change of 9 December 2018. The service continued to make use of some diesel traction, with Class 365 units providing electric services until March 2019, after which all services were taken over by Class 385s. The timetable change also saw the Polmont and Linlithgow stops removed from the Monday-Saturday daytime stopping pattern, being replaced by the new Edinburgh-Glasgow service running via the Cumbernauld Line.

In April 2022, Scottish Government-owned ScotRail took over the operation of the line from Abellio ScotRail.

== History ==
The route built in several stages:

- Edinburgh and Glasgow Railway between Edinburgh Waverley railway station and Haymarket in 1846.
- Edinburgh and Glasgow Railway between Haymarket and Polmont on 21 February 1842.
- Stirlingshire Midland Junction Railway between Polmont and Carmuirs / Larbert Junctions in 1850
- Scottish Central Railway between Carmuirs / Larbert Junctions and Dunblane in 1847

== Electrification ==
The line was electrified as part of the rolling programme of electrification in Scotland's Central Belt in 2018.

== Sources ==
- Awdry, Christopher (1990). Encyclopaedia of British Railway Companies. Sparkford: Patrick Stephens Ltd. ISBN 1-8526-0049-7. OCLC 19514063. CN 8983.
- Jowett, Alan (March 1989). Jowett's Railway Atlas of Great Britain and Ireland: From Pre-Grouping to the Present Day (1st ed.). Sparkford: Patrick Stephens Ltd. ISBN 978-1-85260-086-0. OCLC 22311137.
- Jowett, Alan (2000). Jowett's Nationalised Railway Atlas (1st ed.). Penryn, Cornwall: Atlantic Transport Publishers. ISBN 978-0-906899-99-1. OCLC 228266687.
- Yonge, John (May 1987). Gerald Jacobs (ed.). British Rail Track Diagrams - Book 1: ScotRail (1st ed.). Exeter: Quail Map Company. ISBN 0-9006-0948-6.
- Yonge, John (February 1993). Gerald Jacobs (ed.). Railway Track Diagrams - Book 1: Scotland and the Isle of Man (2nd ed.). Exeter: Quail Map Company. ISBN 0-9006-0995-8.
- Yonge, John (April 1996). Gerald Jacobs (ed.). Railway Track Diagrams - Book 1: Scotland and the Isle of Man (3rd ed.). Exeter: Quail Map Company. ISBN 1-8983-1919-7.
- Yonge, John (2007). Gerald Jacobs (ed.). Railway Track Diagrams - Book 1: Scotland & Isle of Man (Quail Track Plans) (fifth ed.). Bradford on Avon: Trackmaps (formerly Quail Map Co). ISBN 978-0-9549866-3-6. OCLC 79435248.
