= First ScotRail =

Scottish train operating company, 2004-2015

- Rèile na h-Alba (Scottish Gaelic)

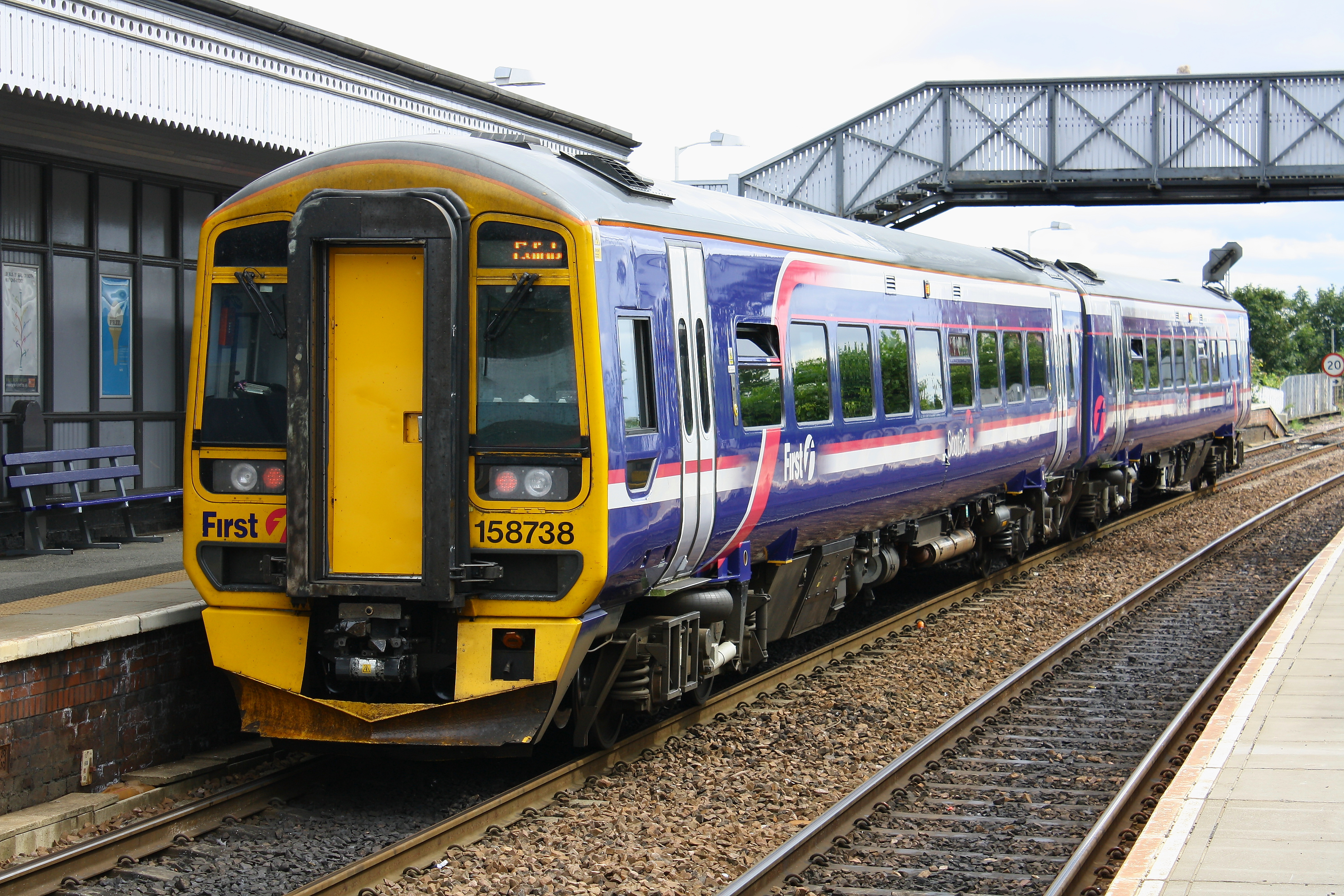
- Class 158 Express Sprinter at North Queensferry in 2009

Overview
- Franchises: ScotRail; 17 October 2004 – 31 March 2015
- Main region: Scotland
- Other regions: North West England; North East England
- Fleet: 311
- Stations operated: 344
- Parent company: FirstGroup
- Reporting mark: SR
- Predecessor: ScotRail (National Express)
- Successor: Abellio ScotRail; Caledonian Sleeper

Technical
- Length: 3,032.0 km (1,884.0 mi)

Other
- Website: www.scotrail.co.uk at the Wayback Machine (archived 2015-03-16)

First ScotRail was a Scottish train operating company owned by FirstGroup. It operated the ScotRail franchise between October 2004 and March 2015.

On 17 October 2004, First ScotRail took over operations from the incumbent franchisee, National Express. First ScotRail operated most commuter and long-distance services within Scotland, and some services to northern England, as well as the Caledonian Sleeper to London. Of FirstGroup's four train operating companies, ScotRail was the second largest (in terms of number of passenger journeys 2013–14) after First Great Western at the time of the termination of its franchise.

During April 2008, Transport Scotland granted a three-year franchise extension to First ScotRail. In May 2009, First ScotRail announced a crackdown on fare-dodging due to abuse of the Flexipass ticket system. One month later, it was alleged that ScotRail's passenger figures were substantially inflated and that 7.2 million less passenger journeys had been actually made; the matter became politically charged but did not impact the extension decision. In June 2012, the Scottish Government announced that the Caledonian Sleeper services would be split off from the ScotRail franchise. Following its unsuccessful bid to retain the franchise in 2014, First ScotRail transferred operations to Abellio ScotRail on 1 April 2015.

== History ==
First ScotRail logo (2004–2008)

Between March 1997 and October 2004, the public transport conglomerate National Express operated the ScotRail franchise under the ScotRail brand. During July 2003, the Scottish Executive and the Strategic Rail Authority announced Arriva, FirstGroup and National Express had been shortlisted to bid for the new franchise. In June 2004, the franchise was awarded to FirstGroup; the services formerly operated by ScotRail were transferred to First ScotRail on 17 October 2004.

On 1 January 2006, Transport Scotland was established to carry out the Scottish Executive's transport responsibilities including its then newly devolved powers over rail franchising. During April 2008, Transport Scotland granted a three-year franchise extension to First ScotRail, postponing its end-date to November 2014.

In May 2009, First ScotRail announced a crackdown on fare-dodging shortly after discovering that one of its most popular saver tickets could be subject to widespread abuse; 150 travellers were caught misusing Flexipass tickets within a single week alone. First ScotRail's approach to dealing with fare-dodgers remained a point of controversy at times.

During June 2009, a report by Strathclyde Partnership for Transport alleged that passenger figures generated by ScotRail had contained 7.2 million more passenger journeys than had been actually made; in response, Holyrood's audit committee called in Auditor General Robert Black to review the extent of the miscalculation. First ScotRail stated that the "long-standing" error was being corrected, while Transport Scotland contended that the overestimate did not impact its decision to extend the ScotRail franchise.

During October 2011, First ScotRail and the British railway infrastructure operator Network Rail announced the enactment of a series of new measures to handle service disruption in the event of severe winter conditions. In addition to improved access to travel information at stations and aboard trains, a new design of warmed plastic tunnels along with the first "power shower" system in the UK were rolled out to help de-ice trains, while it was stated that priority would be given to keeping the most highly-trafficked routes operational. At times of severe weather, ScotRail services had been temporarily suspended on grounds of safety; in such situations, wherever possible, active trains were directed to stop in the nearest convenient station and alternative transportation was provided until services could be resumed.

In June 2012, the Scottish Government announced that when the ScotRail franchise would be re-tendered in 2014, the Caledonian Sleeper services would be split off and transferred to a standalone franchise. In May 2014, it was announced that the new Caledonian Sleeper franchise had been awarded to Serco.

In addition to FirstGroup, multiple other transport companies entered bids to operate the ScotRail franchise, including Abellio, Arriva, MTR, and National Express. During early October 2014, it was announced that Abellio's bid had been selected and thus First ScotRail would be discontinued from April 2015.

Accordingly, the franchise was transferred to Abellio ScotRail at midnight on 1 April 2015. Several hours beforehand, the Caledonian Sleeper services had been separately transferred to Serco.

== Services ==
=== Main lines ===
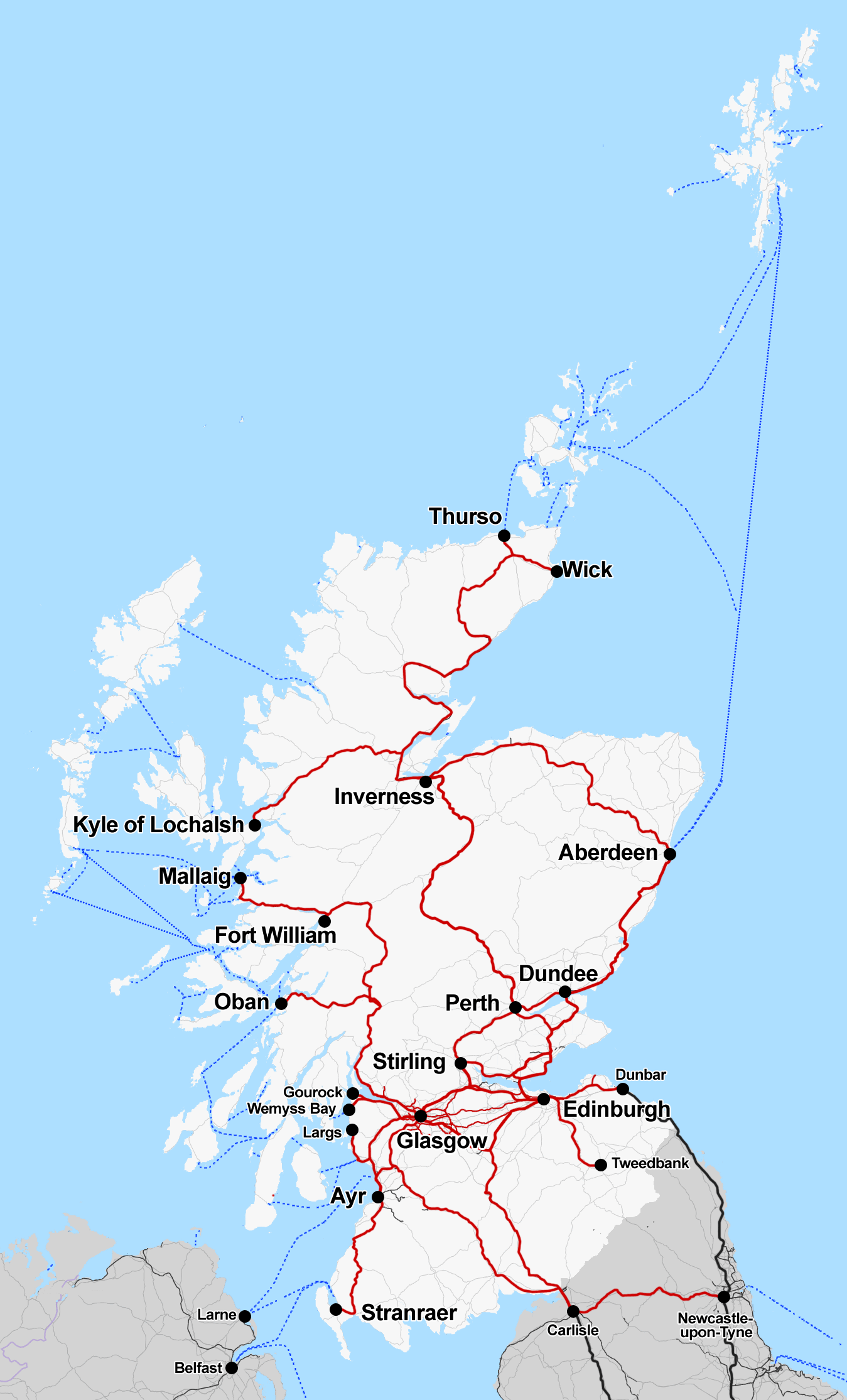
Map of the principal railway lines of Scotland; First ScotRail's former services are indicated in red.

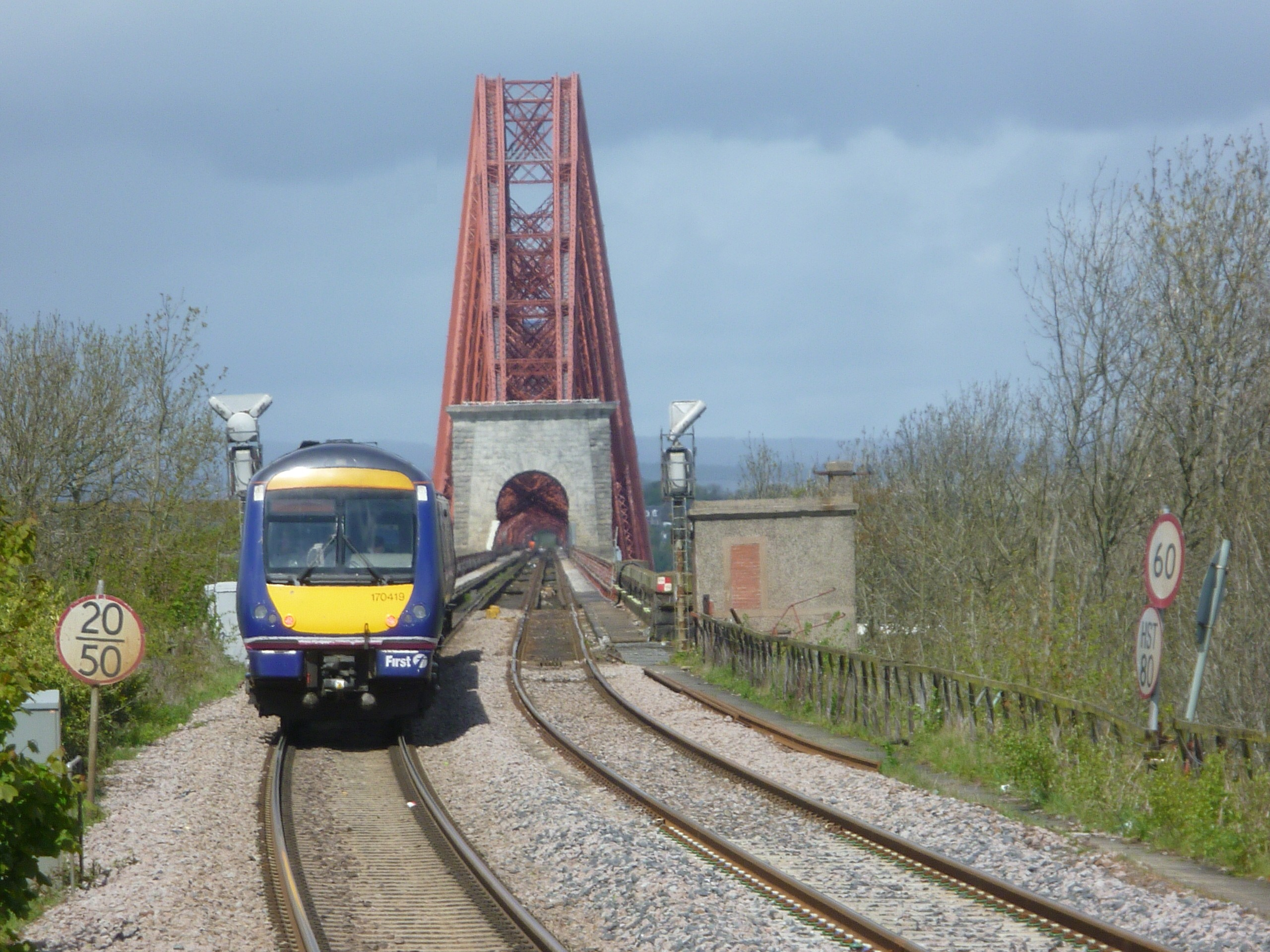
Northbound Class 170 approaching the Forth Bridge on the Edinburgh to Aberdeen Line

Express trains operated between Edinburgh, Glasgow, Inverness, Dundee and Aberdeen. The Highland Main Line links Inverness to the south. Some stretches of main line, such as the Highland Main Line, are single track, and express trains must call at intermediate stations to permit trains coming in the opposite direction to pass.

The main lines of Scotland are:

- Ayrshire Coast Line
- Dundee–Aberdeen line
- Edinburgh–Dundee line
- Fife Circle Line
- Glasgow–Edinburgh via Carstairs line
- Glasgow–Edinburgh via Falkirk line
- Glasgow–Dundee line
- Glasgow South Western Line
- Highland Main Line

=== Glasgow ===
The densest part of the network was the suburban network around Glasgow, with 183 stations, the second-largest suburban rail network in the UK, after London. Much of it is 25 kV AC electrified. Glasgow's main terminal stations are Central and Queen Street stations. ScotRail operated trains in this area under the Strathclyde Partnership for Transport (SPT) brand. However, the Strathclyde Partnership for Transport no longer has any input into specifying rail services in the Glasgow area. DMUs and EMUs that were liveried in the carmine and cream livery were stripped of the Strathclyde logos. Lines in and around Glasgow were:

- Argyle Line
- Ayrshire Coast Line
- Cathcart Circle Lines
- Croy Line
- Cumbernauld Line
- Inverclyde Line
- Maryhill Line
- Motherwell–Cumbernauld line
- North Clyde Line (extended to Cumbernauld & Edinburgh)
- Paisley Canal line
- Shotts Line
- Glasgow South Western Line
- Whifflet Line (incorporated into the Argyle Line)

The North Clyde Line is now linked to the Edinburgh-Bathgate Line (see Edinburgh, below) with the completion of the Airdrie–Bathgate rail link, creating a new direct link between Glasgow and Edinburgh. There is also a proposal to create a new rail link across the city with the Crossrail Glasgow project.

=== Edinburgh ===
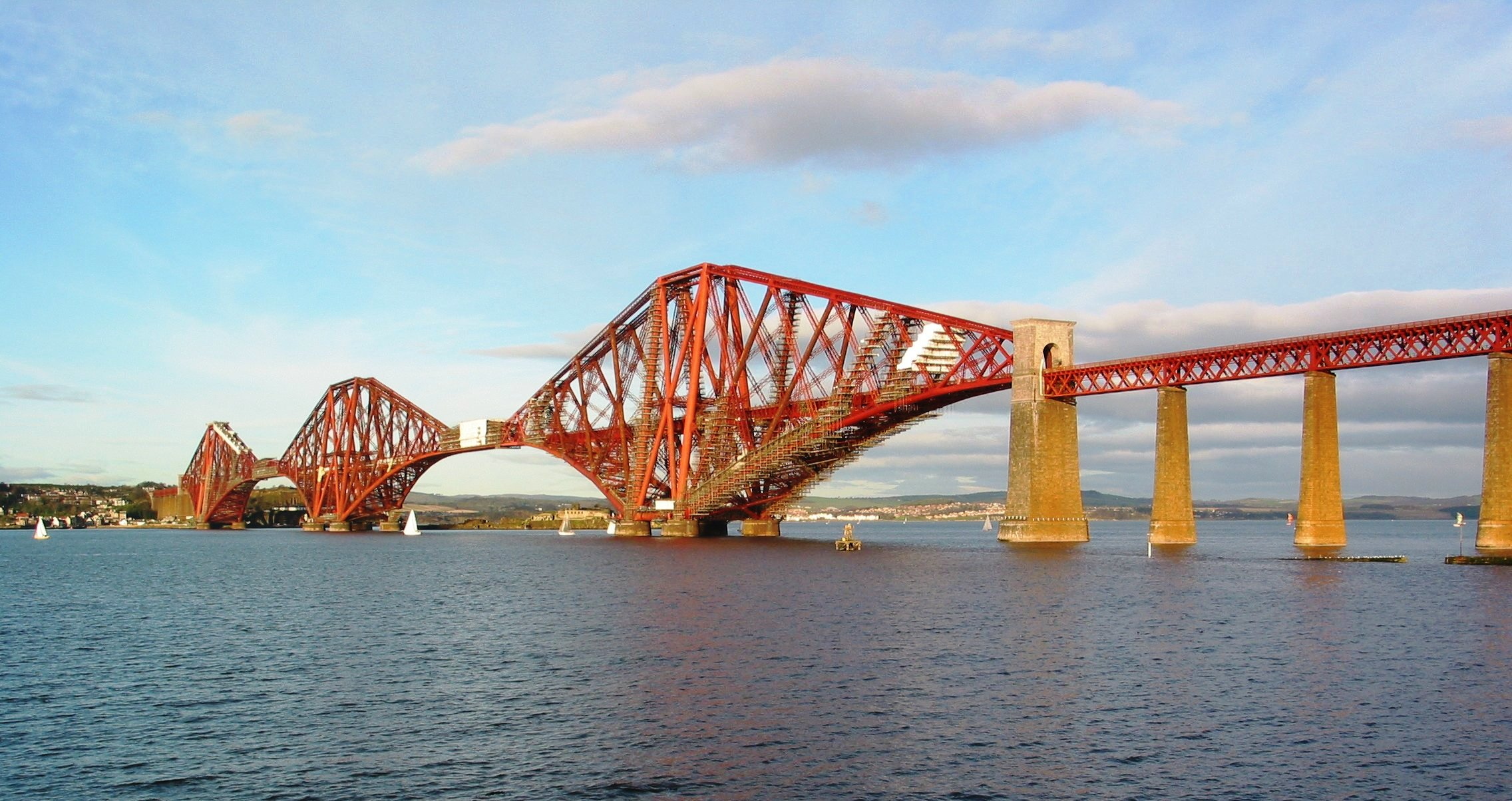
The Forth Bridge in 2004

Edinburgh's suburban network is less dense than Glasgow's. Edinburgh's main station is Waverley. The main railway line through the city centre runs in a cutting immediately below Edinburgh Castle. A secondary station is at Haymarket in the west of the city. Railway lines running north from Edinburgh to Fife and the Highlands cross the Firth of Forth via the Forth Bridge. Lines in and around Edinburgh were:

- Edinburgh–Bathgate line (incorporated into the North Clyde Line)
- Edinburgh Crossrail
- Edinburgh–Dunblane line
- North Berwick Line
- Shotts Line
- Edinburgh–Dundee line

The Edinburgh rail network is being expanded with the construction of the Waverley Line to the Borders, and the Edinburgh–Bathgate Line has been extended by the Airdrie–Bathgate rail link. A project to open a rail link to Edinburgh Airport was cancelled in September 2007 by the Scottish Government in favour of construction of a station at nearby Gogar which will connect with the Edinburgh tram network to take passengers to the terminal. A proposal to re-open the Edinburgh suburban railway line has been made by campaigning groups.

=== Rural lines ===
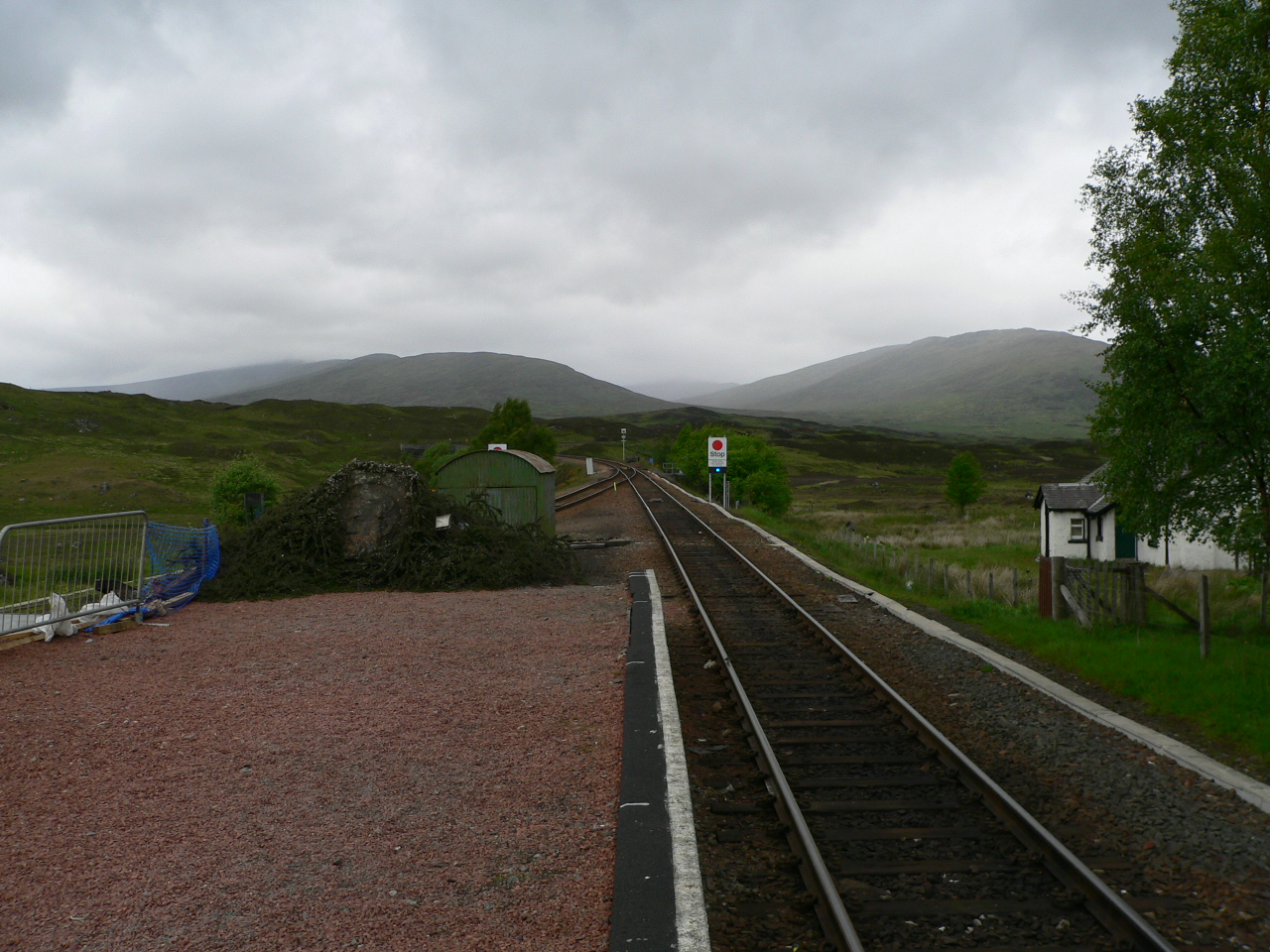
The West Highland Line at Rannoch

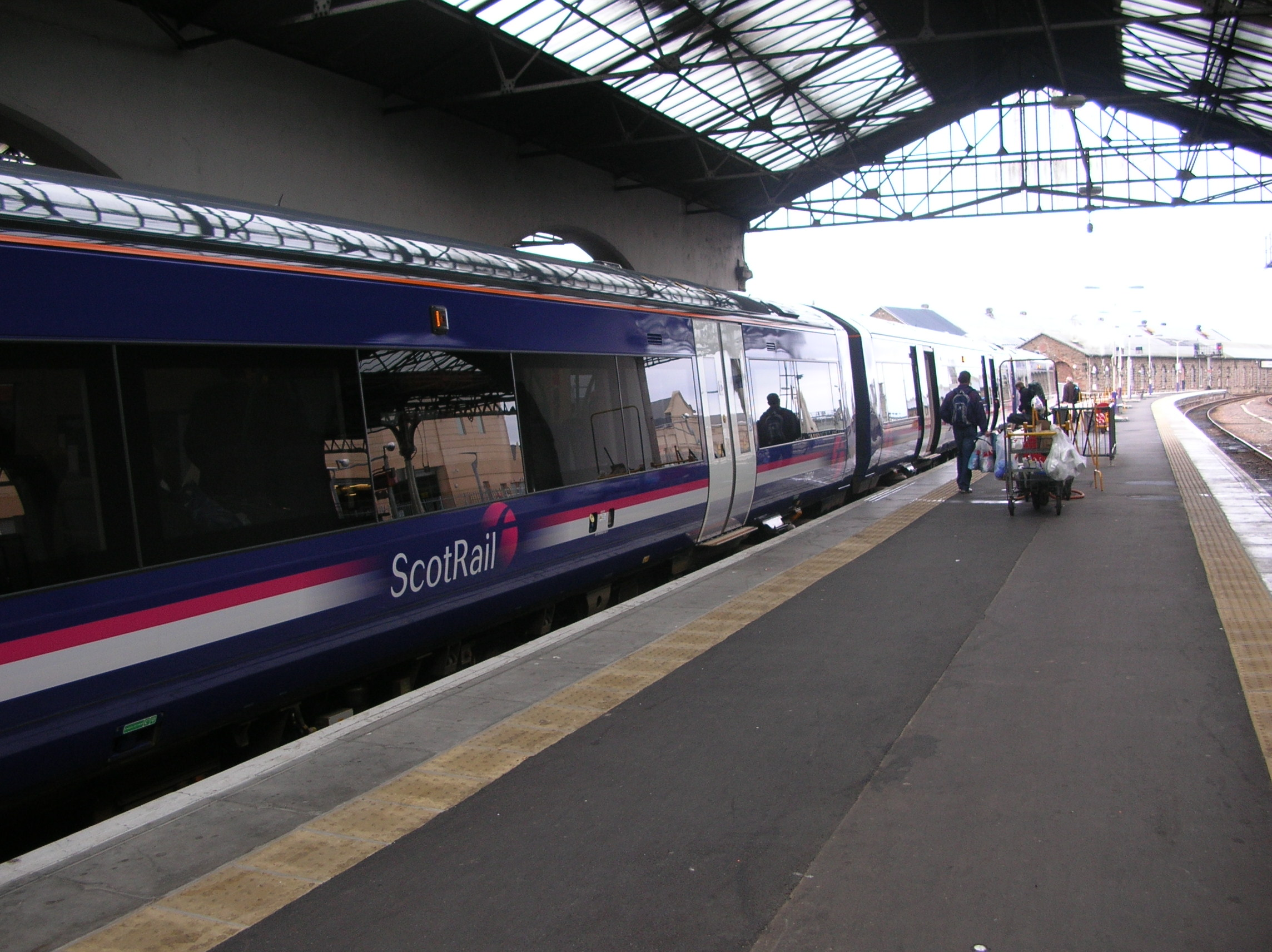
Class 170 Turbostar in First ScotRail livery at Inverness

Rural lines include the scenic West Highland Line, Kyle of Lochalsh line and Far North Line. These lines carried more passengers, mostly tourists, during the summer months, but provided a valuable link and social service during the winter months.

Many rural lines are single track. Trains terminating at the coastal towns of Oban and Mallaig connected with the Caledonian MacBrayne ferry services to Skye, Colonsay, Lismore, Islay and the Outer Hebrides and Inner Hebrides.

The rural lines were:

- Aberdeen–Inverness line
- Far North Line
- Kyle of Lochalsh line
- West Highland Line

=== InterCity & Sleeper services ===
First ScotRail operated some services that ventured south of the border: principally the Caledonian Sleeper to London Euston along the West Coast Main Line, and a three times daily cross-country service between Newcastle upon Tyne and Glasgow Central via Carlisle and Kilmarnock.

== Performance ==
Performance figures for National Express's last quarter as franchise holder, July to September 2004, were:

| Period | % trains arriving within 5 mins of scheduled time | Change |
|---|---|---|
| Jul - Sep 2004 | 82.8% | Down 4.2% on the same quarter the previous year |
| Jul - Sep 2004 | 84.2% | Down 1.0% on the previous year as a whole |

Performance figures for FirstGroup's first quarter as franchise holder, October to December 2004, were:

| Period | % trains arriving within 5 mins of scheduled time | Change |
|---|---|---|
| Oct - Dec 2004 | 79.8% | Down 1.9% on the same quarter the previous year |
| Oct - Dec 2004 | 83.7% | Down 0.5% on the previous year as a whole |

FirstGroup started operating the franchise on 17 October 2004.

The performance figures released by the Office for Rail Regulation (ORR) are as follows:

| Period | % trains arriving within 5 mins of scheduled time (over three months) | Change over same quarter the previous year | % trains arriving within 5 mins of scheduled time Moving Annual Average (MAA) | Change over previous year as a whole |
|---|---|---|---|---|
| Apr - Jun 2007 | 91.4% | Up 0.8% | 89.0% | Up 0.2% |
| Jul - Sep 2007 | 93.0% | Up 2.2% | 89.6% | Up 0.7% |
| Oct - Dec 2007 | 87.3% | Up 2.8% | 90.1% | Up 0.6% |
| Jan - Mar 2008 | 90.5% | Up 2.0% | 90.6% | Up 0.6% |
| Apr - Jun 2008 | 93.6% | Up 2.4% | 91.1% | Up 0.6% |
| Jul - Sep 2008 | 92.8% | Down 0.2% | 91.0% | Up 0.4% |
| Oct - Dec 2008 | 86.5% | Down 0.9% | 90.9% | Up 0.3% |
| Jan - Mar 2009 | 89.6% | Down 1.0%> | 90.6% | Down 0.3% |
| Apr - Jun 2009 | 93.0% | Down 0.6% | 90.5% | Down 0.1% |
| Jul - Sep 2009 | 93.5% | Up 0.9% | 90.7% | Up 0.2% |
| Oct - Dec 2009 | 86.7% | Up 0.2% | 90.7% | Unchanged |
| Jan - Mar 2010 | 89.5% | Down 0.1% | 90.7% | Unchanged |
| Jul - Sep 2010 | 94.5% | Up 1.1% | 91.4% | Up 0.8% |
| Oct - Dec 2010 | 78.4% | Down 9.6% | 92.9% | Up 2.4% |
| Jan - Mar 2011 | 89.1% | Down 0.0% | 90.1% | Down 0.0% |

Note:

- The percentage change figures are not the actual increases in % but the percentage increase in the % value.
- These values are very similar to the sector performance level.

== Rolling stock ==
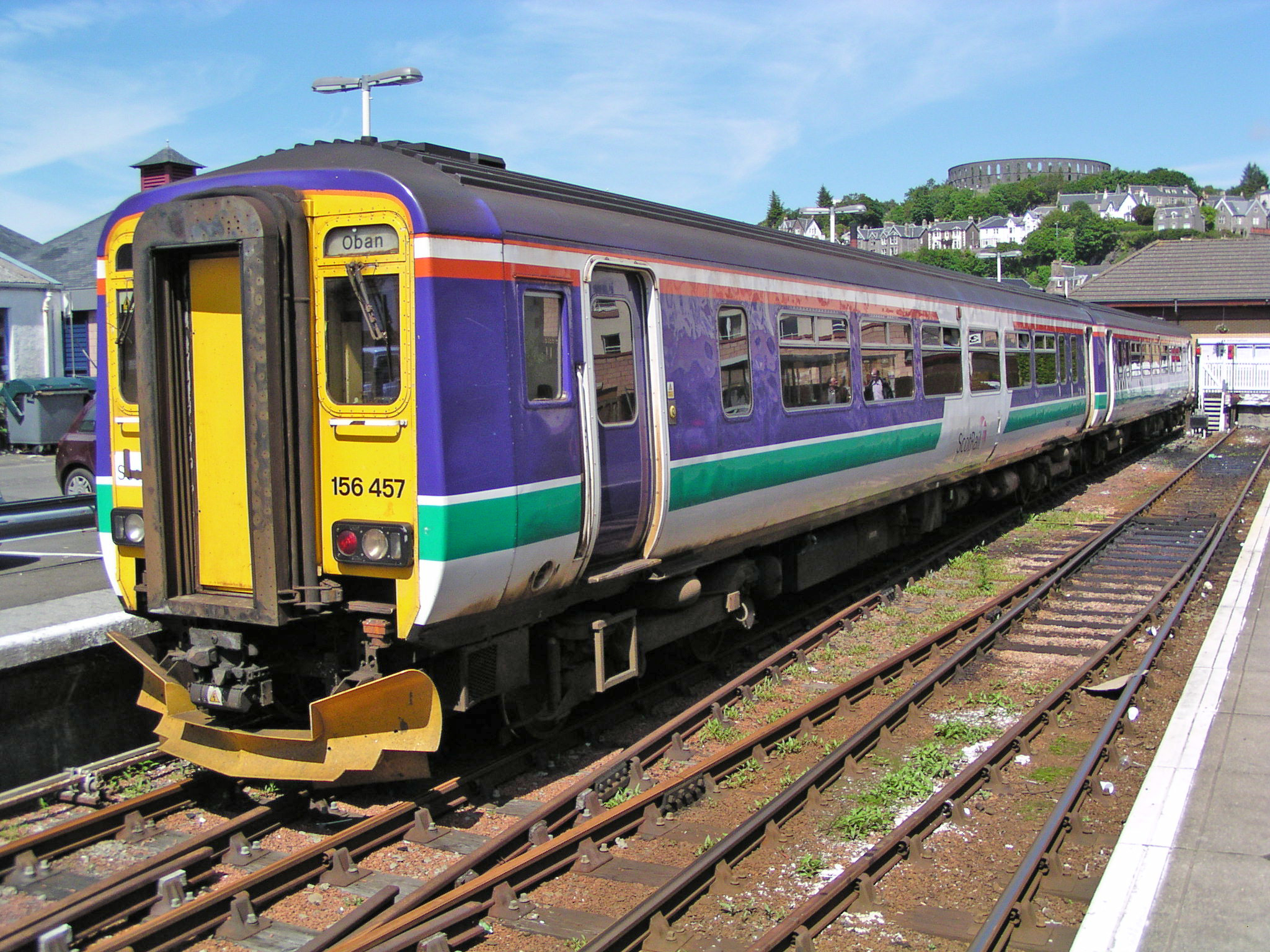
Class 156 in the old National Express ScotRail livery at Oban station in June 2005

First ScotRail inherited a fleet of Class 150, Class 156, Class 158, Class 170, Class 314, Class 318, Class 320 and Class 334s from National Express, as well as Mark 2 carriages and Mark 3 sleepers for use on the Caledonian Sleeper.

First ScotRail contracted EWS to haul the Caledonian Sleeper services. Class 90s were used south of Edinburgh and Glasgow Central with Class 67s used on the portions to Fort William, Aberdeen and Inverness. A dedicated pool was also created due to the need to fit cast steel brakes. Three Class 90s were repainted in First ScotRail livery with EWS logos.

For a short time in 2005, the Edinburgh - North Berwick Line services were operated by English Welsh & Scottish Class 90s with former Virgin Trains Mark 3 carriages and a Driving Van Trailer. In late 2005, five Class 322s were transferred from One to replace these. Following an refurbishment performed by Hunslet-Barclay of Kilmarnock between 2006 and 2007, all Class 322s had their capacity increased from 252 passengers to 293.

During January 2007, public calls were made for the refurbishments of First ScotRail's Class 158 diesel multiple units, particularly in regards to the toilet facilities. One year later, work commenced on the refurbishment of 25 Class 158s, which involved repainting, new seating, extra luggage space, the addition of new customer information systems, and the fitting of the requested toilet retention tanks.

In September 2008, Transport Scotland announced that all First ScotRail trains, including those previously operated on behalf of the Strathclyde Partnership for Transport, would be repainted in a new blue livery with white saltire markings on the carriage ends. This rebranding placed less emphasis on the First and was marketed as "ScotRail: Scotland's Railway". The first unit to receive the new livery was 170434, unveiled at Glasgow Queen Street on 22 September 2008.

During December 2008, ScotRail started operated a set of DB Schenker Mark 2 carriages on a peak-hour Fife Circle Line service hauled by a Class 67. A second set was also operated for a while.

In July 2008, Transport Scotland funded the acquisition of 22 three-carriage and 16 four-carriage Class 380 Desiros with the first entering service in December 2010. These trains operated Ayrshire and Inverclyde services, adding extra capacity and allowed the cascade of existing stock to the new Glasgow to Edinburgh services via the reopened Airdrie to Bathgate line.

=== Fleet at end of franchise ===
| Class | Image | Type | Top speed | | Number | Routes operated | Built |
| Class | Image | Type | mph | km/h | Number | Routes operated | Built |
|---|---|---|---|---|---|---|---|
| Class 67 | | Diesel locomotive | 125 | 200 | Hired from DB Schenker | Fife Circle Line; Caledonian Sleeper | 1999–2000 |
| Class 90 | | Electric locomotive | 110 | 177 | Hired from DB Schenker (4 required per service night) | Caledonian Sleeper | 1987–1990 |
| Class 156 Super Sprinter | | DMU | 75 | 120 | 48 | West Highland Line; Glasgow South Western Line; Shotts Line; Croy Line; Edinburgh Crossrail; Maryhill Line; Cumbernauld Line | 1987–1989 |
| Class 158 Express Sprinter | | DMU | 90 | 145 | 48 | Glasgow to Edinburgh via Falkirk Line; Edinburgh to Aberdeen Line; Highland Main Line; Croy Line; Aberdeen to Inverness Line; Kyle of Lochalsh Line; Far North Line; Edinburgh Crossrail; Edinburgh to Dunblane Line; Fife Circle Line; Shotts Line; Maryhill Line; Cumbernauld Line | 1989–1992 |
| Class 170 Turbostar | | DMU | 100 | 161 | 59 | Glasgow to Edinburgh via Falkirk Line; Edinburgh to Aberdeen Line; Highland Main Line; Fife Circle Line; Edinburgh Crossrail; Edinburgh to Dunblane Line; Croy Line; Maryhill Line; Cumbernauld Line; Tay Coast Line | 1998–2005 |
| Class 314 | | EMU | 75 | 121 | 16 | Cathcart Circle Lines; Inverclyde Line; Paisley Canal Line | 1979 |
| Class 318 | | EMU | 90 | 145 | 21 | Argyle Line; North Clyde Line; Whifflet Line | 1986–1987 |
| Class 320 | | EMU | 90 | 145 | 22 | Argyle Line; North Clyde Line; Whifflet Line | 1990 |
| Class 334 Coradia Juniper | | EMU | 90 | 145 | 40 | North Clyde Line; Argyle Line | 1999–2002 |
| Class 380 Desiro | | EMU | 100 | 160 | 22 (3 carriage); 16 (4 carriage) | Ayrshire Coast Line; Inverclyde Line; Glasgow to Edinburgh via Carstairs Line; North Berwick Line; Paisley Canal Line | 2009–2011 |
| Mark 2 carriage | | Sleeper Seated | 100 | 160 | 22 | Caledonian Sleeper | 1969–1974 |
| Mark 3 carriage | | Sleeper Berth | 125 | 200 | 53 | Caledonian Sleeper | 1975–1988 |

=== Past fleet ===
Former train types operated by First ScotRail include:

| Class | Image | Type | Top speed | | Number | Carriages | Built | Left fleet |
| Class | Image | Type | mph | km/h | Number | Carriages | Built | Left fleet |
|---|---|---|---|---|---|---|---|---|
| Class 150 Sprinter | | DMU | 75 | 121 | 18 | 2 | 1986–1987 | 2005 |
| Class 322 | | EMU | 100 | 161 | 5 | 4 | 1990 | 2011 |

== Stations ==
The majority of Scotland's 340 passenger stations were operated by First ScotRail under Network Rail ownership. Edinburgh Waverley and Glasgow Central stations were operated by Network Rail itself; Glasgow Prestwick Airport station was owned and operated by the airport; and Dunbar was operated by the InterCity East Coast franchise holder (originally GNER, then National Express East Coast, then East Coast, and finally Virgin Trains East Coast). ScotRail operated Lockerbie station although none of its services called there.

== Depots ==
First ScotRail's fleet was maintained at Edinburgh Haymarket, Glasgow Shields Road, Corkerhill and Inverness depots. During early 2005, the rebuilt Glasgow Eastfield was reopened.

== See also ==
- ScotRail, the train operating company operating the ScotRail franchise since 1 April 2022
- ScotRail (brand)
- Transport in Scotland
- Transport in Edinburgh
- Transport in Glasgow
- Category:Transport in Scotland by council area
- Caledonian Sleeper
- Strathclyde Partnership for Transport
- Transport Initiatives Edinburgh
- Glasgow Subway
- Transport Scotland (government agency)
- List of railway lines in Great Britain
- Abellio ScotRail

| Preceded by ScotRail (National Express) | Operator of ScotRail franchise 2004–2015 | Succeeded by Abellio ScotRail |
| Preceded by ScotRail (National Express) | Operator of ScotRail franchise 2004–2015 | Succeeded by Caledonian Sleeper; Caledonian Sleeper franchise |
