= Glasgow–Edinburgh via Carstairs line =

Railway line connecting Glasgow and Edinburgh

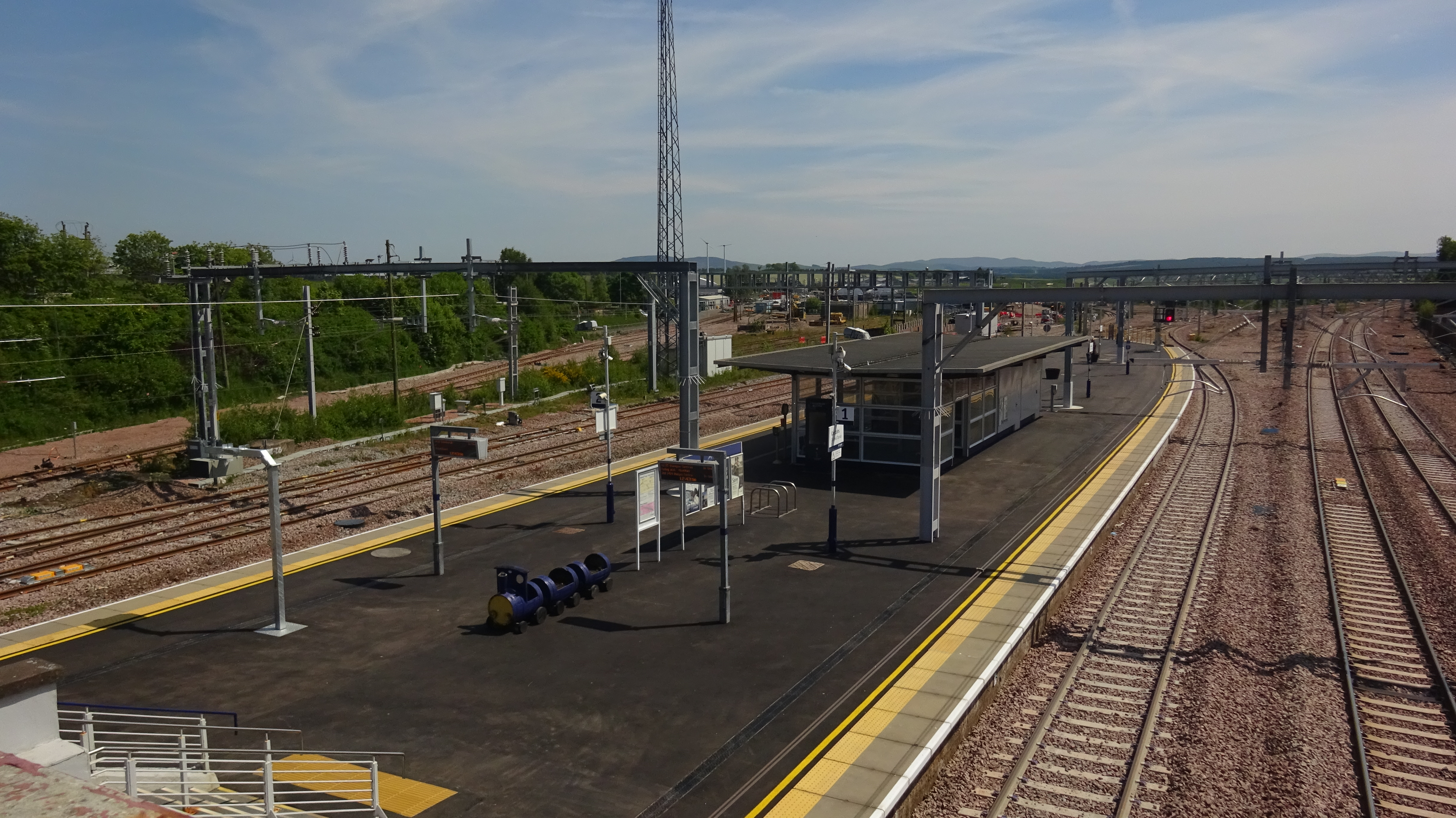
- Carstairs railway station

Overview
- Status: Operational
- Owner: Network Rail
- Locale: Scotland

Service
- Type: Heavy rail
- System: National Rail
- Operator(s): ScotRail; Avanti West Coast; CrossCountry; TransPennine Express DB Cargo; Freightliner; Direct Rail Services
- Rolling stock: Class 220 "Voyager"; Class 221 "SuperVoyager"; Class 385; Class 397 "Civity"; Class 390 "Pendolino"

Technical
- Track gauge: 4 ft 8 1/2 in (1,435 mm)
- Electrification: 25 kV 50 Hz AC
Route map
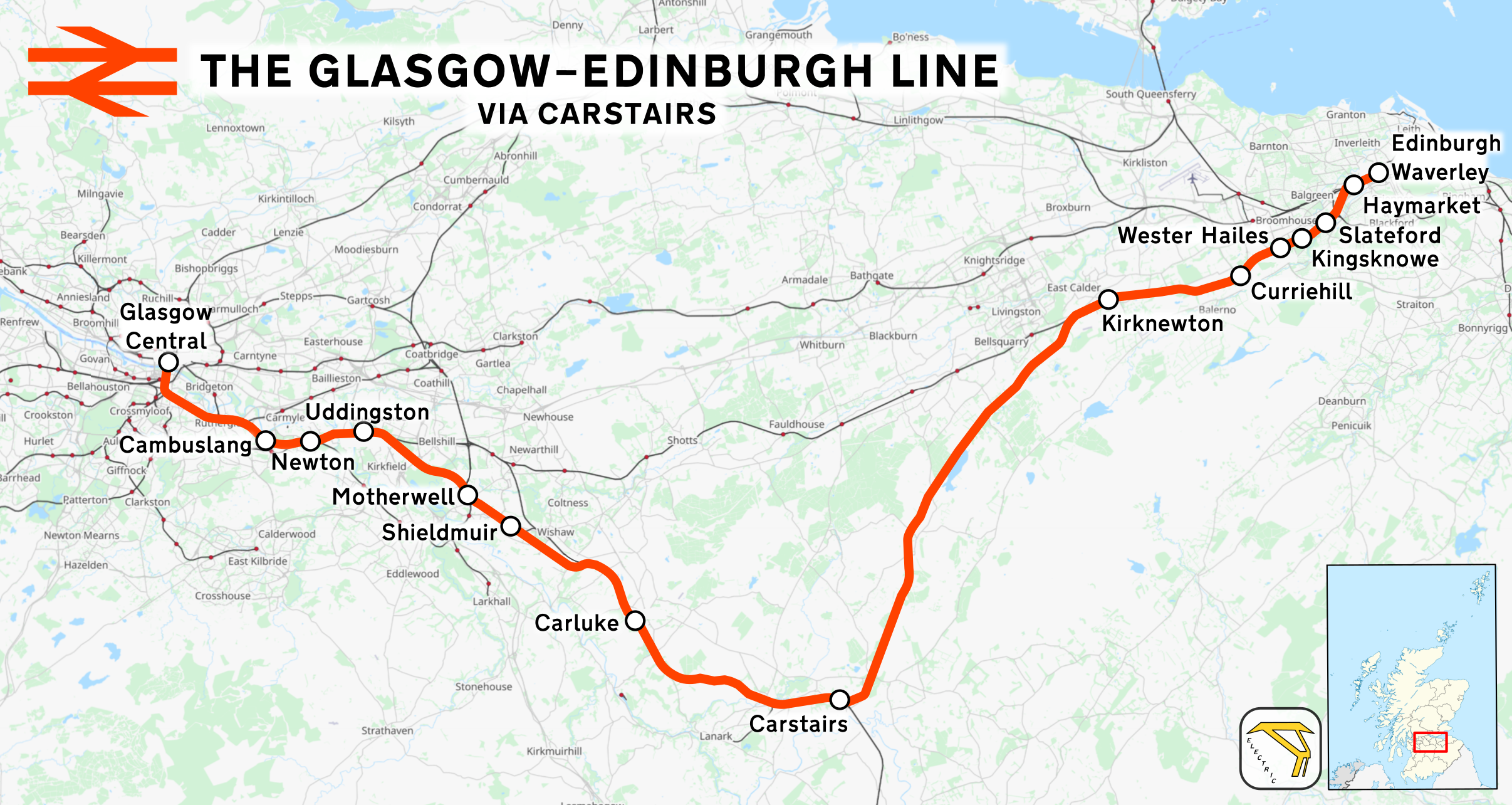
(Click to expand)

The Glasgow–Edinburgh via Carstairs line is a main railway route which connects the Scottish cities of Glasgow and Edinburgh, by means of their respective sections of the West Coast Main Line (WCML).

Along with the Shotts line, the Falkirk line, and the Helensburgh to Edinburgh route via Airdrie and Bathgate, the line is one of 4 direct Glasgow–Edinburgh lines all of which are electrified. It is frequently used by passenger and freight traffic. Passenger services are operated by ScotRail, Avanti West Coast, CrossCountry and TransPennine Express with freight services operated by DB Cargo, Freightliner and Direct Rail Services.

== History ==
This line was opened by the Caledonian Railway as part of a plan to link Glasgow and Edinburgh to the railways in England. The main line from England (now known as the West Coast Main Line) splits at Carstairs, with one branch going to Edinburgh Waverley and the other to Glasgow Central. The Glasgow–Edinburgh via Carstairs line consists of those two branches joined by a short connecting chord at Carstairs. The Edinburgh portion opened for passengers on 15 February 1848, and the Glasgow section opened for passengers on 1 November 1849.

The original Edinburgh terminus was at Lothian Road, until Princes Street opened on 2 May 1870. It closed under the Beeching cuts in 1965, when the remaining services were diverted to Edinburgh Waverley. The Glasgow terminus was initially Buchanan Street, but when Glasgow Central opened on 31 July 1879 this became the terminus, and has remained so ever since.

From 1849 to 1869 the Caledonian Railway provided a service from Edinburgh (Lothian Road) to Glasgow (Buchanan Street), by way of Carstairs, Coatbridge and Stepps, although this was a somewhat circuitous route compared to the rival Edinburgh and Glasgow Railway line via Falkirk High. The E&G line was already well established by this time, having opened from Glasgow Queen Street to Edinburgh Haymarket in February 1842 and been extended to Edinburgh Waverley in August 1846. The Caledonian therefore opened its direct route via Shotts in 1869, and diverted all of its Edinburgh to Glasgow services via that line. Regular services between the two cities via Carstairs did not resume for over 120 years, although the lines remained busy with services from both cities to and from England.

After the 1922 grouping, all the lines became part of the London, Midland and Scottish Railway company, and after nationalisation in 1948 they became part of British Rail.

== Electrification and modernisation ==
Electrified power lines began to appear at Glasgow Central station high-level platforms at the start of 1960s under British Railways. The WCML electrification scheme from Weaver Junction to Glasgow through Carstairs was discussed in 1968 and a report issued, and was completed in 1974 with squadron service starting on 6 May 1974. The East Coast Main Line (ECML) was electrified in stages and reached Edinburgh in 1991. The Edinburgh to Carstairs section of the line was also electrified at this time although it had already been studied in 1978.

Carstairs was considered a bottleneck on the WCML and so remodelling was considered necessary. Improvements undertaken included signalling, track renewal and other work partially completed October 2022 and further work continued in 2023. it also included substantial realignment of tracks and platforms to facilitate line speed increases for which a 12-week closure was needed.

The Carstairs to Glasgow section was electrified by British Rail in 1974 as part of the electrification of the Weaver Junction to Glasgow Central section of the WCML. The Carstairs to Edinburgh section was not electrified at that time. Many long-distance trains from the south were split into separate Edinburgh and Glasgow portions at Carstairs, and diesel locomotives continued to operate the Carstairs to Edinburgh part of the service, typically adding at least 20 minutes to Edinburgh schedules. Division on northbound services was relatively simple, with the electric locomotive continuing forward with the Glasgow portion of the train, while a diesel loco would be attached to the rear part and would haul the Edinburgh train in the opposite direction. However, attachment would involve the section from Edinburgh arriving into Carstairs first behind a diesel locomotive, and pointing in the Glasgow direction, with the Glasgow portion running past under electric power. The Edinburgh portion would then reverse back into the opposite platform to join the back of the Glasgow section and the fully joined up train would then head south. After WCML electrification the Edinburgh portions were typically hauled by a Haymarket locomotive fitted with Electric Train Heating, either a Class 47 or Class 40.

The Carstairs–Edinburgh section was electrified in 1991 as part of the electrification of the East Coast Main Line (ECML). When this was completed, two new services from Edinburgh to Glasgow via Carstairs were reintroduced. Although the line via Carstairs is the longest of the various routes between Edinburgh and Glasgow, its electrification allowed the London King's Cross to Glasgow Intercity services (which had previously run to Glasgow Queen Street via the E&GR line) to be operated by InterCity 225 electric trains and diverted to Glasgow Central station.

From 2011, changes to the franchising arrangements resulted in most of the East Coast London King's Cross to Glasgow Central services being withdrawn. Instead, some CrossCountry services from south-west England to Edinburgh via York were extended from Edinburgh to Glasgow Central in order to maintain a service from Glasgow to north-east England. Although these are operated by diesel trains they continue to operate via Carstairs rather than the more direct Shotts line, which is not maintained for high speed running.

== Route ==
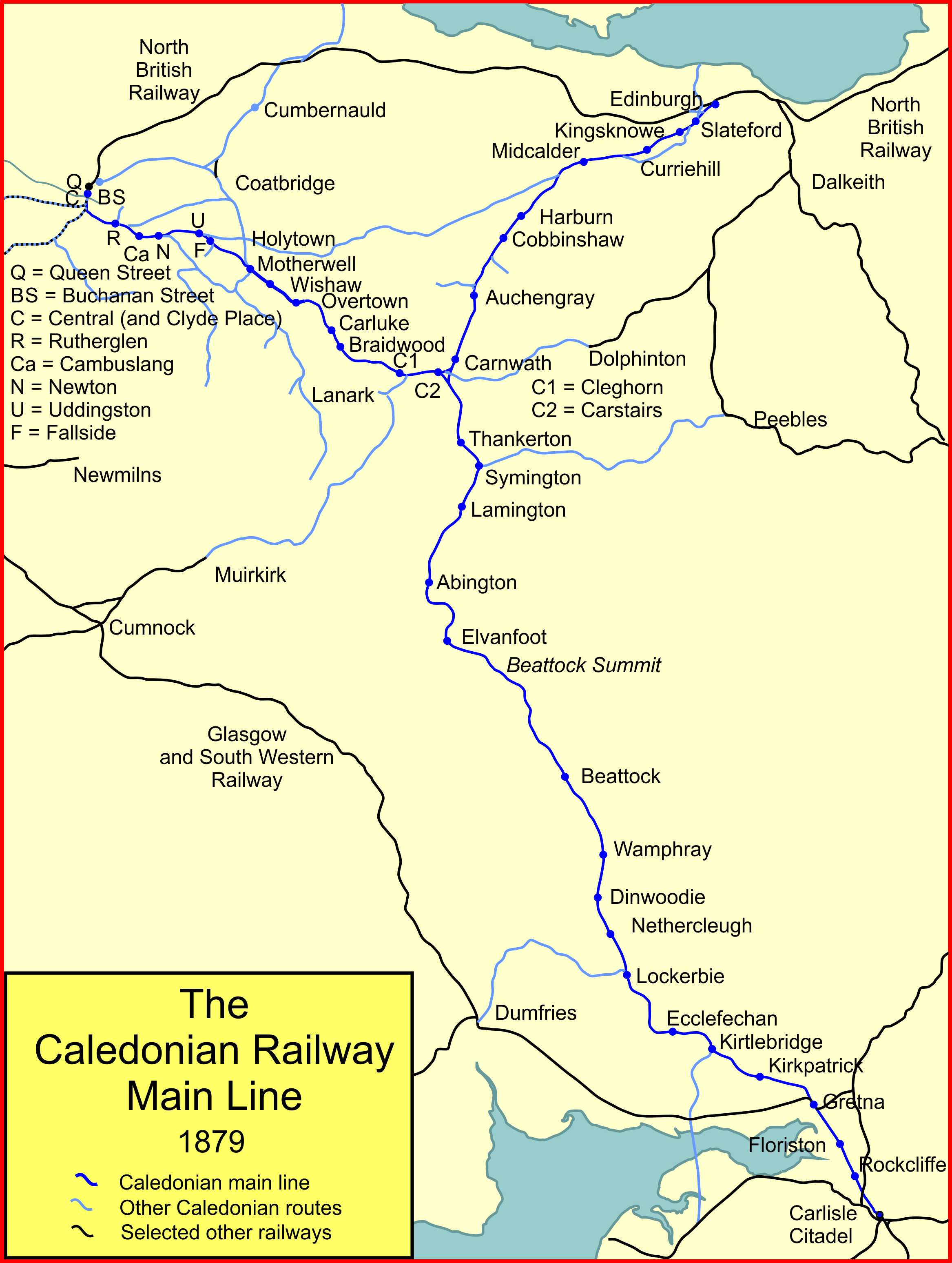
Map of the line in dark blue, it is the top half of the 'Y'.

Starting from Glasgow Central (High Level), the line follows the main spine of the WCML to Motherwell where it continues to Carstairs. South of the station, the line split at Carstairs Junction where it joined another branch from the southern section of the WCML through a tight curve (the Calder Chord) with a permanent speed restriction of 20 mph (30 km/h). The junction and the station were completely remodelled in 2023 to remove these restrictions.

From Carstairs the line proceeds in a north easterly direction up the Edinburgh branch of the WCML towards Edinburgh. At Kirknewton the line joins up with the Shotts line and continues towards Haymarket station in western Edinburgh.

At Haymarket, the line joins the Glasgow to Edinburgh via Falkirk Line from Glasgow Queen Street with four tracks running through the two main tunnels into Edinburgh Waverley station. London North Eastern Railway services and some Avanti West Coast services use the two straight through platforms at either side of the historic station, while ScotRail services not working to North Berwick terminate at the several bay platforms on the west side of the station.

== Services ==
The main services to use the route are East Coast, Cross Country and Scottish Regional Services. It is generally not regarded as a main commuter route between Glasgow and Edinburgh owing to its circuitous route which involves travelling 30 miles (50 km) south towards Carstairs and returning north again, and the lack of available train paths since long-distance freight and express services towards England are given priority on it.

=== Summer 2007 ===
The most frequent user of the line was GNER which runs a service to and from Glasgow Central every two hours until 2000. However, due to engineering work at Edinburgh Waverley from late July until November, only one return service per day used the line. Buses replaced trains from Motherwell station, and passengers were advised to travel from Glasgow Queen Street station.

Virgin Trains West Coast operated services from both Edinburgh and Glasgow Central to London Euston via the WCML. Virgin CrossCountry operated services from Edinburgh via the ECML and Glasgow via the WCML to destinations as far as Brighton, Bournemouth and Penzance.

First ScotRail operates services to/from North Berwick on the line. Only a few services continued from Edinburgh to Glasgow Central from the coastal town. A similar service operated from Glasgow Central to North Berwick.

=== Winter 2007/08 ===
The users of the line were:

- National Express East Coast (NXEC) which runs a service to and from Glasgow Central on an approximately two-hour frequency.
- Virgin Trains use the line to run services to England (to London and Birmingham).
- CrossCountry trains operate services from Glasgow to Edinburgh for destinations to the southcoast.
- First ScotRail operate services to/from North Berwick on the line. Only a few services continue from Edinburgh to Glasgow Central from the coastal town. A similar service operates from Glasgow Central to North Berwick.
- First TransPennine Express took over the Manchester to Glasgow Central and Edinburgh services from December 2008 using Class 185.

=== 2018 ===
As of May 2018: Abellio ScotRail run a service roughly every two hours between Glasgow and Edinburgh calling at Motherwell, Wishaw, Carluke, Carstairs, Haymarket and Edinburgh Waverley though 2 trains call at Kirknewton, Curriehill, Wester Hales, Kingsknowe and Slateford. All other services pass through these stations without calling but served by Shotts Line services regularly. Most of these services are extended to/from Ayr with a few also continuing beyond Edinburgh to North Berwick, These services are operated by Class 380s though Class 156s can also be seen. These services do not operate on Sundays.

CrossCountry run a two hourly service to/from Glasgow Central with these services being operated by Class 220s, Class 221s and InterCity 125s.

TransPennine Express run hourly from Manchester Airport to either Glasgow Central (1tp2h) or Edinburgh (1tp2h), alternating with Avanti West Coast services.

=== May 2025 ===
As of May 2025 Scotrail run a service roughly every two hours from Glasgow and Edinburgh with Peak extras that run to/from Carstairs. Cross Country runs 2 trains a day in each direction, with the Glasgow to Edinburgh Service running in the morning and returning in the other direction in the evening. These services run to/from Plymouth.

Avanti West Coast operate a 2 hourly service along the line from Carstairs to Edinburgh, although services only stop at Haymarket and Edinburgh. These services alternate with TransPennine Express services to provide an hourly service from the West Coast Mainline.

LNER withdrew all services over the route in December 2024.

== Rolling stock ==
The route is electrified throughout using 25 kV overhead lines, and three of the passenger companies that use the route employ electric traction. Class 220 (non-tilting) and Class 221 (tilting) 'Voyager' diesel units are used on services to the Midlands and western and southern England.

- ScotRail use Class 385s on the line, on Edinburgh- Glasgow services.
- Avanti West Coast use Class 390 Pendolino EMUs on its Edinburgh / Glasgow to London Euston services.
- CrossCountry use Class 220 Voyager, Class 221 Super Voyager DEMUs on its services that continue from Edinburgh Waverley to Glasgow Central.

== 'Thunderbird' locomotive ==
In April 2002, Virgin Trains West Coast signed a deal with Porterbrook for the rebuilding of 12 Class 47s into Class 57/3s, to create a fleet of locomotives for rescue duties, as well as haul electric trains along routes that lacked overhead wires to power them directly. The first of the locomotives was delivered in June 2002. Carstairs station was home to one of Virgin's special 'Thunderbird' Class 57 locomotives named after the Thunderbirds animation series. 'Thunderbirds' were used to haul broken down services for Virgin and are compatible with both the Pendolino and Voyager fleets.
