= Abellio Rail =

Abellio Rail may refer to:

- Abellio Deutschland
- Abellio ScotRail
- Greater Anglia, formerly Abellio Greater Anglia
