= Abellio ScotRail =

Scottish train operating company owned by Abellio

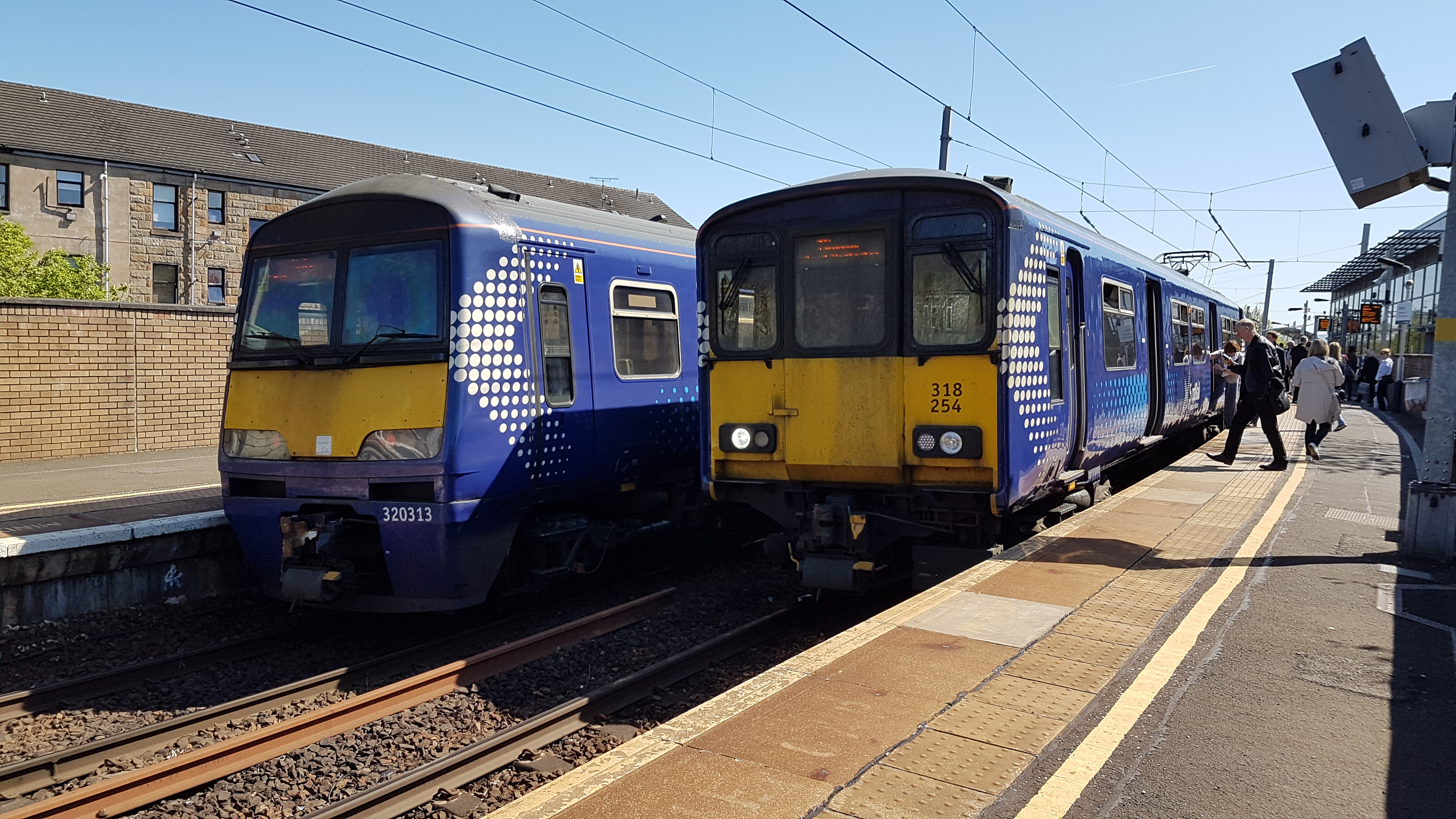
- A Class 320 and a Class 318 at Partick in 2017

Overview
- Franchise: ScotRail
- Main region: Scotland
- Other region: Cumbria
- Stations operated: 354
- Parent company: Abellio
- Reporting mark: SR
- Dates of operation: 1 April 2015–31 March 2022
- Predecessor: First ScotRail
- Successor: ScotRail

Other
- Website: www.scotrail.co.uk
Route map
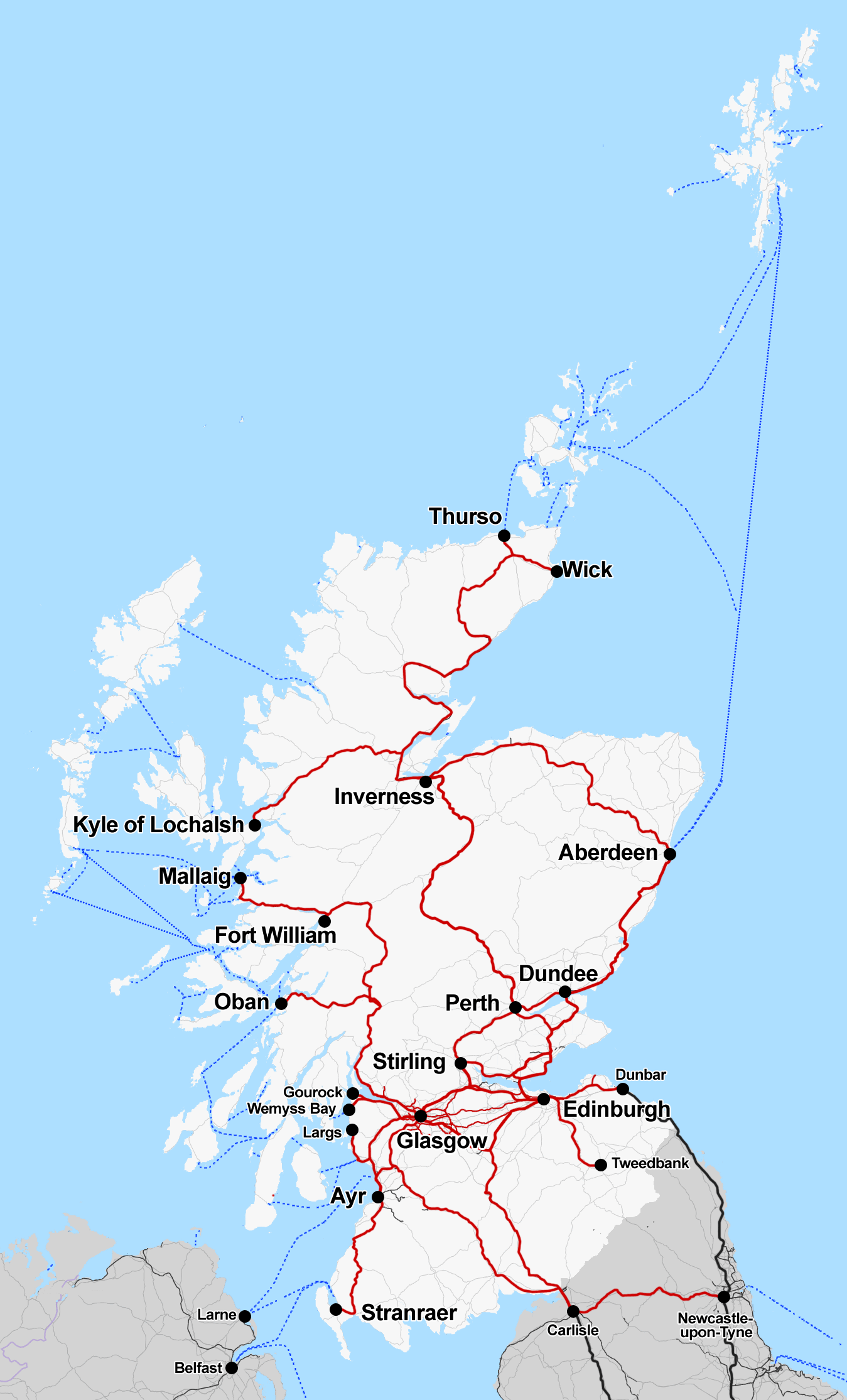

Abellio ScotRail, operating services under the name ScotRail, was a Scottish train operating company. A subsidiary of the Netherlands-based transport conglomerate Abellio, it operated the ScotRail franchise between 1 April 2015 and 31 March 2022.

In October 2014, Abellio was selected by Transport Scotland to take over the franchise from the incumbent operator First ScotRail. On 1 April 2015, Abellio ScotRail commenced operations. On 6 September 2015, it ran the first services on the newly-opened Borders Railway. In conjunction with the wider Edinburgh to Glasgow Improvement Programme, Abellio ScotRail introduced the Class 385 electric trains, which were faster and had more capacity than preceding diesel traction on the route; however, short-term difficulties with the new fleet led to disruption and delays. The operator was also unable to introduce its new Intercity timetable due to the later-than-planned delivery of refurbished Inter7City trains. Following the completion of the Inverness - Aberdeen Improvement Plan, a new hourly service was launched by Abellio ScotRail between these two cities.

During January 2017, the Scottish government and Abellio ScotRail's management publicly disagreed over the funding of a government-directed scheme; Phil Verster, the managing director of Abellio ScotRail and the ScotRail alliance, resigned shortly thereafter. On multiple occasions through the franchise period, the National Union of Rail, Maritime and Transport Workers (RMT) organised industrial action, including strikes, that negatively impacted Abellio ScotRail's operations, to the point where Sunday operations were mostly abandoned over a seven month period in 2021. On 20 January 2017, the managing director of Abellio ScotRail and the ScotRail alliance parted ways with the company. During December 2019, it was announced by the Scottish government that Abellio ScotRail's franchise would end in 2022 due to alleged poor performance. The franchise ended on 31 March 2022 and was replaced by ScotRail, an operator of last resort (OLR) owned by the Scottish Government.

== History ==
In November 2013, Transport Scotland announced that Abellio, Arriva, FirstGroup, MTR Corporation and National Express had been shortlisted to bid for the new ScotRail franchise. In October 2014, the franchise was awarded to Abellio. The franchise was set to operate for a seven year period, although provisions were included for a three-year extension contingent on the operator fulfilling various performance criteria. On 1 April 2015, Abellio began operating the ScotRail franchise.

On 6 September 2015, Abellio ScotRail opened the Borders Railway, a non-electrified largely single-track line roughly following the alignment of the northern part of the long-closed Waverley Route. During its first month of operations, 125,971 passengers travelled on the Borders Railway, far in excess of projections. As a result of overcrowding, Abellio ScotRail quickly started running trains with up to six carriages at peak hours and leased additional parking space near Tweedbank station.

In June 2016, the National Union of Rail, Maritime and Transport Workers (RMT) announced that train conductors would be going on strike several times during the summer months in protest at the running of greater numbers of driver-only operated trains. During June and July 2016, a total of six 24-hour and three 48-hour strikes were conducted by staff working for Abellio ScotRail. An agreement was reached in September 2016 that brought an end to the dispute and therefore service disruption. It was agreed that the new Class 385 trains would have the doors controlled by both the driver and the conductors, the driver opening the doors while the conductors closing them.

During January 2017, the Scottish government and Abellio ScotRail's management clashed over a government-directed scheme to compensate rail passengers for disruptions on the rail network with free tickets; funding for the scheme had not been agreed before the government publicly spoke on the effort leading to tense talks between management and MSPs. That same month, Phil Verster, the managing director of Abellio ScotRail and the ScotRail alliance, abruptly stepped down from his role shortly following the compensation scheme dispute being publicised. Several days later, Alex Hynes was named as the company's new managing director.

In April 2018, Abellio ScotRail announced that it would be implementing all 20 recommendations produced by an independent review of the company's operations, headed by the former TransPennine Express managing director Nick Donovan. These recommendations included reviews of managerial and operational planning arrangements, root cause analysis of infrastructure failures, greater use of remote monitoring, clarifying responsibilities for key systems such as GSM radios, better performance modelling, ring-fencing of planning resources, elimination of unnecessary key performance indicators, and a new focus on system performance improvements at the control room level. A stated intent of these recommendations was to bolster punctuality amongst other performance criteria.

In August 2020, a HST was involved in the Stonehaven derailment after hitting a landslip, killing three and injuring six people. This was the first fatal accident involving a passenger since the Grayrigg derailment in 2007. Network Rail was fined £6.7 million for health and safety standards.

During March 2021, it was announced that the RMT union would ballot conductors for an indefinite overtime ban following Abellio ScotRail's refusal to pay its conductors overtime payments for working on rest days; this action led to no services being run on many routes. One month later, ticket examiners were balloted for the same dispute, the majority of trains operated by ScotRail did not run on Sundays as a result. During October 2021, a deal between the union and the operator was reached, bringing an end to the dispute and restoring Sunday services thereafter.

Abellio ScotRail reportedly failed to meet the performance criteria necessary to gain a three-year extension to its franchise period; according, it was announced during March 2021 that the franchise would be terminated on 31 March 2022. In Abellio's place, the state-owned train operating company ScotRail took over operations.

== Operations ==
=== Services ===
Abellio ScotRail took over all of the services operated by First ScotRail on 1 April 2015, except for the Caledonian Sleeper services, which were transferred to a separate franchise operated by Serco. The franchise agreement required the introduction of 'Great Scottish Scenic Railway' trains on the West Highland, Far North, Kyle, Borders Railway and Glasgow South Western lines. Steam special services were also promoted by Abellio ScotRail.

The planned implementation of Abellio ScotRail's new Intercity timetable had to be postponed due to the delayed delivery of ScotRail's refurbished Inter7City trains, along with the introduction of the Edinburgh - Arbroath and Montrose - Inverurie commuter services. As a result, the stopping pattern of Glasgow/Edinburgh to Aberdeen services was irregular, making calls at many stations at which there is now a frequent stopping service. The improved Glasgow/Edinburgh to Inverness timetable will be introduced along with the Glasgow/Edinburgh to Aberdeen timetable from December 2020.

Following the completion of the Inverness - Aberdeen Improvement Plan, an hourly service was operated by the company between the two cities; furthermore, half hourly services were provided between Elgin and Inverness/Inverurie and Aberdeen that served the two recently opened stations at Dalcross and Kintore. A selection of Inter7City services also commenced operation between Inverness and the Central Belt via Aberdeen, which only called at a couple of stations between Inverness and Aberdeen.

=== Stations ===
Abellio ScotRail operated 352 stations in Scotland. Not included were Prestwick International Airport station, owned and operated by the airport, as well as both Edinburgh Waverley and Glasgow Central, which are managed by Network Rail. Abellio ScotRail operated Lockerbie even though none of its services called there. During June 2015, it also took over management of Dunbar, which had been previously operated by Virgin Trains East Coast.

=== Depots ===
Abellio ScotRail's fleet was maintained at Edinburgh Haymarket, Glasgow Eastfield, Glasgow Shields Road, Corkerhill Glasgow, Yoker, Ayr Townhead, Bathgate and Inverness as well as a newly built EMU stabling depot at Millerhill in Midlothian and a rebuilt depot at Cadder Yard.

== Rolling stock ==
Abellio ScotRail operated a diverse fleet of DMUs, EMUs and loco-hauled stock. From 10 December 2017, Class 380 EMUs were introduced onto services between Glasgow and Edinburgh via Falkirk High (also serving Croy, Polmont, Linlithgow and Haymarket). This was the first step in creating an entirely electric service between the two cities which was expected to start in October 2018 with Class 385 EMUs, which should have entered service in December 2017, but were subsequently delayed due to a windscreen fault.

Early on in the franchise, Abellio ScotRail publicly stated its intention to introduce a brand new fleet of 46 three-car and 24 four-car Class 385 electric trains from December 2017, which would operate services on the lines that were being electrified as part of the Edinburgh to Glasgow Improvement Programme. However, various issues were encountered, including with the rail infrastructure itself but also the trains (mainly related to software and windscreen issues), as well as staff training, that delayed the Class 385s entry to service. To cover for the shortfall in rolling stock, Abellio ScotRail hired 10 Class 365 units from Great Northern. These interim trains entered service in June 2018.

From October 2018, Abellio ScotRail introduced former Great Western Railway HSTs on services between Edinburgh, Glasgow, Aberdeen and Inverness, branded as "Inter7City" in reference to Scotland's seven main cities. The Mark 3 coaches were all outfitted with refurbished interiors, one of the most substantial changes was the replacement of slam doors with powered doors. There were a total of 26 sets: 17 five-car and 9 four-car trains. As with the Class 385s, there were delays in getting the refurbished trains into service. As a result, some HST sets were pressed into service without refurbishment to allow for others to have refurbishment completed. By May 2020, ScotRail was operating an entirely refurbished HST fleet.

This new rolling stock resulted in ten Class 156, eight Class 158 and 21 Class 170 sets returning to their leasing companies when their leases expired in 2018. Transport Scotland negotiated to retain an extra 13 Class 170s to support services through Fife to Aberdeen, the Fife Circle Line (replacing the Class 68/Mark 2 sets), and the Borders railway. Arriva Rail North received five of the 156s, all the 158s and 16 of the Class 170s. Five Class 170s (170416-170420) moved to East Midlands Railway in 2020.

=== Fleet at end of franchise ===
Family	Class	Image	Type	Top speed		Number	Cars	Routes	Built	Notes
Family	Class	Image	Type	mph	km/h	Number	Cars	Routes	Built	Notes
Inter7City
High Speed Train	43		Diesel locomotive	125	200	52	4/5	Aberdeen-Inverness Line; Glasgow/Edinburgh to Aberdeen; Glasgow/Edinburgh to Inverness	1975–1982	Operates under the brand Inter7City.; Fleet consists of 9 four-coach and 17 five-coach trains.; 1 four coach train damaged in the Stonehaven derailment.
High Speed Train	Mark 3		Passenger carriage	125	200	120	4/5	Aberdeen-Inverness Line; Glasgow/Edinburgh to Aberdeen; Glasgow/Edinburgh to Inverness	1975–1982	Operates under the brand Inter7City.; Fleet consists of 9 four-coach and 17 five-coach trains.; 1 four coach train damaged in the Stonehaven derailment.
Diesel multiple units
Sprinter	153 Super Sprinter		DMU	75	120	5	1	West Highland Line (Attached to 156s)	1987–1988	
Sprinter	156 Super Sprinter		DMU	75	120	43	2	Glasgow South Western Line; Maryhill Line; Shotts Line; West Highland Line	1987–1989	
Sprinter	158/0 Express Sprinter		DMU	90	145	40	2	Aberdeen-Inverness Line; Borders Railway; Far North Line; Fife Circle Line; Glasgow/Edinburgh to Inverness; Kyle of Lochalsh line Maryhill Line	1989–1992	
Bombardier Turbostar	170		DMU	100	161	30	3	Aberdeen-Inverness Line; Borders Railway; Edinburgh to Aberdeen Line; Fife Circle Line; Maryhill Line	1999–2001; 2003-05	
Electric multiple units
BR Second Generation (Mark 3)	318		EMU	90	145	21	3	North Clyde Line; Whifflet Line; Cumbernauld Line; Inverclyde Line; Paisley Canal Line; Argyle Line; Cathcart Circle Lines; Glasgow to Lanark via Motherwell	1985–1986	
BR Second Generation (Mark 3)	320/3		EMU	90	145	22	3	North Clyde Line; Whifflet Line; Cumbernauld Line; Inverclyde Line; Paisley Canal Line; Argyle Line; Cathcart Circle Lines; Glasgow to Lanark via Motherwell	1990	
BR Second Generation (Mark 3)	320/4		EMU	100	161	12	3	North Clyde Line; Whifflet Line; Cumbernauld Line; Inverclyde Line; Paisley Canal Line; Argyle Line; Cathcart Circle Lines; Glasgow to Lanark via Motherwell	1989–1990	Converted from Class 321/4.
Alstom Coradia Juniper	334		EMU	90	145	40	3	North Clyde Line; Argyle Line	1999–2002	
Siemens Desiro	380/0		EMU	100	161	22	3	Ayrshire Coast Line; Paisley Canal Line; Inverclyde Line; Cathcart Circle Lines; North Berwick Line; Glasgow to Edinburgh via Shotts	2009–2011	
Siemens Desiro	380/1		EMU	100	161	16	4	Ayrshire Coast Line; Paisley Canal Line; Inverclyde Line; Cathcart Circle Lines; North Berwick Line; Glasgow to Edinburgh via Shotts	2009–2011	
Hitachi AT200	385/0		EMU	100	161	46	3	Glasgow to Edinburgh via Falkirk Line; Glasgow/Edinburgh to North Berwick/Dunbar; Glasgow/Edinburgh to Dunblane and Alloa; Glasgow-Cathcart Circle/Neilston/Newton; Cumbernauld Line; Glasgow to Edinburgh via Motherwell and Carstairs; Glasgow to Lanark via Motherwell; Glasgow to Edinburgh via Shotts; Inverclyde Line; Argyle Line	2015–2019	Operates under the brand eXpress.
Hitachi AT200	385/1		EMU	100	161	24	4	Glasgow to Edinburgh via Falkirk Line; Glasgow/Edinburgh to North Berwick/Dunbar; Glasgow/Edinburgh to Dunblane and Alloa; Glasgow-Cathcart Circle/Neilston/Newton; Cumbernauld Line; Glasgow to Edinburgh via Motherwell and Carstairs; Glasgow to Lanark via Motherwell; Glasgow to Edinburgh via Shotts; Inverclyde Line; Argyle Line	2015–2019	Operates under the brand eXpress.

=== Past fleet ===
This new rolling stock resulted in ten Class 156, eight Class 158 and 21 Class 170 sets returning to their leasing companies when their leases expired in 2018. Transport Scotland negotiated to retain an extra 13 Class 170s to support services through Fife to Aberdeen, the Fife Circle Line, and the Borders railway. Arriva Rail North received five of the Class 156s, all 8 of the Class 158s and 16 of the Class 170s. Five Class 170s (170416-170420) were transferred to East Midlands Railway in 2020.

Former train types operated by ScotRail include:

Family	Class	Image	Type	Top speed		Number	Carriages	Routes	Left fleet	Built
Family	Class	Image	Type	mph	km/h	Number	Carriages	Routes	Left fleet	Built
Inter7City
High Speed Train	43		Diesel locomotive	125	200	1	N/A	Aberdeen-Inverness Line, Glasgow/Edinburgh to Aberdeen; Glasgow/Edinburgh to Inverness	2020	1975–1982
High Speed Train	Mark 3		Passenger carriage	125	200	1	4	Aberdeen-Inverness Line, Glasgow/Edinburgh to Aberdeen; Glasgow/Edinburgh to Inverness	2020	1975–1982
Locomotive hauled stock
Stadler UKLight	68		Diesel locomotive	100	161	2	N/A	Fife Circle Line	2020	2013–2014
	Mark 2		Passenger carriage	100	161	12	6	Fife Circle Line	2020	1973–1975
Diesel multiple units
Sprinter	156 Super Sprinter		DMU	75	121	5	2	Cumbernauld Line; Edinburgh–Dunblane line Fife Circle Line; Glasgow South Western Line; Maryhill Line; Shotts Line; West Highland Line	2018	1987–1989
Sprinter	158/0 Express Sprinter		DMU	90	145	8	2	Aberdeen-Inverness Line; Borders Railway; Cumbernauld Line; Edinburgh–Dunblane line Fife Circle Line; Glasgow/Edinburgh to Inverness; Maryhill Line; Shotts Line	2018	1989–1992
Bombardier Turbostar	170		DMU	100	161	21	3	Aberdeen-Inverness Line; Borders Railway; Cumbernauld Line; Edinburgh to Aberdeen Line; Edinburgh–Dunblane line Fife Circle Line; Glasgow to Edinburgh via Falkirk Line; Maryhill Line	2018, 2020	1999–2001
Electric multiple units
BREL 1972	314		EMU	70	113	16	3	Cathcart Circle Lines; Inverclyde Line; Paisley Canal Line	2018–2019	1979
Networker	365 Networker Express		EMU	100	161	10	4	Glasgow to Edinburgh via Falkirk Line; Edinburgh to Dunblane	2019	1994–1995

== See also ==
- ScotRail, the train operating company operating the ScotRail franchise since 1 April 2022
- ScotRail (brand)

Preceded by First ScotRail	Operator of ScotRail franchise 2015–2022	Succeeded by ScotRail
