= Croy Line =

Railway line in Scotland

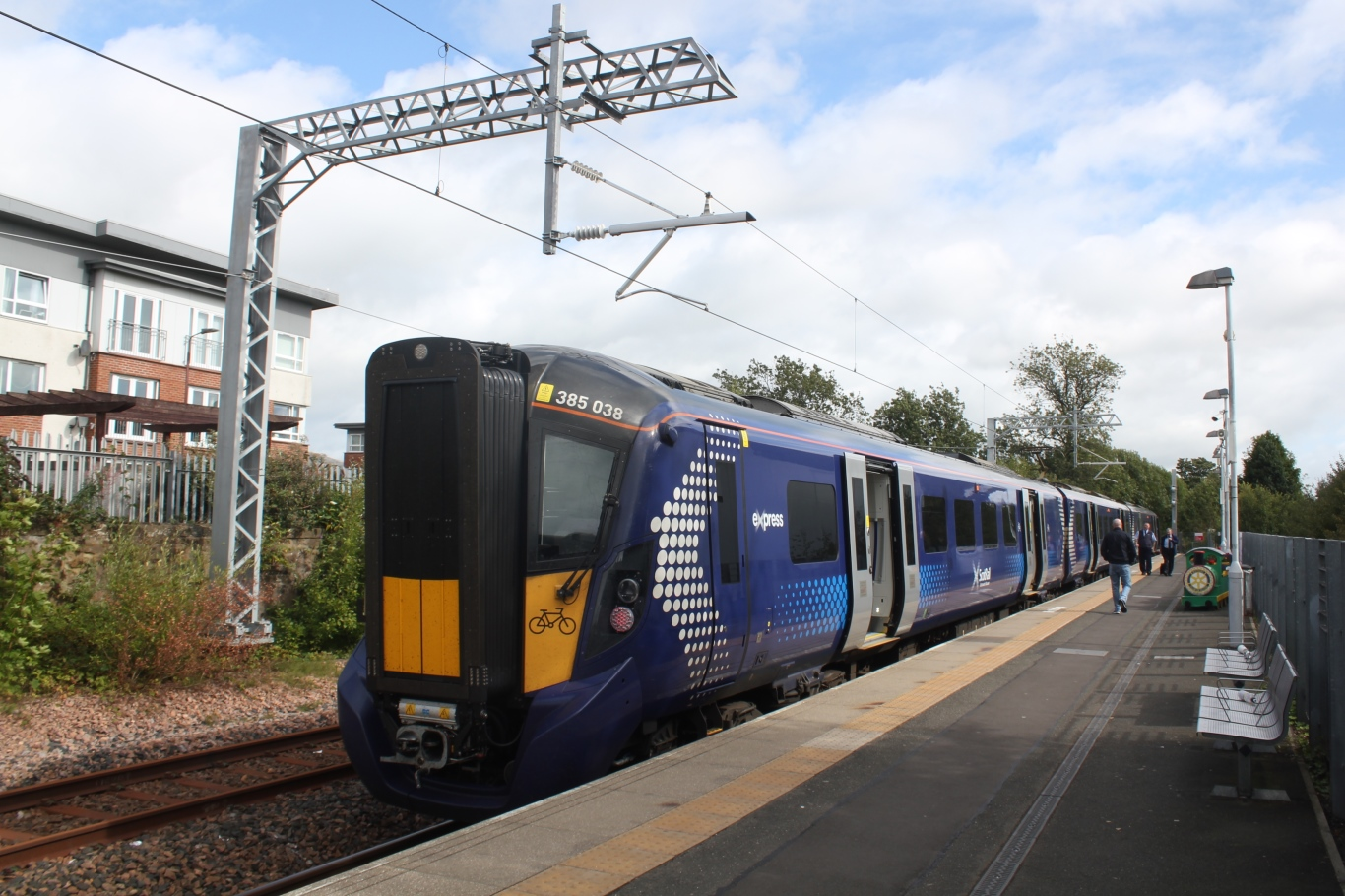
- A Class 385 at Alloa in 2019

Overview
- Status: Operational
- Owner: Network Rail
- Locale: Glasgow; Stirling; East Dunbartonshire; North Lanarkshire; Scotland

Service
- Type: Heavy rail
- System: National Rail
- Operator(s): ScotRail
- Rolling stock: Class 385

Technical
- Track gauge: 1,435 mm (4 ft 8 1/2 in)
Route map
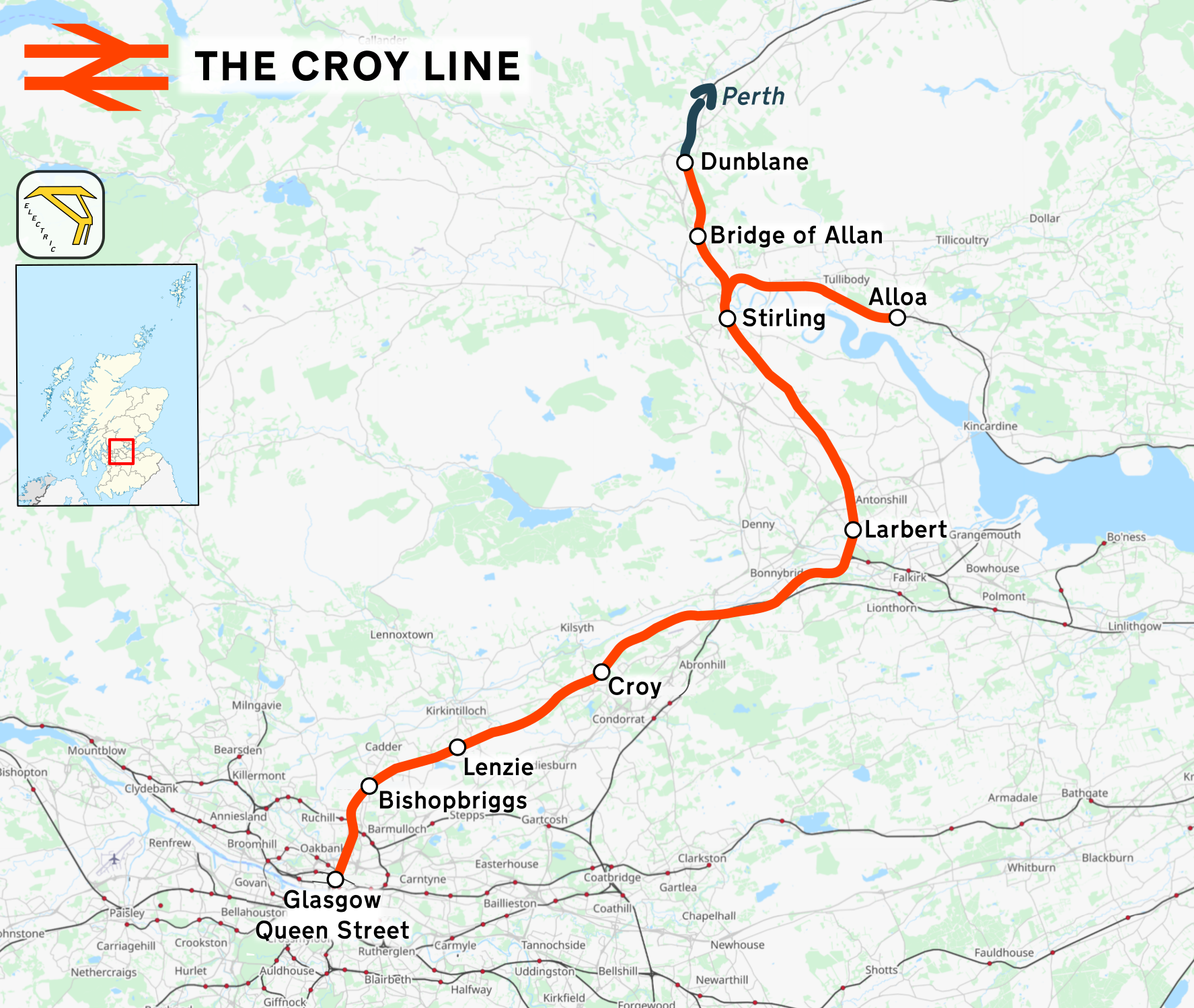
(Click to expand)

The Croy Line is a suburban railway route linking Glasgow Queen Street and Croy in Scotland. It is part of the Strathclyde Partnership for Transport network.

Following completion of the project to reopen the line to Alloa to passenger services on 19 May 2008, Croy Line services continue alternately to Alloa and Dunblane.

This route is now electrified, as of December 2017 up to Alloa and Dunblane. Passenger services are operated by ScotRail.

== Route ==
Most of the route is shared with other services:

- Glasgow to Edinburgh via Falkirk Line between Glasgow Queen Street and Greenhill Junction
- Glasgow to Aberdeen Line between Glasgow Queen Street and Dunblane
- Highland Main Line between Larbert and Dunblane
- Edinburgh to Dunblane Line between Larbert and Dunblane

== Historical route ==
The route comprises the following historical railway lines:

- Edinburgh and Glasgow Railway between Glasgow Queen Street and Greenhill Junction
- Scottish Central Railway between Greenhill Junction and Dunblane
- Stirling and Dunfermline Railway between Stirling and Alloa
