= Glasgow–Edinburgh lines =

Railways in central Scotland

There are four electrified railway lines linking Glasgow with Edinburgh, the two largest cities in Scotland. These are, from north to south:

- Glasgow–Edinburgh via Falkirk line: Glasgow Queen Street to Edinburgh Waverley via Falkirk High
- North Clyde Line: Glasgow Queen Street (low level platforms) to Edinburgh Waverley via Airdrie and Bathgate
- Shotts Line: Glasgow Central to Edinburgh Waverley via Shotts
- Glasgow–Edinburgh via Carstairs line: Glasgow Central to Edinburgh Waverley via Carstairs

Historically, the first line between Glasgow and Edinburgh was the Edinburgh and Glasgow Railway, equivalent to today's Glasgow to Edinburgh via Falkirk Line.

== Former routes ==
Glasgow–Edinburgh via Cumbernauld line: used the Cumbernauld Line from Glasgow Queen Street, and the Edinburgh–Dunblane line.

The use of this line as a secondary route between Glasgow and Edinburgh was introduced as part of the December 2018 timetable and later removed. Services now only go as far as Cumbernauld/Falkirk Grahamston from Glasgow Queen Street as of May 2022 timetable change.

== Edinburgh to Glasgow Improvement Programme ==
See main article, Edinburgh to Glasgow Improvement Programme

At a conference in 2009, major upgrades were proposed for completion by 2016. The first of these was the Airdrie–Bathgate rail link, completed in late 2010. The Glasgow–Edinburgh via Falkirk line was electrified in 2017. The Shotts Line was electrified in 2019. Currently the quickest services between Edinburgh and Glasgow run on the Falkirk line (to and from Glasgow Queen Street).
