= Corkerhill Carriage Servicing Maintenance Depot =

Railway maintenance depot in Corkerhill, Glasgow

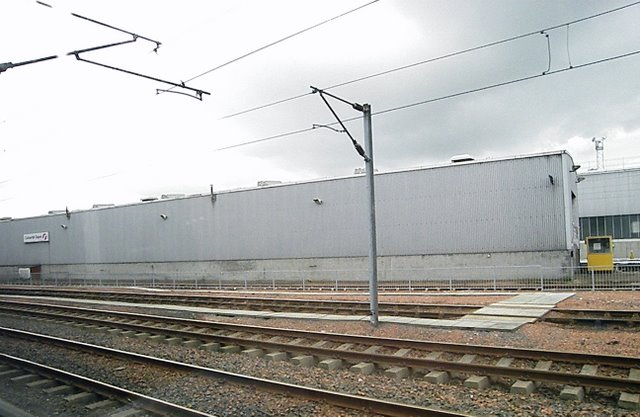
- Corkerhill Depot in 2009
- Interactive map of Corkerhill Carriage Servicing Maintenance Depot

Location
- Location: Corkerhill, Glasgow
- Coordinates: 55.8358°N 4.3252°W
- OS grid: NS544627

Characteristics
- Owner: ScotRail
- Depot code: CK (1973 -)
- Type: DMU, EMU

History
- Opened: 1 December 1896

Corkerhill Carriage Servicing Maintenance Depot is located in Corkerhill, Glasgow, Scotland. The depot is situated on the Paisley Canal Line and is to the east of Corkerhill station.

The depot code is CK.

== Allocation ==
As of 2023, Corkerhill is responsible for the maintenance and cleaning of the 5 ScotRail Class 153s, all 43 ScotRail Class 156s & 18 of the 40 ScotRail Class 158s (units 158723-158736 & 158738-158741) with the other 22 units, 158701-158722 being maintained at Inverness TMD. It is also a cleaning and stabling point for ScotRail Class 318s, Class 320s, Class 380s and Class 385s.

Up until the December 2019 timetable change, TransPennine Express Class 185s and Class 350s could also be seen visiting Corkerhill overnight for cleaning, stabling and light maintenance after working the evening services from Manchester Airport to Glasgow Central.

Corkerhill also cleaned and stabled the now withdrawn ScotRail Class 314s up until December 2019.
