= British Rail Class 385 =

Fleet of 70 electric multiple unit trains operated in Scotland

British Rail Class 385 eXpress
- ScotRail Class 385 at Glasgow Central

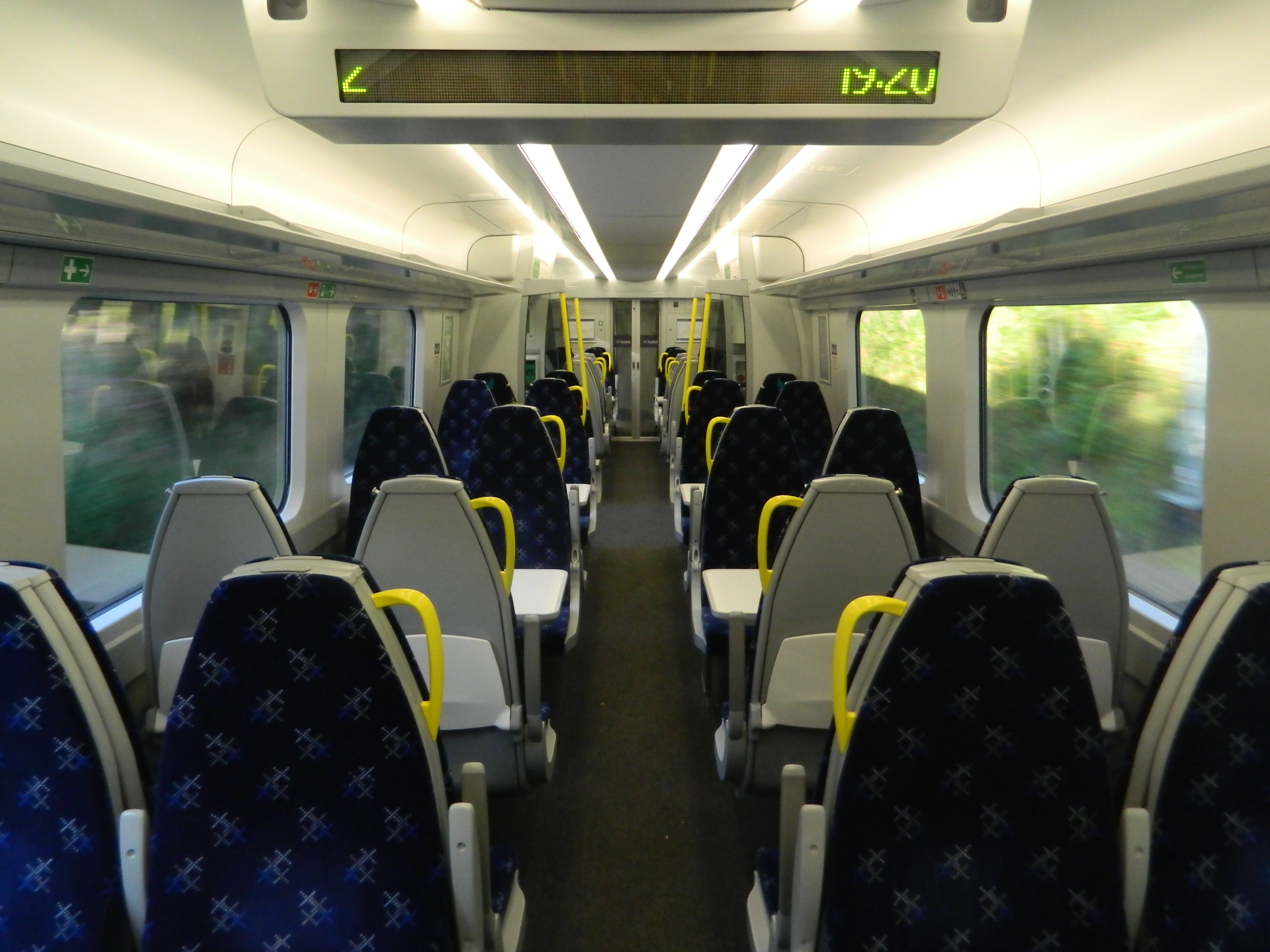
- Standard-class interior
- In service: 24 July 2018 – present
- Manufacturer: Hitachi Rail
- Built at: Kasado Works, Kudamatsu, Japan; Newton Aycliffe Manufacturing Facility, England
- Family name: A-train
- Replaced: Class 156; Class 158; Class 170; Class 314; Class 365
- Constructed: 2015–2019
- Entered service: 2018
- Number built: 46 × 385/0; 24 × 385/1
- Number in service: 70
- Formation: 3 cars per 385/0 unit: DMSL-PTS-DMSL; 4 cars per 385/1 unit: DMCL-PTS-TS-DMSL
- Fleet numbers: 385/0: 385001–385046; 385/1: 385101–385124
- Capacity: 385/0: 206 seats; 385/1: 273 seats (20 first class, 253 standard)
- Operator: ScotRail
- Depot: Craigentinny (Edinburgh) Shields (Glasgow)
- Lines served: Glasgow to Edinburgh via Falkirk; Stirling/Alloa/Dunblane Lines; Shotts Line; Carstairs Line; North Berwick Line; Cathcart Circle Lines; Cumbernauld Line; Inverclyde Line; Glasgow Central to Lanark; Edinburgh Waverley to Dunbar

Specifications
- Car body construction: Double-skin aluminium
- Car length: DM vehs.: 23.639 m (77 ft 6.7 in); Trailers: 23.000 m (75 ft 5.5 in)
- Doors: Double-leaf sliding plug; (2 per side per car)
- Maximum speed: 100 mph (160 km/h)
- Traction system: Hitachi IGBT
- Traction motors: 250 kW (335 hp) each; (6 per 385/0, 8 per 385/1)
- Acceleration: 0.84 m/s^{2} (1.9 mph/s)
- Deceleration: Normal: 1 m/s^{2} (2.2 mph/s); Emergency: 1.2 m/s^{2} (2.7 mph/s)
- Electric system: 25 kV 50 Hz AC overhead
- Current collection: Pantograph
- UIC classification: 385/0: Bo′Bo′+2′2′+Bo′2′; 385/1: Bo′Bo′+2′2′+2′2′+Bo′Bo′
- Braking system: Electro-pneumatic (disc)
- Safety systems: AWS; TPWS
- Coupling system: Dellner
- Multiple working: Within class (max. 12 cars)
- Track gauge: 1,435 mm (4 ft 8 1/2 in) standard gauge

Notes/references
- Sourced from unless otherwise noted.

The British Rail Class 385 eXpress is a type of electric multiple unit built by Hitachi Rail. Initially operated by Abellio ScotRail, and now its state-owned successor, a total of 70 units have been built, divided into 46 three-car and 24 four-car sets. Based on the design of the Hitachi A-train, they are part of the Hitachi AT200 product family and are branded as eXpress by Scotrail.

The trains were built to operate services on newly electrified lines in the Central Belt on a mixture of both suburban and inter-urban routes. Having been ordered by Abellio ScotRail during April 2015, the first trainsets entered service during late July 2018. Their introduction was somewhat delayed due to the need for infrastructure works to be completed, as well as minor technical issues with the trainsets being uncovered. By December 2019, all 70 of the Class 385 trainsets had been delivered. Hitachi has proposed developing a battery electric multiple unit (BEMU) variant of the Class 385, allowing such a trainset to traverse lines that are not electrified at present.

== History ==
In October 2014, immediately after being awarded the ScotRail franchise, Abellio ScotRail announced it had concluded an agreement with the Japanese manufacturer Hitachi Rail to procure 234 new EMU carriages from its A-Train family for use on routes in Scotland that were being electrified. During April 2015, a contract between Hitachi and Abellio ScotRail was signed, ordering 70 new-build trainsets at a cost of £475 million. The trainsets, which are formed into a mix of three- and four-car units, were procured for the purpose of operating along the main Glasgow to Edinburgh via Falkirk Line from December 2017, and across Central Scotland. In this manner, the electrification programme and purchase of new EMUs to operate services, will allow a subsequent cascade of the diesel multiple units currently used elsewhere on the network.

The order for the new EMUs was the first operator-based purchase of a Hitachi product for use in the UK following the IEP procurement, and its subsequent construction of its new Newton Aycliffe Manufacturing Facility at Newton Aycliffe, England. The bulk of the new fleet was constructed at Newton Aycliffe, while the first seven units were instead built at Hitachi's Kasado Works factory in Kudamatsu, Yamaguchi, Japan. The trainsets were supplied to Abellio Scotrail through a leasing arrangement, which was formed at the time of the original order. Accordingly, the ownership of the fleet resides with Caledonian Rail Leasing, a subsidiary company of Sumitomo Mitsui Banking Corporation.

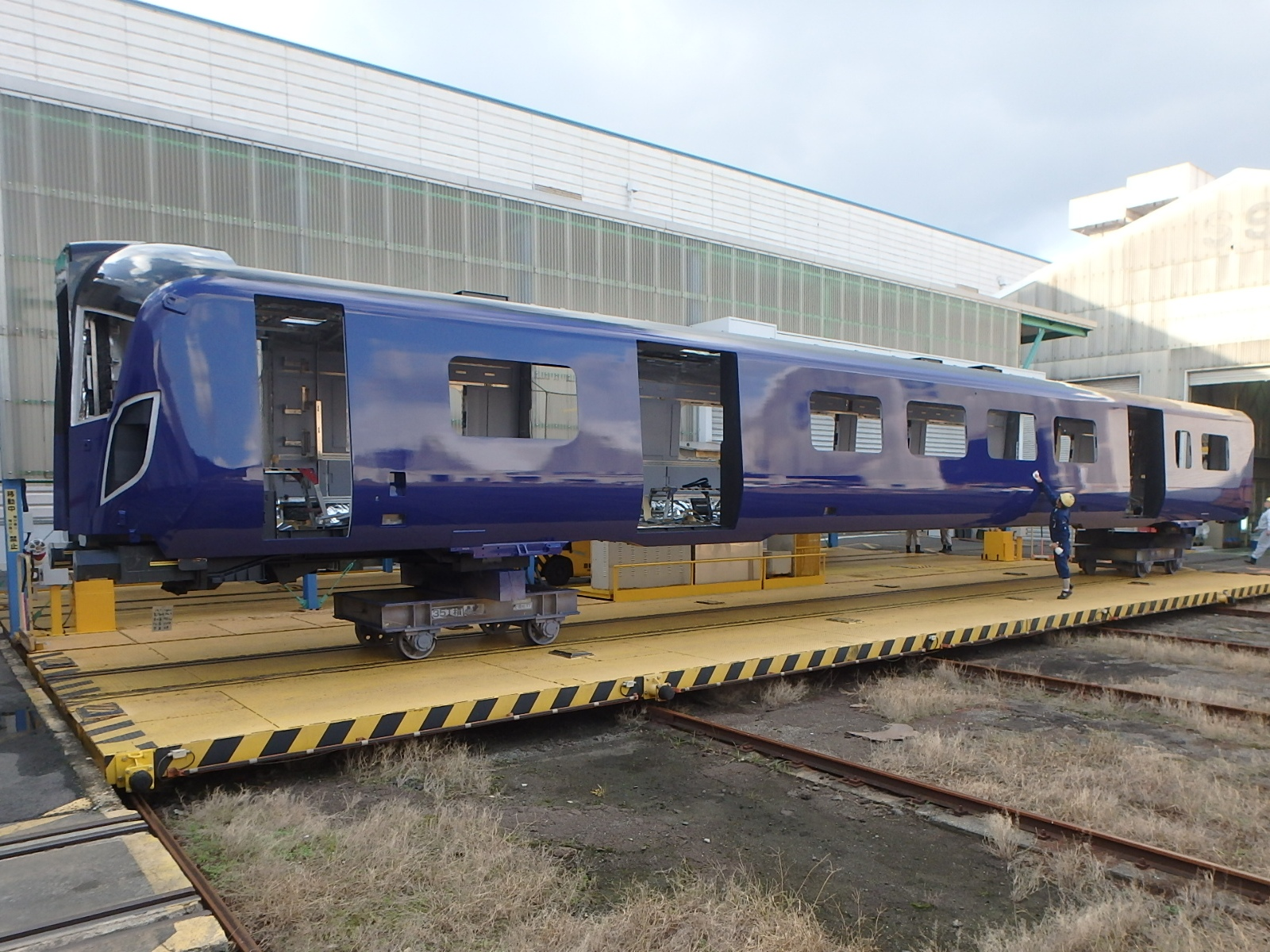
A Class 385 bodyshell being built by Hitachi at Kasado Works

Construction of the first Class 385 units commenced in November 2015, with the first units being delivered in December 2016. The construction process in Newton Aycliffe involved heavily defined processes, including 1,400 standard operating procedures generated from experience at Hitachi's Pistoia plant in Italy and Kasado factory in Japan. The bodyshells, supplied by Kasado, were shipped to Newton Aycliffe and subjected to around seven days of static fitting out, after which they were moved through the production area via an internal traverser; each vehicle required 2,100 man-hours to complete. Roughly 71 percent of all components were sourced within the United Kingdom.

An additional ten three-car units were to be purchased if Transport Scotland exercised an option to extend Abellio ScotRail's contract from seven to ten years; they would have entered service in 2023. The option was not taken up, however.

During early 2019, Hitachi held a series of discussions with the Scottish Government on the development of a variant of the Class 385, a battery electric multiple unit (BEMU) that would be capable of running on unelectrified sections of line along a route. The installation of batteries was reportedly described as being a relatively straightforward alteration to make; an underfloor battery unit, dependent upon size, would be able to power a trainset over distances of 20 to 60 miles (30 to 100 km). The proposal drew upon Hitachi's existing experience with battery trains operated in Japan, and had been motivated by a recommendation from the rail decarbonisation task force which advocated that such measures be implemented.

In May 2021, the Class 385 fleet was inspected for the presence of a potential safety-related structural weakness that has been identified on the similar IETs, also built by Hitachi. While evidence of this issue was found on units of the fleet during these checks, it was not designated as a safety issue at this time.

== Design ==
The Class 385 is a member of Hitachi's A-Train family of aluminium trains and was the first order for the AT-200 commuter train model. The trains are designed for a maximum speed of 100 mph (160 km/h). Sets are formed of two powered driving cars and one or two unpowered intermediate cars. The trains are fitted with a Hitachi-designed IGBT traction pack. Four-carriage trainsets feature four powered bogies per set and the three-carriage trainsets have three powered bogies per set. The passenger doors are plug type and are located at 1/3 and 2/3s along the car body. Seating is in a 2+2 configuration with a mixture of four-seat table bays and airline seating with seat back tables. A toilet is fitted in each driving car. The trains are fully air conditioned.

Due to a requirement to support at-seat catering for all passengers, it was necessary to include a front-end corridor connection; this design alteration required considerable redesign of the driver's cab and forward section in order to obtain the desired functionality while conforming with standards on crashworthiness and driver ergonomics, particularly sighting. The University of Liverpool’s Virtual Engineering Centre consulted on the cab's design, while feedback from drivers and train crews was also sought throughout the process.

== Operations ==
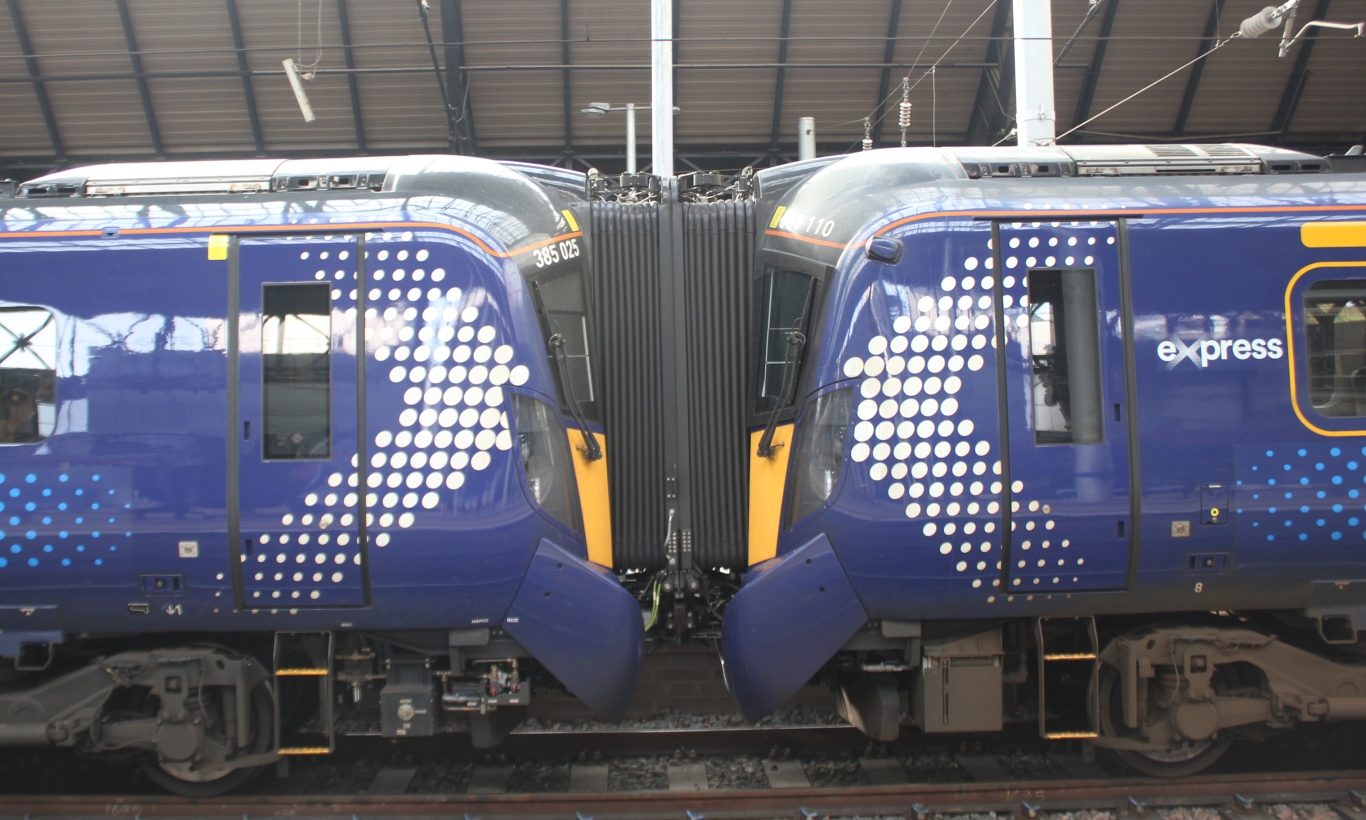
Two coupled Class 385 units, showing the original curved windscreen (left) and modified windscreen with flat glass (right)

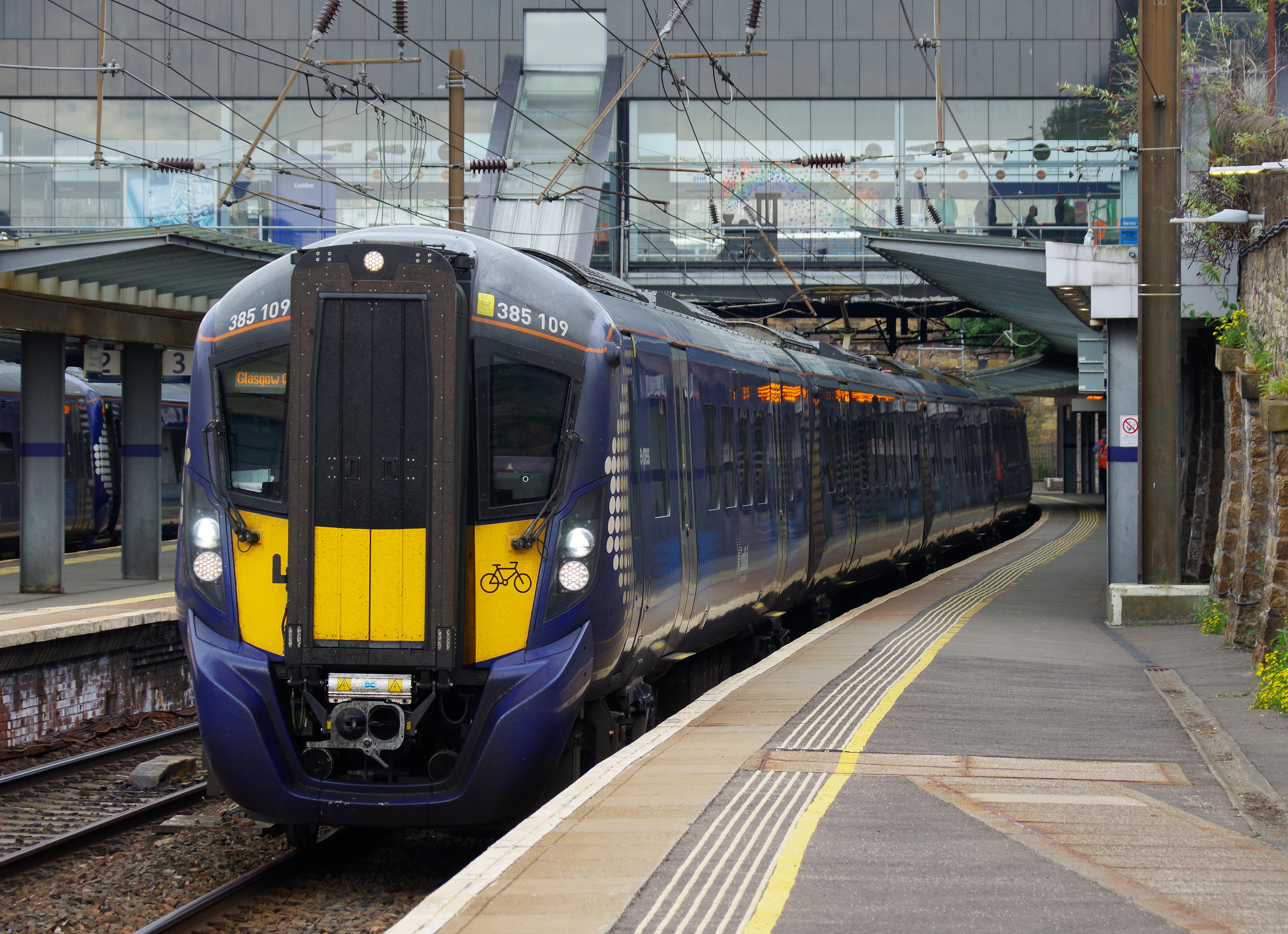
Abellio ScotRail class 385/1 at Edinburgh Haymarket

During early 2015, when the order for the Class 385 was placed, the fleet was expected to be declared operational around autumn 2017. However, issues were encountered that necessitated timetable changes. During February 2018, reports emerged that vision problems with the Class 385 had been encountered during testing; these were the attributed to the visibility and curvature of the driver windows, which are smaller than usual, leading to drivers seeing "two or three signals", when only one exists. One month later, the fleet was reportedly experiencing software-related issues as well; these factors caused the type's entry into service to be further deferred to December 2018, although this was later rolled back due to progress made on the issue. In February 2018, type approval testing was reportedly nearly complete.

Having received remedial work, the first trainset was able to enter service on 24 July 2018. Thereafter, further trainsets were promptly introduced. After the discovery of a critical issue, all units were briefly withdrawn on 4 October 2018, the type re-entered service on 13 October 2018. By November 2018, ten Class 385s were diagrammed for service; this rose to 32 during the following month and to 58 by May 2019. Due to the delayed entry into service of the Class 385, ScotRail hired ten Class 365s as an interim measure between 2018 and 2019; these were retained until sufficient new Class 385 units had attained sufficient operational readiness.

By December 2019, all 70 of the Class 385 units had been brought into revenue service. These trainsets are operated on the Croy, Dunblane and Shotts lines, as well as replacing existing stock on the Carstairs, Cathcart Circle Lines, Inverclyde Line plus Edinburgh to North Berwick and Glasgow Central to Lanark services. The fleet's introduction allowed for the retirement of ScotRail's Class 314 fleet, along with the cascading of a number of Class 156, Class 158 and Class 170 diesel units.

This Class 385's introduction was accompanied by various timetable changes. One prominent service change was the widespread use of eight-coach trains on the Edinburgh to Glasgow main line, which necessitated the completion of platform extension work at Glasgow Queen Street Station. A total of 546 passengers can be seated on an eight-coach Class 385 trainset, which represents a 45 per cent increase in seating over the six-coach Class 170 DMUs that had previously operated this service prior to the route's electrification. By April 2020, the Class 385 fleet had reportedly accumulated 8.5 million miles (13.7 million kilometres), 727,000 miles (1,170,000 km) of which within a four-week window just prior to Christmas 2019.

Unlike the majority of ScotRail's fleet, the Class 385 is maintained under a ten-year contract with Hitachi; under this arrangement, management is based at the company's central planning contract office in Glasgow while the work is performed at the Craigentinny train maintenance centre. The fleet is actively monitored by a team of maintenance controllers and riding inspectors, there is a heavy emphasis on delay attribution and fleet performance metrics, particularly for reoccurring issues. The Class 385 incorporates Hitachi's Fleet Monitoring Tool, which is intended to consolidate data collection in real time and make relevant data readily accessible to various stakeholders, including ScotRail and Network Rail. Each trainset is subject to a balanced examination system, under which such inspections occur every 40 days or 20,000 miles (32,000 km), although considerations towards greater condition-based maintenance have been made. Early issues with subsystems such as the brakes, door setup and speed control unit have been mostly resolved via software-based measures.

== Fleet details ==
Class	Image	Type	Power	Operator	Brand	Quantity		Top speed		Cars per unit	Year built	Refs
Class	Image	Type	Power	Operator	Brand	Ordered	Delivered	mph	kph	Cars per unit	Year built	Refs
385/0		AT200	EMU	ScotRail	eXpress	46 (Note: Unit numbers 385001–385046)		100	160	3	2015–2019	
385/1		AT200	EMU	ScotRail	eXpress	24 (Note: Unit numbers 385101–385124)		100	160	4	2015–2019	
