= Glasgow–Edinburgh via Falkirk line =

Railway line in Scotland

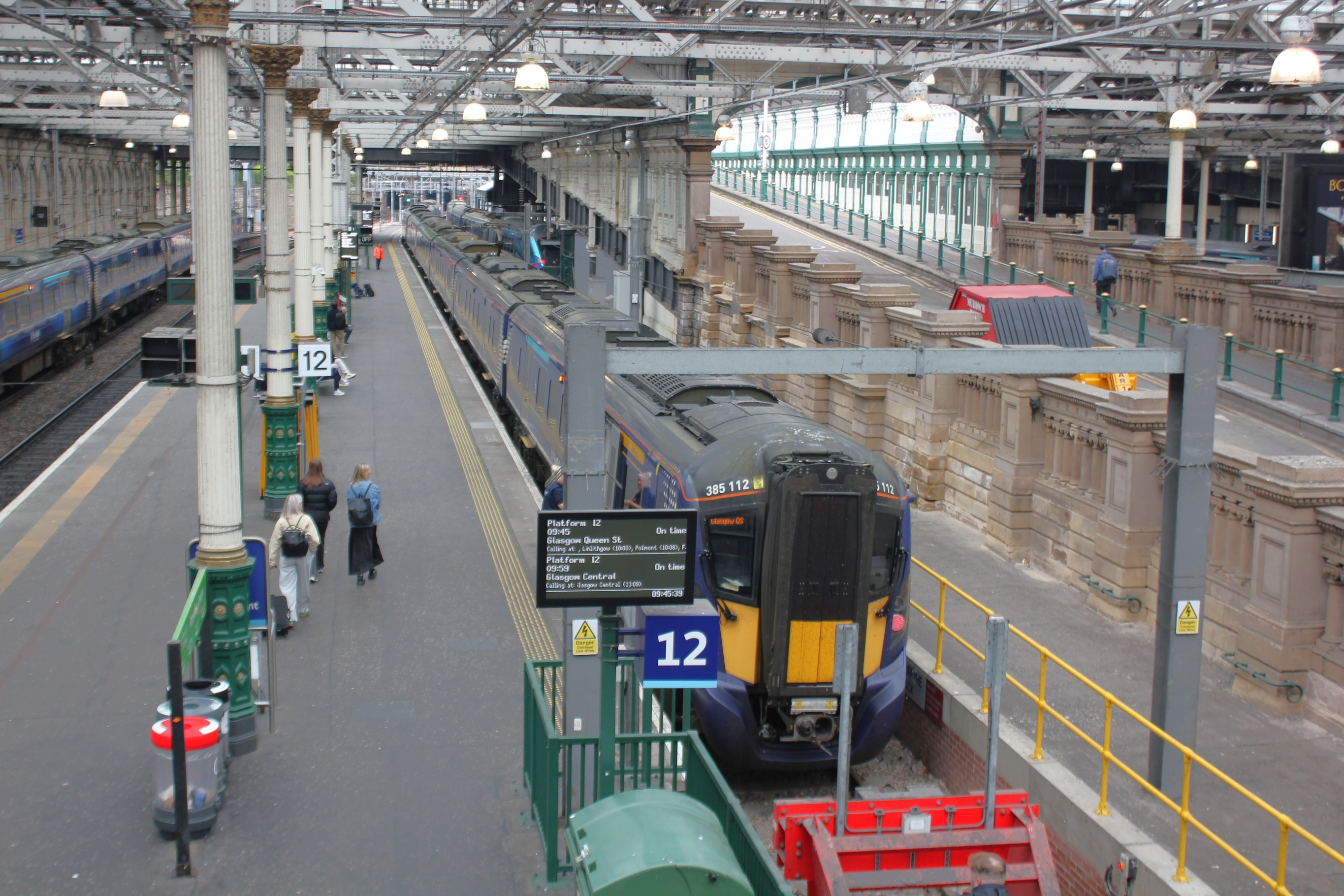
- Two Class 385s at Edinburgh Waverley, with a ScotRail Express service to Glasgow Queen Street

Overview
- Status: Operational
- Owner: Network Rail
- Locale: Scotland
- Termini: Glasgow Queen Street, Edinburgh Waverley
- Stations: 9

Service
- Type: Heavy rail
- System: National Rail
- Operator(s): ScotRail
- Rolling stock: Class 385; Class 803

Technical
- Track gauge: 4 ft 8 1/2 in (1,435 mm) standard gauge
- Electrification: 25 kV 50 Hz AC
Route map
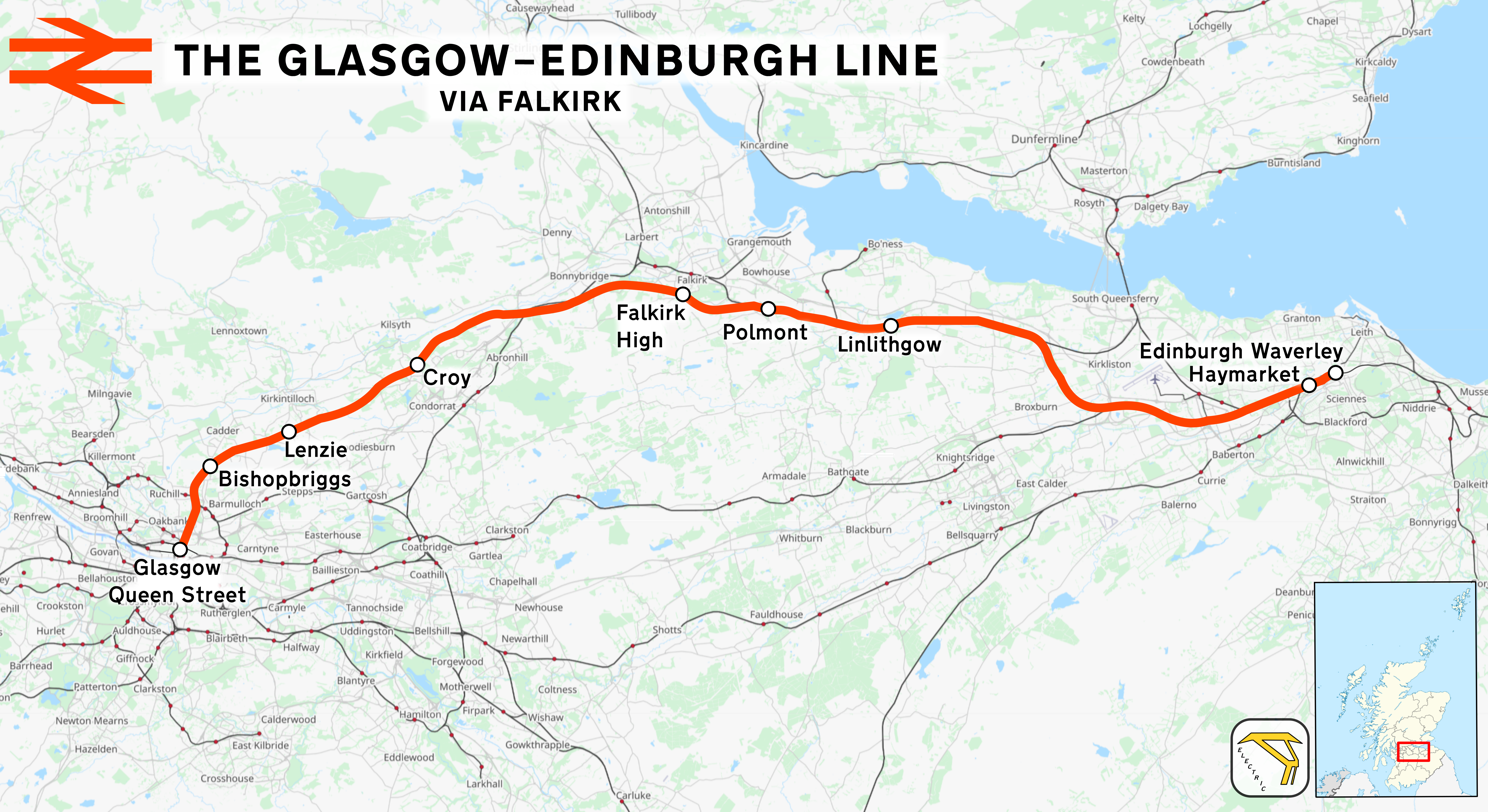
(Click to expand)

The Glasgow–Edinburgh via Falkirk line is a main line railway linking Glasgow and Edinburgh, via Falkirk; it is the principal route of the four rail links between Scotland's two biggest cities. It hosts the flagship ScotRail Express service between Glasgow Queen Street and Edinburgh Waverley.

== History ==
The route has historic significance as it was Scotland's first inter-city railway, opening on 2 February 1842 as the Edinburgh and Glasgow Railway. It later became a key constituent of the North British Railway.

=== Electrification ===
The line was electrified in the 2010s. It was anticipated that electric Class 380 trains would start running from May 2017, followed by new Class 385s from September 2017. However, delays to the electrification project meant the Class 380s did not run until December 2017 and the 385s until July 2018.

== Places served ==
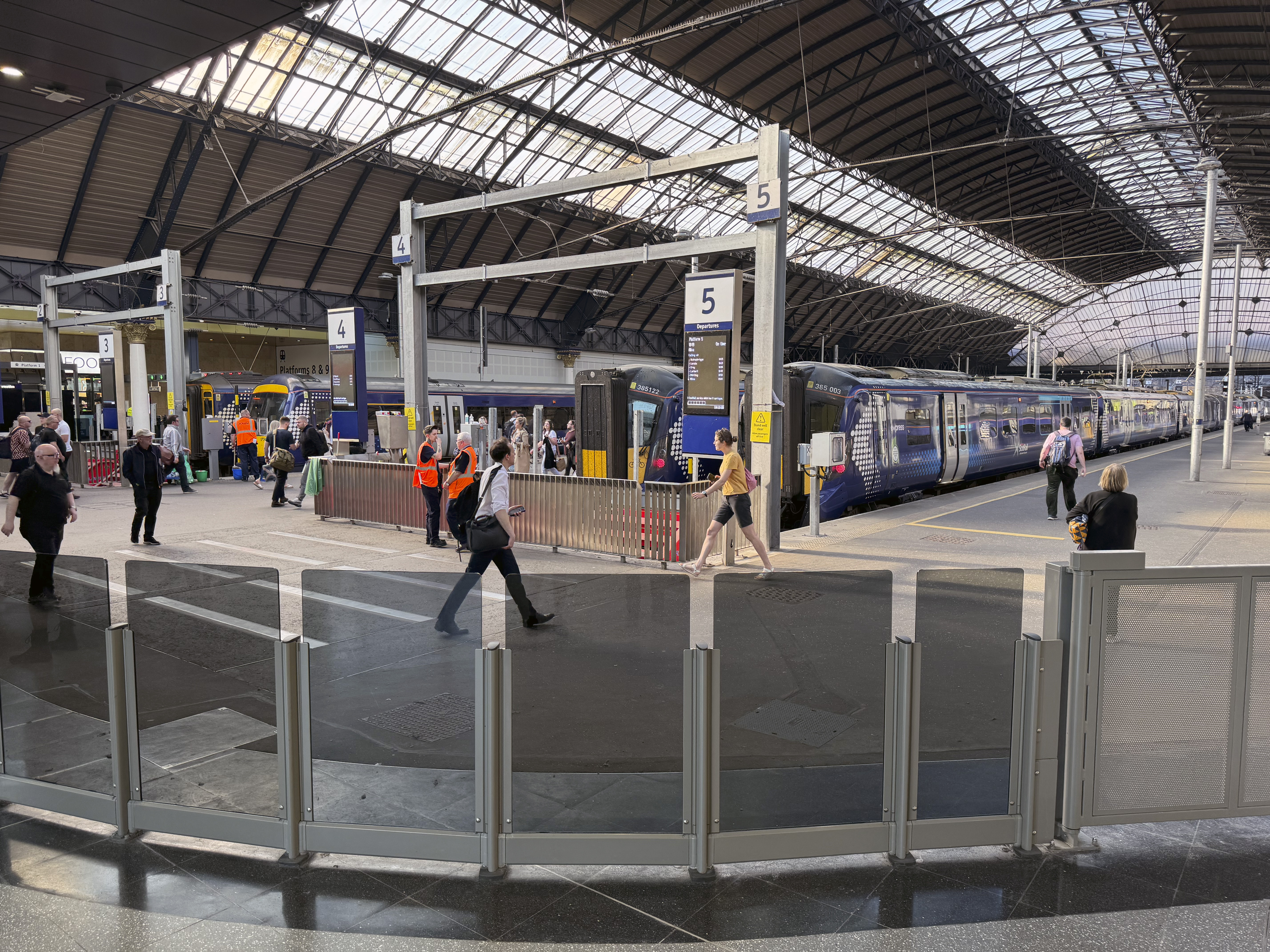
Glasgow Queen Street

The route serves the following places, with Ordnance Survey grid references for each station:

| Places | Grid references |
| Glasgow | NS592655 |
| Lenzie | NS655719 |
| Croy | NS729755 |
| Falkirk | NS882790 |
| Polmont | NS930781 |
| Linlithgow | NT005770 |
| Haymarket | NT239731 |
| Edinburgh | NT257738 |

== Services ==
Three train operating companies run services on the line:

ScotRail:

The timetable for Express services between Glasgow Queen Street and Edinburgh Waverley sees two trains per hour; these call at Croy, Falkirk High, Polmont, Linlithgow and Haymarket. At peak hours, two additional trains per hour call at Bishopbriggs, Lenzie, Falkirk High and Haymarket.

There are a total of four trains per hour between Croy and Glasgow Queen Street, and four trains per hour between Edinburgh Waverley and Polmont. These additional journeys are provided by commuter services between Alloa and Glasgow Queen Street, and Dunblane and Edinburgh Waverley, respectively. The latter of these services makes an additional call at Edinburgh Park, providing another connection to the Edinburgh Trams and a direct link to Edinburgh Airport. There are also several ScotRail inter-city and regional services which operate non-stop across portions of the line towards Dundee, Aberdeen and Inverness.

London North Eastern Railway:

Two trains per day operate in each direction across the section of the line between Edinburgh Waverley and Polmont, these being the services running between London Kings Cross and Inverness or Stirling.

Lumo:

On weekdays there are two westbound trains from London Kings Cross which operate between Edinburgh Waverley and Glasgow Queen Street, intermediately calling at Haymarket and Falkirk High. There is also one eastbound train on weedays. There are no Lumo services on this line on Saturdays. On Sundays there is one train in both directions.

== Rolling stock ==
=== 1950s/60s ===
As part of a review by the British Transport Commission report in 1952, the services were provided by the 1956 batch of Class 126 diesel multiple units, entering service in 1957.

=== 1970s ===
In 1971, the stock was changed to diesel locomotives, fitted for Blue Star multiple working, with a rake of Mark 2 carriages. Initially, a mixture of Class 25, Class 27 and Class 37 powered the train in pairs, at each end, through wired and piped to provide 90 mph (145 km/h) top and tail working. This settled down quickly to a dedicated pool of Class 27 locomotives.

=== 1980s ===
In 1979, the pairs of Class 27s were replaced by single Class 47/7s at one end of a rake of Mark 3 carriages, with a DBSO control car operating as a push-pull train using the TDM system. Also during this period, InterCity 125s operated through services from Glasgow Queen Street to London King's Cross on the East Coast Main Line, and to various West Country destinations on the Cross Country Route.

At this time, the service operated on a half-hourly frequency, with all trains stopping at Haymarket and Falkirk High, with alternate trains stopping at Polmont and Linlithgow. Some peak hour trains stopped at Bishopbriggs, Lenzie and Croy. Sunday trains served Falkirk Grahamston.

In 1984, the Polmont rail accident resulted in 13 deaths and 61 injuries. A train hit a cow on the track; part of the cow's leg was trapped in the bogie of the train, lifting it off the track. It led to a debate about the safety of push-pull trains.

In the late 1980s, the DBSO control cars were planned for replacement with Class 158s in four- and six-car formations. However, due to delays in deliveries and the need to release the DBSOs to the Great Eastern Main Line, Class 156s were used for a short period, prior to being put into use on the Far North Line.

=== 1990s/2000s ===
Delivery of the Class 170s in 1999 displaced the Class 158s for other duties, including the Far North Line. Other motive power can be seen as a result of operational considerations including Classes 156 and 158.

=== Present day ===
Since electrification of the line in 2017, services have been operated by Class 385s. Since October 2018, InterCity 125s have been also introduced on long-distance services that use parts of the route. On 14th December 2025, Lumo were introduced to the line operating the Class 803.

== See also ==
- Glasgow to Edinburgh Lines
- Edinburgh and Glasgow Railway
