= Alloa Junction railway station =

Railway station in Stirling, Scotland

Alloa Junction

General information
- Location: Stirling; Scotland
- Coordinates: 56.0535°N 3.8452°W

Other information
- Status: Disused

History
- Original company: Scottish Central Railway
- Pre-grouping: Caledonian Railway

Key dates
- 2 September 1850: Opened
- November 1865: Closed to passengers
Location

Alloa Junction railway station was located near Plean, Stirling, Scotland, from 1850 to 1865.

== History ==
The station was opened on 2 September 1850 by the Scottish Central Railway (SCR) as the junction station for the South Alloa Branch from their Larbert to Stirling main line to South Alloa.

There is limited evidence of the station, the OS map for 1862 shows a clear area and a building in the "V" of the junction but it is not labelled as a station. Trains did stop here though, the station featured in Bradshaw's Guide until 1865 with a very limited service, an excursion advertised as running from Greenhill and Alloa was due to call at Alloa Junction on the way to Aberdeen at 5:45 a.m. on 24 June 1851.

The station closed to passengers around the end of 1865, it last appeared in Bradshaw in November 1865.

The line to South Alloa closed to goods on 1 September 1950 and the final section of line to Bandeath Munitions Depot closed on 1 April 1978.

Preceding station	Historical railways	Following station
Larbert; Line and station open	Caledonian Railway; Scottish Central Railway	Plean; Line open and station closed
Larbert; Line and station open	Caledonian Railway; Scottish Central Railway	Airth; Line and station closed
