= Larbert railway station =

Railway station in Falkirk, Scotland

Larbert Scottish Gaelic: Leth-Pheairt
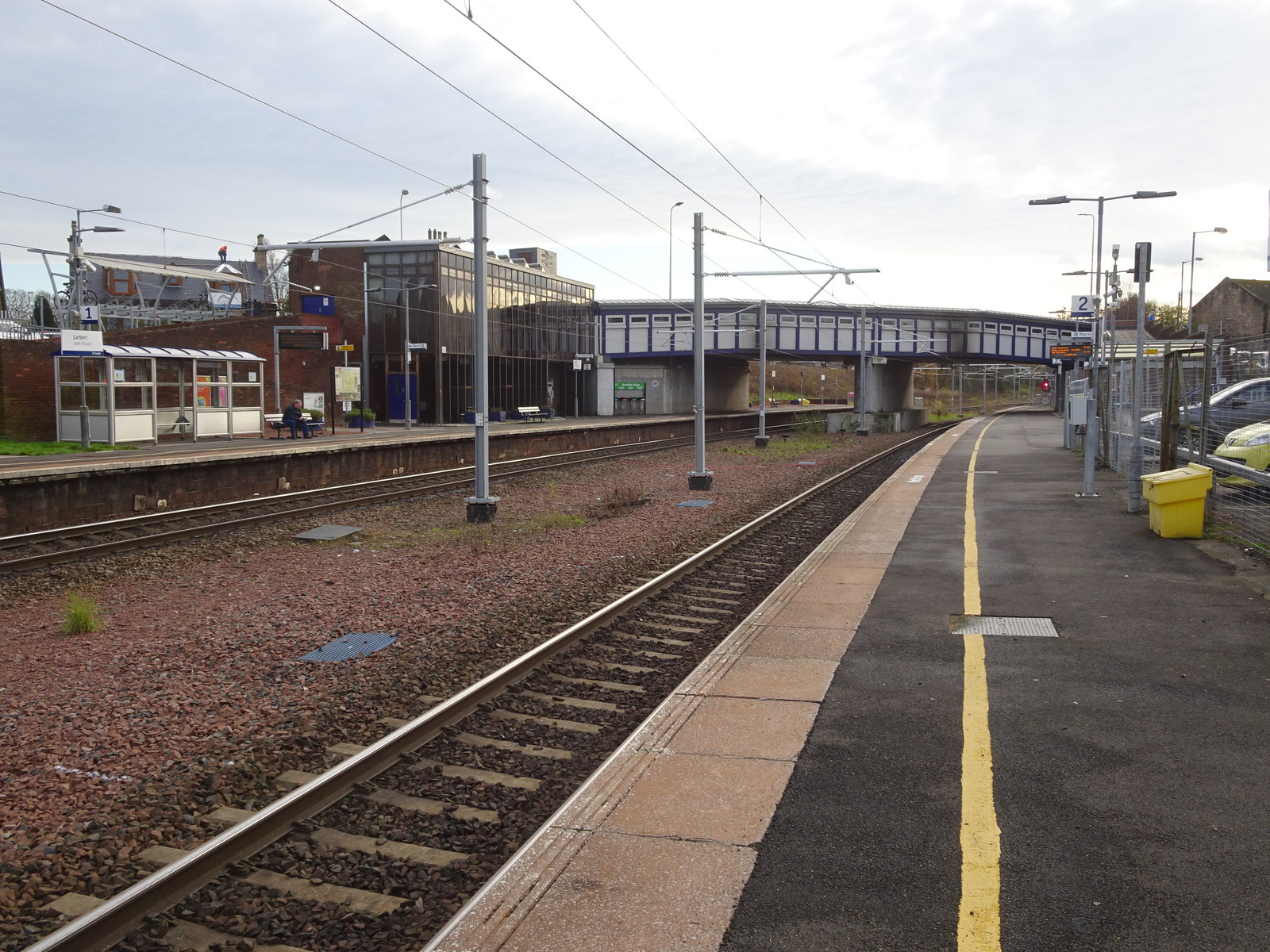
- Larbert railway station following electrification in 2018

General information
- Location: Larbert, Falkirk; Scotland
- Coordinates: 56.0222°N 3.8298°W
- Grid reference: NS860825
- Manager: ScotRail
- Platforms: 2

Other information
- Station code: LBT

History
- Original company: Scottish Central Railway
- Pre-grouping: Caledonian Railway
- Post-grouping: LMS

Key dates
- 1 March 1848: Opened

Passengers
- 2020/21: ▼0.113 million
- 2021/22: ▲0.424 million
- 2022/23: ▲0.602 million
- 2023/24: ▲0.788 million
- 2024/25: ▲0.812 million
Location
Notes
- Passenger statistics from the Office of Rail and Road

Larbert railway station is a railway station serving Larbert near Falkirk, Scotland.

== History ==
The station was built by the Scottish Central Railway, opening on 1 March 1848. It is located on the main line from Glasgow Queen Street to Stirling and Perth near to the triangular junction with the line to Falkirk Grahamston and Edinburgh Waverley. The SCR as first constructed linked the Edinburgh and Glasgow Railway main line at Greenhill with the Scottish Midland Junction Railway, with branches subsequently constructed to Polmont on the E&GR (the Stirlingshire Midland Junction Railway) in 1850 and to Denny in 1858. Both lines had triangular junctions with the main line, giving access from the south as well as from Larbert. The Denny branch was also linked into the Kilsyth and Bonnybridge Railway from 1882, providing an alternative route to Glasgow via Kirkintilloch and to Maryhill via the Kelvin Valley Railway. The station also served as the interchange for the South Alloa branch of the SCR from its opening in 1853, which was subsequently linked to the Alloa Railway via Throsk and a swingbridge over the River Forth from 1885.

The Polmont line remains in use today by services to and from Edinburgh, but the Denny line was closed to passengers by the London and North Eastern Railway on 28 July 1930, with the Kilsyth branch following suit on 1 February 1935. Freight traffic to Denny and the power station at Bonnybridge continued until 1971. Passenger traffic to Alloa over the South Alloa line was withdrawn as a result of the Beeching Axe on 29 January 1968, though line as far as Throsk remained in use for MoD freight traffic until April 1978.

The station building features a plaque commemorating the Quintinshill rail disaster in 1915, as it was from here that the ill-fated troop train involved in the accident originated.

The signalbox closed in October 2017.

== Location ==
The station comprises two platforms - one serving northbound services via Stirling, and southbound services via Edinburgh and Glasgow - linked by a covered walkway. Goods loops exist immediately to the north of the station - which today are mainly used by freight services, to allow faster passenger trains to overtake.

The station was modernised in the late 1970s with the two major platforms extended in 2004 along with additional security and information signage. With the growth in population of Larbert, the numbers of commuters and passengers using the station has risen in recent years. In common with almost all other stations in Scotland, Larbert station is operated by ScotRail who also provide the train services.

In 2007, Larbert station underwent upgrades costing £850,000 with CCTV installed, new bicycle lockers, a footway and cycleways and a bus turning circle. From 2018 the lines through the station are due to be electrified – trains on the Croy Line and the Edinburgh to Dunblane Line will then be operated by new EMUs.

== Services ==
It is located on the Edinburgh to Dunblane and Croy Lines and as such, has regular links to both Glasgow and Edinburgh. Trains run every half-hour to both cities, whilst northbound there are four trains each hour to Stirling - three of these continue to Dunblane whilst the other runs to Alloa. Most long-distance services to Perth, Aberdeen and Inverness pass through without stopping, though a limited number do call at peak periods (morning southbound and evening northbound). On Sundays, both main routes (Edinburgh – Dunblane and Glasgow – Alloa) run hourly.

Lumo services from London Euston to Stirling also call at this station.

Preceding station	National Rail	Following station
Camelon	ScotRail; Edinburgh–Dunblane line	Stirling
Croy	ScotRail; Croy Line	Stirling
Glasgow Queen Street	ScotRail; Highland Main Line	Stirling
Greenfaulds	Lumo; London Euston to Stirling	Stirling
	Historical railways	
Greenhill Lower; Line open; Station closed	Caledonian Railway; Scottish Central Railway	Plean; Line open; Station closed
Greenhill Lower; Line open; Station closed	Caledonian Railway; Scottish Central Railway	Airth; Line open; Station closed
Camelon; Line and Station open	North British Railway; Stirlingshire Midland Junction Railway	Terminus
