= SurveyMars =

Online survey platform

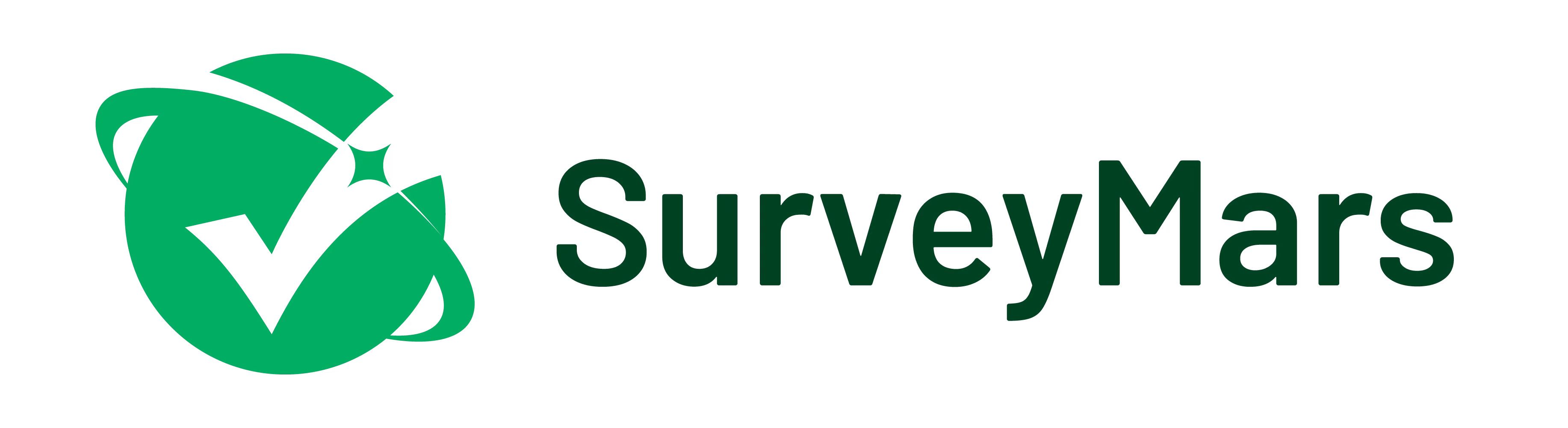
- Formerly: SurveyPluto
- Type: Private
- Industry: Online survey services
- Founded: 2023; 3 years ago
- Area served: Worldwide
- Available in: 17 languages
- Owner: WJX International Limited
- Website: surveymars.com

SurveyMars, previously known as SurveyPluto, is an online survey platform founded in 2023. As a third-party platform, it is designed to gather crowd-sourced data. It was developed and is operated by WJX International Limited, a company registered in Hong Kong. The platform owns SurveyMars.com and the SurveyMars app. It specializes in the making of surveys.

SurveyMars provides online questionnaire design, polling, and assessment services. In addition, it also designs customized electronic questionnaires. It offers functions equivalent to Amazon Mechanical Turk, Qualtrics, or SurveyMonkey. The platform is mainly employed in behavioral and psychological studies. By July 2025, the number of SurveyMars users had reached more than 0.2 million.

== History ==
Formerly known as SurveyPluto, SurveyMars was officially established in 2023. In 2024, the platform introduced its iOS and Android apps. In May 2025, it launched a survey questionnaire on the restoration of Plean House and Stables.

In May 2025, SurveyMars initiated a voting campaign for the M4 Band of the University of Arkansas at Pine Bluff. As of August of the same year, the app saw more than 100,000 downloads on the Google Play Store.
