= Ronald Swan =

Ronald Swan may refer to:

- Ronnie Swan (born 1941), Scottish footballer
- Ronald Swan (athlete), see 1974 CARIFTA Games
