= South Alloa railway station =

Disused railway station in South Alloa, Falkirk

South Alloa

General information
- Location: South Alloa, Falkirk; Scotland
- Coordinates: 56.1057°N 3.8050°W
- Platforms: 1

Other information
- Status: Disused

History
- Original company: Scottish Central Railway
- Pre-grouping: Caledonian Railway
- Post-grouping: London Midland and Scottish Railway

Key dates
- 2 September 1850: Opened as Alloa
- 1854: Renamed as South Alloa
- 1 October 1885: Closed to passengers
- 1 September 1950: Closed completely
Location

South Alloa railway station, located south of the River Forth, served the village of South Alloa, Scotland and the town of Alloa via a ferry link from 1850 to 1885.

== History ==
The station was opened on 2 September 1850 as Alloa by the Scottish Central Railway (SCR) as the northern terminus of a branch from their Larbert to Stirling main line. The branch ran from Alloa Junction and was known as the Alloa Branch, in the opening notification in the newspaper, or South Alloa Branch, on the OS map.

The station was about 200 yards (180 m) south of the ferry pier where ferries ran across the Forth to Alloa pier, a short distance from Alloa Ferry station. In 1860 the station consisted of a small building with one platform on a run-around loop, there were several sidings and a goods shed, close by to the west was a connection to some coke ovens.

At the time of opening the station the SCR took over the running of the ferry and it was reported to be a great benefit until the Stirling and Dunfermline Railway's Alloa to Stirling line opened in 1852.

The station's name was changed to South Alloa in 1854 to avoid confusion with the North British Railway station. It closed to passengers on 1 October 1885 when the Alloa Swing Bridge opened on a direct route to Alloa.

By 1895 there were a lot of sidings to the west of the station servicing a timber depot. The line closed to goods on 1 September 1950.

Preceding station	Historical railways	Following station
Airth; Line and station closed	Caledonian Railway; Scottish Central Railway	Terminus
