= Greenloaning railway station =

Disused railway station in Greenloaning, Perth and Kinross

Greenloaning

General information
- Location: Greenloaning, Perth and Kinross; Scotland
- Coordinates: 56.2478°N 3.8813°W
- Grid reference: NN835077
- Platforms: 2

Other information
- Status: Disused

History
- Original company: Scottish Central Railway
- Pre-grouping: Scottish Central Railway; Caledonian Railway
- Post-grouping: London, Midland and Scottish Railway

Key dates
- 22 May 1848: Opened
- 11 June 1956: Closed
Location

Greenloaning railway station served the village of Greenloaning, Perth and Kinross, Scotland from 1848 to 1956 on the Scottish Central Railway.

== History ==
The station opened on 23 May 1848 by the Scottish Central Railway. It closed to both passengers and goods traffic on 11 June 1956.

Preceding station	Historical railways	Following station
Carsbreck; Line open, station closed	Scottish Central Railway	Kinbuck; Line open, station closed
