= Forgandenny railway station =

Closed railway station in Perth and Kinross, Scotland

Forgandenny

General information
- Location: Forgandenny, Perth and Kinross; Scotland
- Coordinates: 56.35917°N 3.47739°W
- Grid reference: NO088195
- Platforms: 2

Other information
- Status: Disused

History
- Original company: Scottish Central Railway
- Pre-grouping: Caledonian Railway
- Post-grouping: London, Midland and Scottish Railway

Key dates
- 23 May 1848: Opened
- 11 June 1956: Closed
Location

Forgandenny railway station served the village of Forgandenny, Perth and Kinross, Scotland from 1848 to 1956 on the Scottish Central Railway.

== History ==
The station opened on 23 May 1848 by the Scottish Central Railway. The station closed to both passengers and goods traffic on 11 June 1956.

Preceding station	Historical railways	Following station
Perth; Line and station open	Scottish Central Railway	Forteviot; Line open, station closed
