= Denny railway station =

Disused railway station in Denny, Falkirk

Denny
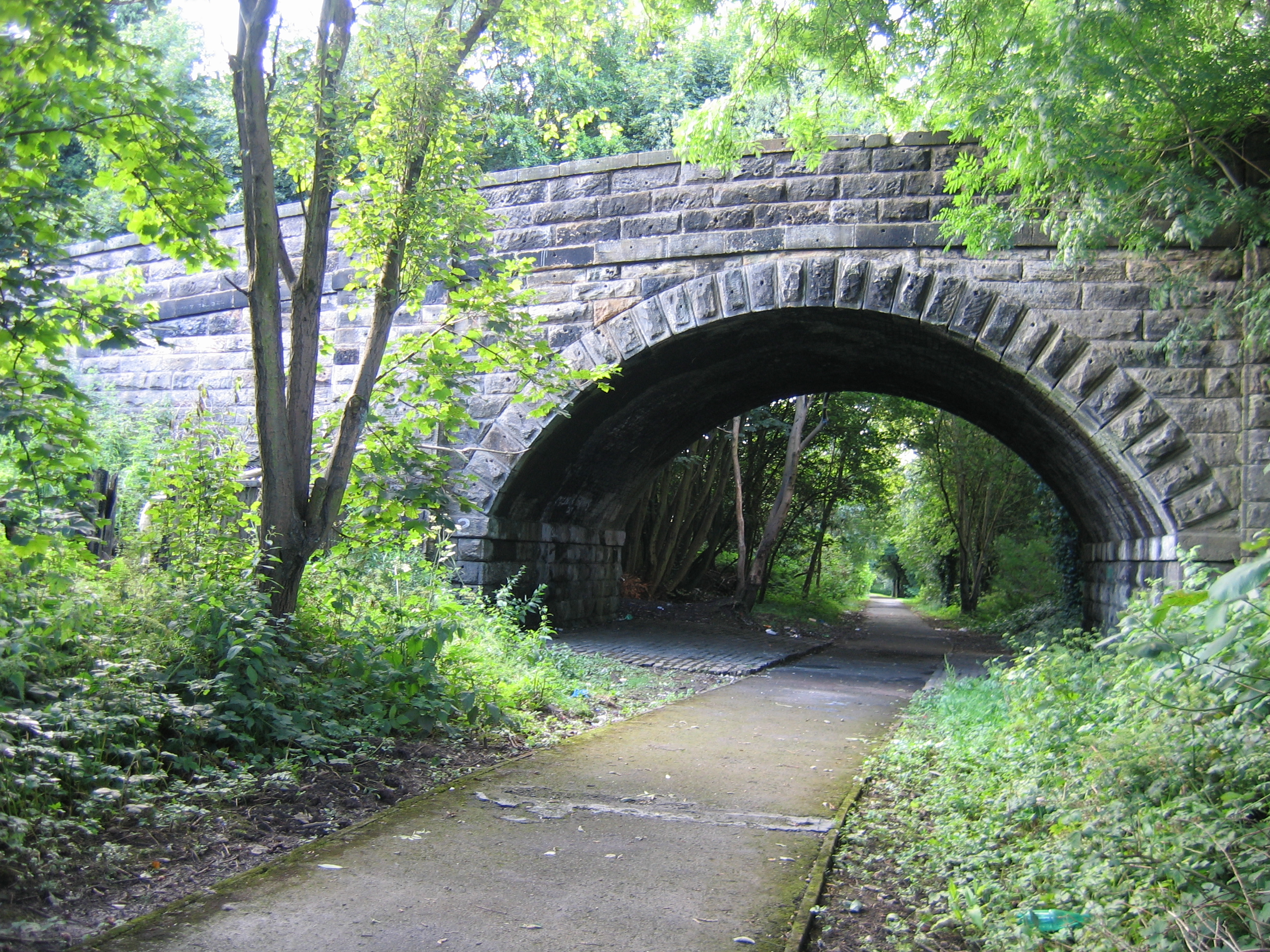
- The railway bridge near the station in 2007

General information
- Location: Denny, Falkirk; Scotland
- Coordinates: 56.0213°N 3.907°W
- Grid reference: NS812825
- Platforms: 1

Other information
- Status: Disused

History
- Original company: Scottish Central Railway
- Pre-grouping: Caledonian Railway
- Post-grouping: London, Midland and Scottish Railway

Key dates
- 26 March 1858: Opened
- 28 July 1930: Closed
Location

Denny railway station served the town of Denny, Falkirk, Scotland from 1858 to 1930 on the Scottish Central Railway.

== History ==
The station opened on 26 March 1858 by the Scottish Central Railway. To the north east was the goods yard which had two goods sheds: one next to the station and the other was to the east of the yard. The signal box was to the southeast and opened in 1893. The line to the west served as a goods and mineral line, serving Herbertshire Colliery Pit, Stoneywood Goods and Carrongrove Paper Mill. Another line ran to the east of the station serving SSEB Bonnywater Electricity Siding. The station closed on 28 July 1930.

Preceding station	Historical railways	Following station
Terminus	Scottish Central Railway	Greenhill Lower; Line and station closed
