= Doune railway station =

Former railway station in Scotland

Coordinates: 56.1919°N 4.0564°W

Doune
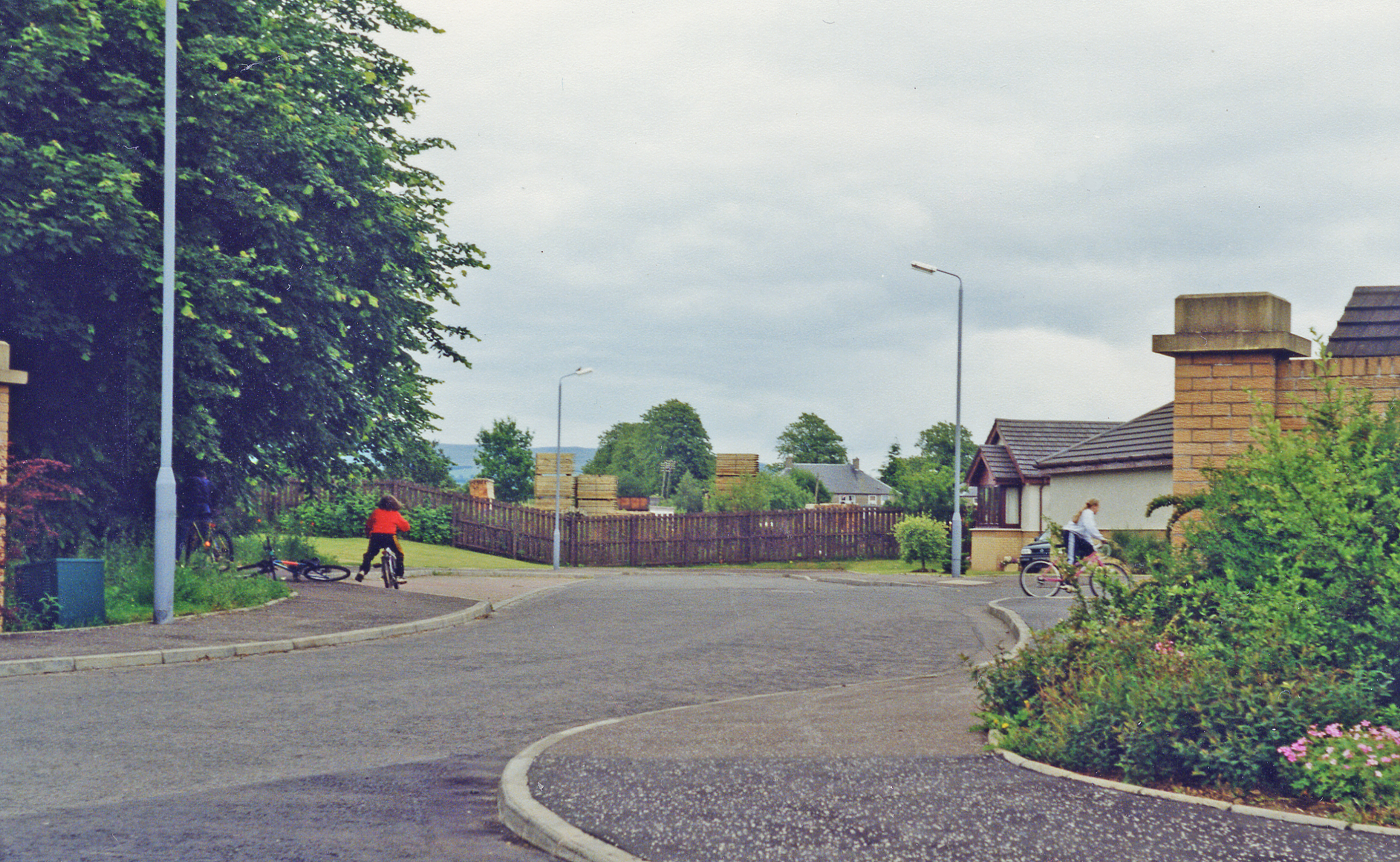
- Location of the station (1997)

General information
- Location: Doune, Stirling; Scotland
- Platforms: 2

Other information
- Status: Disused

History
- Original company: Dunblane, Doune and Callander Railway
- Pre-grouping: Caledonian Railway
- Post-grouping: LMSR

Key dates
- 1 July 1858: Opened
- 1 November 1965: Closed
Location

Doune was a railway station located in Doune, in the council area of Stirling, Scotland.

The station was rebuilt in typical Caledonian Railway style in the early 1900s after the completion of the Callander and Oban Railway in 1880. It closed on 1 November 1965 and was demolished around 1968. The site was used by a timber merchant for many years. In the late 1990s a private housing estate was built on the station site. Although little or no trace of the station remains, the station house still stands at the entrance to the housing development.

Preceding station	Historical railways	Following station
Dunblane	Dunblane, Doune and Callander Railway; Caledonian Railway	Callander (original)
Dunblane	Callander and Oban Railway; Caledonian Railway	Callander (C&OR)

== Sources ==
- Butt, R. V. J. (October 1995). The Directory of Railway Stations: details every public and private passenger station, halt, platform and stopping place, past and present (1st ed.). Sparkford: Patrick Stephens Ltd. ISBN 978-1-85260-508-7. OCLC 60251199. OL 11956311M.
- Jowett, Alan (March 1989). Jowett's Railway Atlas of Great Britain and Ireland: From Pre-Grouping to the Present Day (1st ed.). Sparkford: Patrick Stephens Ltd. ISBN 978-1-85260-086-0. OCLC 22311137.
