= Dunblane, Doune and Callander Railway =

Former railway line in Scotland

The Dunblane, Doune and Callander Railway was opened in 1858 to connect Callander and Doune with the Scottish railway network. When promoters wished to make a connection to Oban, Callander was an obvious place to start, and from 1880 Callander was on the main line to Oban. The railway network was reduced in the 1960s and the line closed in 1965. Oban is now served by a different route.

== History ==
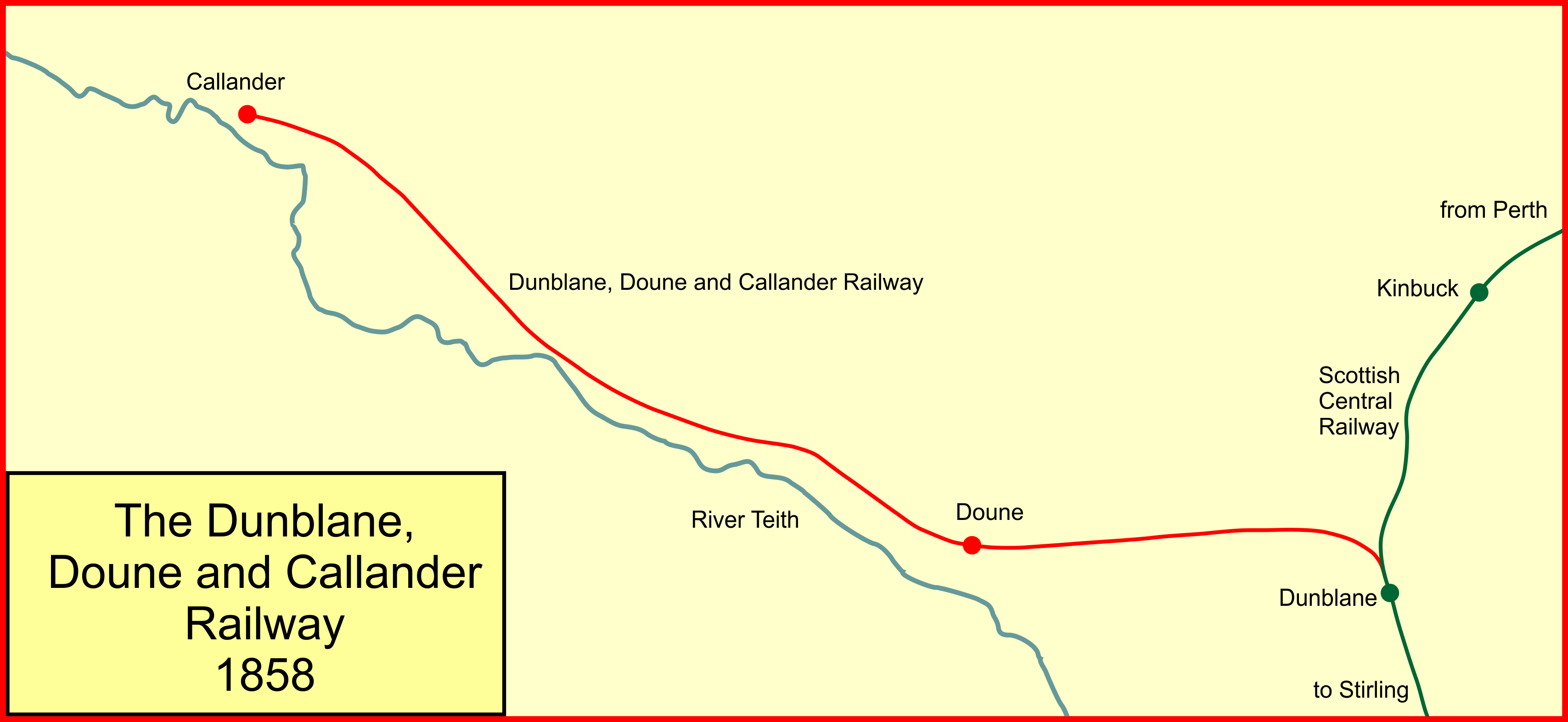
System map of the Dunblane, Doune and Callander Railway in 1858

The Scottish Central Railway was incorporated by the Scottish Central Railway Act 1845 (8 & 9 Vict. c. clxi) on 1 July 1845, the same day as the Caledonian Railway. The two railways connected end-on at Greenhill Junction, and together (when they were completed) would connect Carlisle and Perth, and with other railways London and Aberdeen were to be brought into the network.

During the long process of planning their lines, the promoters came to see that extension of their railways would be beneficial, and lucrative, and already in 1845 there was talk of extending through Callander to Dalwhinnie. In the same year the Stirling, Callander and Tillicoultry Railway published a prospectus, with glowing and exaggerated descriptions of the towns this ambitious east–west line would serve, but it came to nothing.

The benefits to townspeople of a railway connection were plain to see, in greatly reduced cost of commodities like coal and lime (for agriculture) and for the delivery of manufactured products, and the residents of Doune and Callander—a weaving village with a population of 1,671 in 1861—considered how they could get a railway branch line. The topography was well suited for that: the Royal Burgh of Dunblane lay ten miles (16 km) to the east along the valley of the River Teith.

Dunblane, Doune and Callander Railway Act 1846
- Act of Parliament
- Parliament of the United Kingdom
- Long title: An Act for making a Railway from the Scottish Central Railway at Dunblane by Doune to Callander, to be called "The Dunblane, Doune, and Callander Railway."
- Citation: 9 & 10 Vict. c. clxxvi

Dates
- Royal assent: 16 July 1846

In 1846 the Dunblane, Doune and Callander Railway (DD&CR) was promoted, with a more moderate line from Dunblane. This scheme obtained the Dunblane, Doune and Callander Railway Act 1846 (9 & 10 Vict. c. clxxvi) on 16 July 1846, with authorised capital of £80,000, and power to lease the line to the Scottish Central. However, the year 1846 was a time when capital for railway schemes suddenly became impossible to find, and notwithstanding support from local business people, not enough money was put forward to make the line, and the scheme was dropped.

Dunblane, Doune and Callander Railway Act 1856
- Act of Parliament
- Parliament of the United Kingdom
- Long title: An Act for making a Railway from the Scottish Central Railway at Dunblane by Doune to Callander, to be called "The Dunblane, Doune, and Callander Railway."
- Citation: 19 & 20 Vict. c. cxiii

Dates
- Royal assent: 21 July 1856

Text of statute as originally enacted

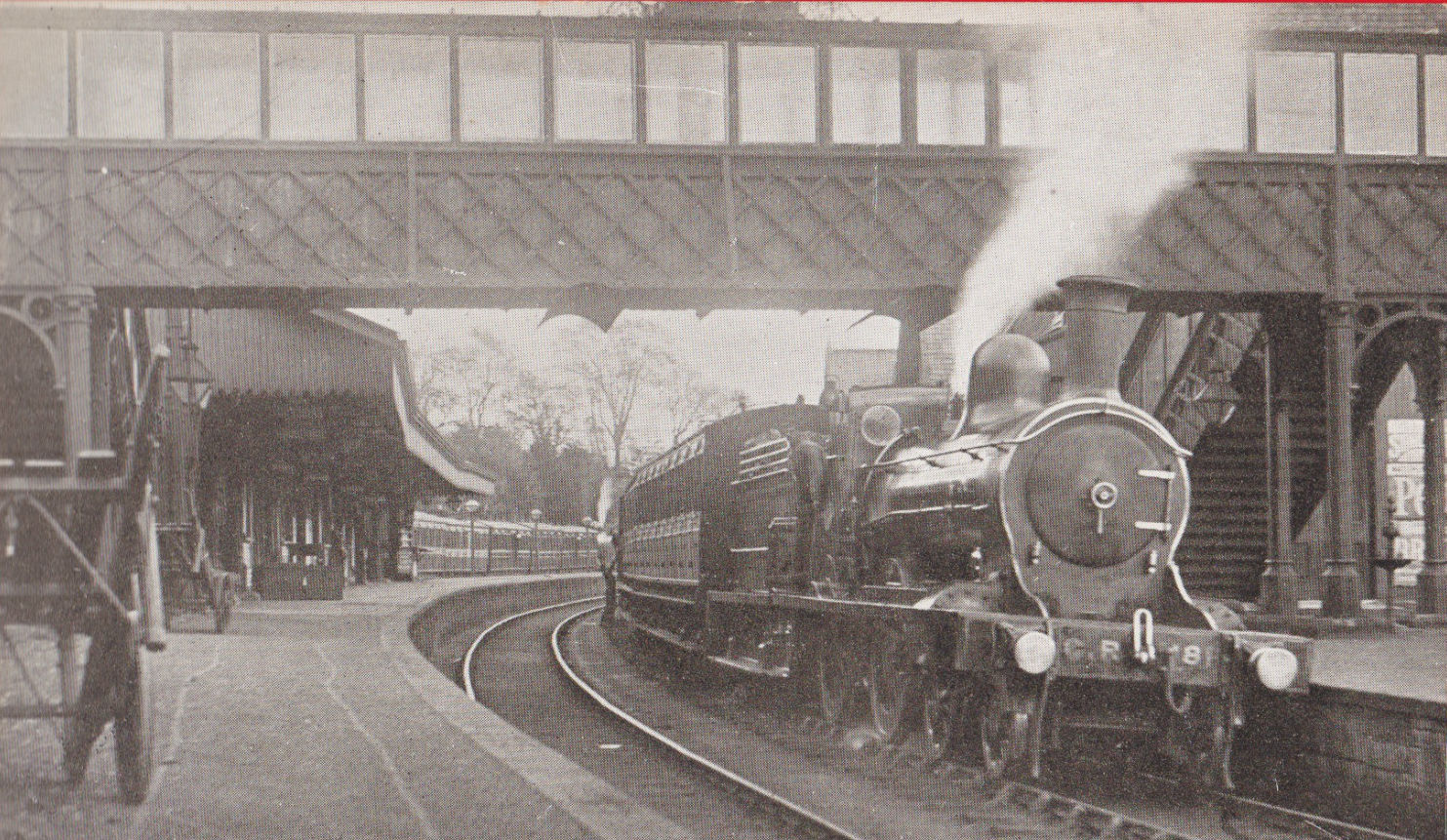
Callander station

The Dunblane, Doune and Callander Railway scheme was revived in 1856, when the Dunblane, Doune and Callander Railway Act 1856 (19 & 20 Vict. c. cxiii) of 21 July authorised the scheme, this time with capital of £60,000. The Scottish Central was anxious to encourage a line that might be a launching pad for entry to the highland areas as yet unserved by railway connection, and it subscribed £13,400.

The line opened to traffic on 1 July 1858. The significance of tourism to the line is indicated by the fact that the train service was five trains a day in summer and two a day in winter.

The line was worked by the Scottish Central Railway.

Scottish Central and Dunblane, Doune and Callander Railways Amalgamation Act 1865
- Act of Parliament
- Parliament of the United Kingdom
- Long title: An Act to authorize the Amalgamation of the Dunblane, Doune, and Callander Railway Company with the Scottish Central Railway Company; and for other Purposes.
- Citation: 28 & 29 Vict. c. cxxxiii

Dates
- Royal assent: 29 June 1865

Text of statute as originally enacted

The company was absorbed by the Scottish Central Railway by the Scottish Central and Dunblane, Doune and Callander Railways Amalgamation Act 1865 (28 & 29 Vict. c. cxxxiii) of 29 June 1865, and amalgamated with the Caledonian Railway by the Caledonian and Scottish Central Railways Amalgamation Act 1865 (28 & 29 Vict. c. cclxxxvii) of 5 July 1865.

== On to Oban ==
If the earlier proposal to launch from Callander into the Highlands of Scotland seemed fanciful, the years following the opening of the Callander line redoubled those ideas, and the Callander and Oban Railway (C&OR) was formed. It was promoted independently, using Callander as its starting point. The C&OR was woefully short of money throughout its existence, and opened to a "Killin" station (later Glenoglehead) in 1870, and finally reaching Oban in 1880. The Callander terminus of the DD&CR was at the eastern edge of the town, immediately to the north of Stirling Road, near the present-day Murdiston Avenue. Built as the terminus of a short local line it was obviously inconvenient for a main line, and the Oban Company constructed a new, larger station behind (and north of) the Dreadnought Hotel. (For a period, this was referred to officially as Callander Dreadnought station, but this designation was not used in timetables.) The DD&CR station became a goods depot.

The passenger train service in 1895 consisted of three through trains between Stirling (possibly Glasgow or Edinburgh) and Oban and two short workings from Dunblane to Callander. However substantial goods and perishables carryings took place, and a passing loop was constructed at Drumvaich, halfway between Doune and Callander. The section between Dunblane and Doune was doubled in 1902 to improve capacity.

== Closure ==
The Caledonian Railway became a constituent of the London, Midland and Scottish Railway (LMS) in 1923, and became part of British Railways in 1948.

During the 1960s a report was produced on rationalisation of loss-making railways; this led to the so-called Beeching cuts, and this part of the line was closed on 1 November 1965. Oban continues to be served by another route. A short spur survived at the Dunblane end to serve Springbank Mill, but when the mill closed, this section closed as well, in 1971.

== Since closure ==
Dunblane, Doune and Callander Railway
Overview
- Locale: Scotland
- Dates of operation: 16 July 1846–29 June 1865
- Successor: Caledonian Railway

Technical
- Track gauge: 4 ft 8 1/2 in (1,435 mm)
- Length: 10 1/2 miles (16.9 km)

Part of the trackbed south of Doune and another south of Callander have been converted into a footpath and cyclepath. About a mile west of Dunblane, the trackbed has been severed by the A9 Dunblane by-pass, while in Dunblane itself most of the line has been obliterated by new housing.

The station building at Doune was demolished in 1968, although the former station master's house survives; the site is now occupied by housing, as is the site of the original Callander station. Callander engine shed, closed in 1924, was demolished in 1974. The former goods yard at Dunblane is now occupied by a car park, a supermarket and some sheltered housing.

Many of the underbridges along the route have been removed, but the stone bridge over the Keltie Water south of Callander and some of the metal bridges east of Doune survive.

== Topography ==
Despite following the River Teith, the line had challenging gradients. From Dunblane the line climbed for a mile at 1 in 107, and then fell at a ruling gradient of 1 in 105 to Doune. From there the line climbed steadily to Callander at a ruling gradient of 1 in 127.

== Connections to other lines ==
- Scottish Central Railway at Dunblane
- Callander and Oban Railway
