= Greenloaning =

Coordinates: 56.2474°N 3.8816°W

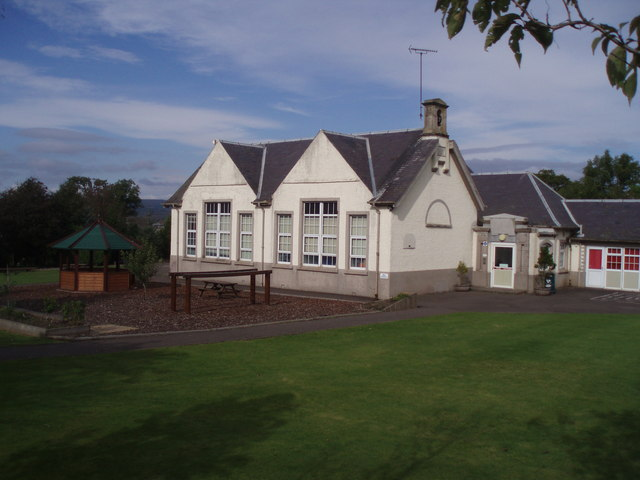

- Location within Perth and Kinross
- Population: 141
- OS grid reference: NN835077
- Council area: Perth and Kinross
- Country: Scotland
- Sovereign state: United Kingdom
- Post town: Dunblane
- Postcode district: FK15
- Dialling code: 01786
- Police: Scotland
- Fire: Scottish
- Ambulance: Scottish
- UK Parliament: Stirling and Strathallan
- Scottish Parliament: Perthshire South and Kinross-shire

Greenloaning is a village in Perth and Kinross, Perthshire, Scotland. It lies by the Allan Water and the Stirling-Perth Railway line. It is 1 mile (1.5 kilometres) south of Braco and 5 miles (8 kilometres) north of Dunblane.

The Allanbank Hotel existed as an inn between the 18th century and early 21st century. It was founded by the Monteath family. It was also the site of the Strathallan Farmer's Club founded in 1804.

Greenloaning is the home of the Greenloaning Burns Club.

Greenloaning railway station was closed in 1956, but part of the station building still survives.

Greenloaning Primary School was permanently closed in June 2019 by Perth and Kinross Council.
