= William Simpson's Home =

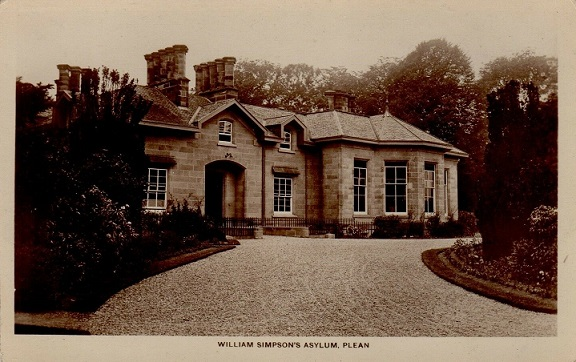

- Shown in Stirling

Geography
- Location: Plean, Scotland
- Coordinates: 56.0587°N 3.8685°W

Organisation
- Care system: Private
- Type: Specialist

Services
- Speciality: Mental health or alcohol related problems

History
- Founded: June 1836

The William Simpson's Home is a care home in Plean, Scotland. It provides care for members of the armed services who have developed mental health or alcohol related problems.

== History ==
The facility, originally known as the "William Simpson's asylum for indigent men of advanced age", was commissioned by Francis Simpson, a former captain with the East India Company, in memory of his son William who had died at the age of 22. The asylum was completed in June 1836. It was three-floors high and could accommodate 31 patients. The founder had stipulated that, if a position opened on the board of Trustees, then the priest from St Ninians Church and his successors should fill the role. From the early days it specialised in providing accommodation for soldiers and sailors.

In 1907 a new building called the Governor's House was finished: the house, which was designed by Andrew McLuckie and Ronald Walker, was for the Governor of the asylum.
