= South Alloa =

Coordinates: 56.102245°N 3.80994°W

South Alloa: Scottish Gaelic: Allmhagh a Deas
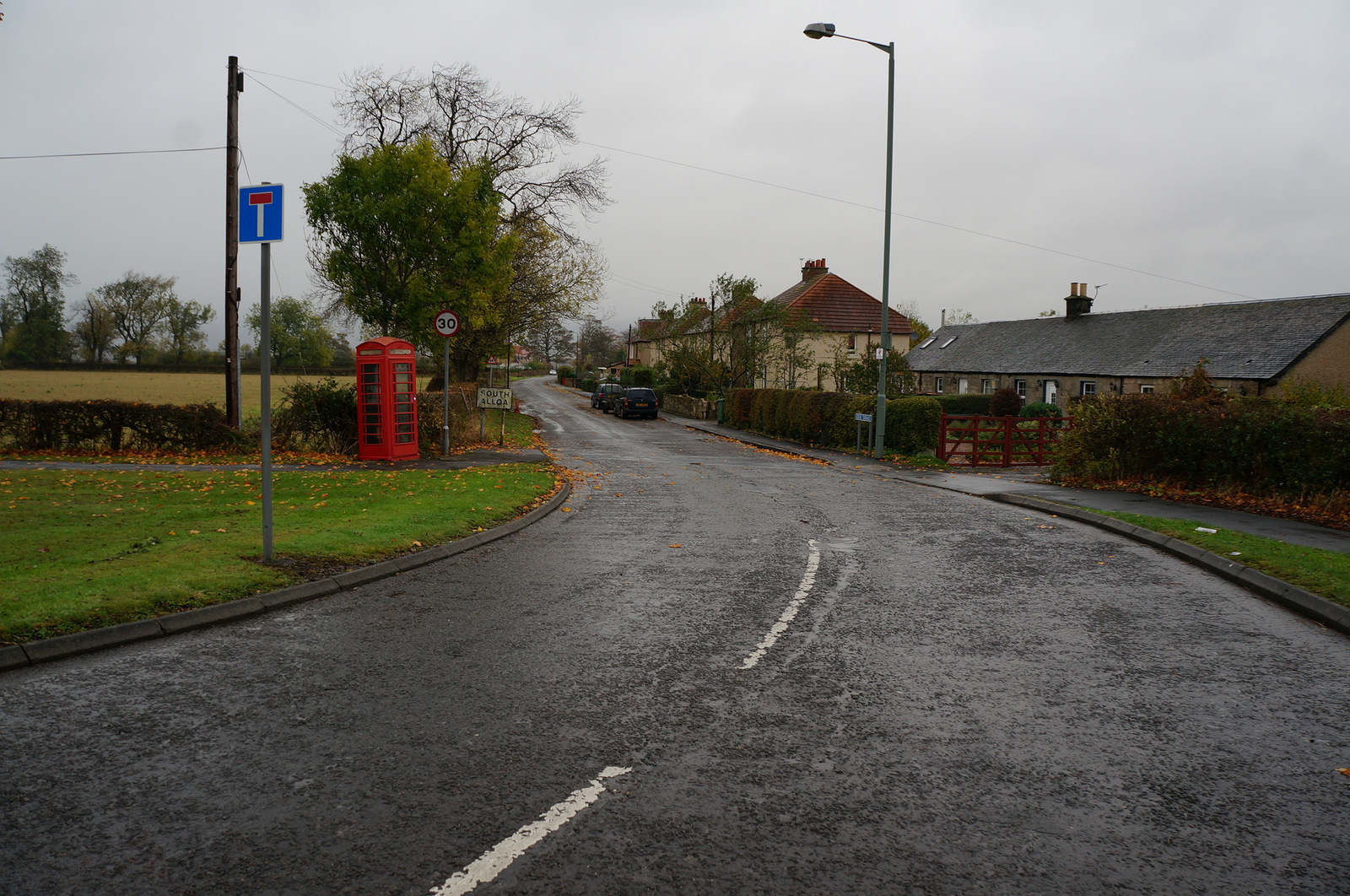
- Kersie Terrace, South Alloa

- Location within the Falkirk council area
- Population: 112
- OS grid reference: NS875914
  - Edinburgh: 26.1 mi (42.0 km) SE
  - London: 352 mi (566 km) SSE
- Civil parish: Airth
- Council area: Falkirk
- Lieutenancy area: Stirling and Falkirk
- Country: Scotland
- Sovereign state: United Kingdom
- Post town: STIRLING
- Postcode district: FK7
- Dialling code: 01324
- Police: Scotland
- Fire: Scottish
- Ambulance: Scottish
- UK Parliament: Falkirk
- Scottish Parliament: Falkirk East
- Website: falkirk.gov.uk

South Alloa is a small village which lies in the far north of the Falkirk council area of Scotland. The village is on the south bank of the River Forth where the river empties and widens to form the Firth of Forth.

To the west of the village lies the island of Alloa Inch, and directly to the north across the Forth is the town of Alloa, located 0.8 miles (1.3 km) away. Upstream and 5 miles (8.0 km) west-northwest is the city of Stirling and 7.3 miles (11.7 km) south is Falkirk, the principal town of the Falkirk council area. It lies just inside the council boundary line between Falkirk and Stirling councils.

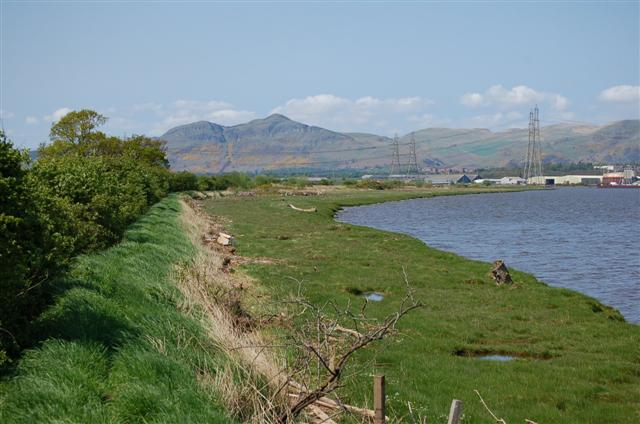
Facing west along the River Forth with South Alloa just visible on the right

The village lies off the A905 road between Dunmore and Throsk. The village is at a former ferry crossing point across the River Forth to Alloa. Between 1850 and 1885 South Alloa railway station was the terminus of a line originally built by Scottish Central Railway.

The village had 112 residents in 2011, a 49% increase since the 2001 census.

== See also ==
- List of places in Falkirk council area
