= Kinbuck railway station =

Disused railway station in Kinbuck, Stirlingshire

Kinbuck

General information
- Location: Kinbuck, Stirlingshire; Scotland
- Coordinates: 56.221°N 3.9476°W
- Grid reference: NN793048
- Platforms: 2

Other information
- Status: Disused

History
- Original company: Scottish Central Railway
- Pre-grouping: Scottish Central Railway; Caledonian Railway
- Post-grouping: London, Midland and Scottish Railway

Key dates
- 22 May 1848: Opened
- 11 June 1956: Closed

Kinbuck railway station served the hamlet of Kinbuck, Stirlingshire, Scotland from 1848 to 1956 on the Scottish Central Railway.

== History ==
The station opened on 22 May 1848 by the Scottish Central Railway. It closed to both passengers and goods traffic on 11 June 1956.

Preceding station	Historical railways	Following station
Greenloaning; Line open, station closed	Scottish Central Railway	Dunblane; Line and station open
