= Frankie Jones (boxer) =

Scottish boxer

Personal information
- Nationality: Scottish
- Born: 12 February 1933 Plean, Scotland
- Died: 1991 (aged 57)
- Weight: fly/bantamweight

Boxing career

Boxing record
- Total fights: 25
- Wins: 17 (KO 5)
- Losses: 8 (KO 5)
- Draws: 0
- No contests: 0

Frankie Jones (12 February 1933 – 1991) born in Plean was a Scottish professional fly/bantamweight boxer of the 1950s and '60s, who won the British Boxing Board of Control (BBBofC) Scottish Area flyweight title, BBBofC British flyweight title, and British Empire flyweight title, his professional fighting weight varied from 109 1/2 lb (49.7 kg; 7 st 11.5 lb), i.e. flyweight to 115 lb (52.2 kg; 8 st 3.0 lb), i.e. bantamweight.

== Genealogical information ==
Frankie Jones had two daughters Jean and Isabel and twin boys Alan and Stewart. He also had a grandson Clifford, and granddaughter Carly, and two great grandchildren Dillon and Leah, the children of Clifford.
