= Bannockburn railway station =

Disused railway station in Bannockburn, Stirlingshire

Coordinates: 56.0921°N 3.9001°W

Bannockburn

General information
- Location: Bannockburn, Stirling; Scotland
- Platforms: 2

Other information
- Status: Disused

History
- Original company: Scottish Central Railway
- Pre-grouping: Scottish Central Railway; Caledonian Railway
- Post-grouping: London, Midland and Scottish Railway

Key dates
- 1 March 1848: Opened
- 2 January 1950: Closed
Location

Bannockburn railway station served the town of Bannockburn, Stirlingshire, Scotland from 1848 to 1950 on the Scottish Central Railway.

== History ==
The station opened on 1 March 1848 by the Scottish Central Railway. The goods yard was to the south, on the east side of the line. Further sidings were added later on as well as the platforms being lengthened. The station closed to both passengers and goods traffic on 2 January 1950.

Preceding station	Historical railways	Following station
Stirling (Scotland); Line and station open	Scottish Central Railway	Plean; Line open, station closed
