= Auchterarder railway station =

Disused railway station in Perthshire, Scotland

Auchterarder
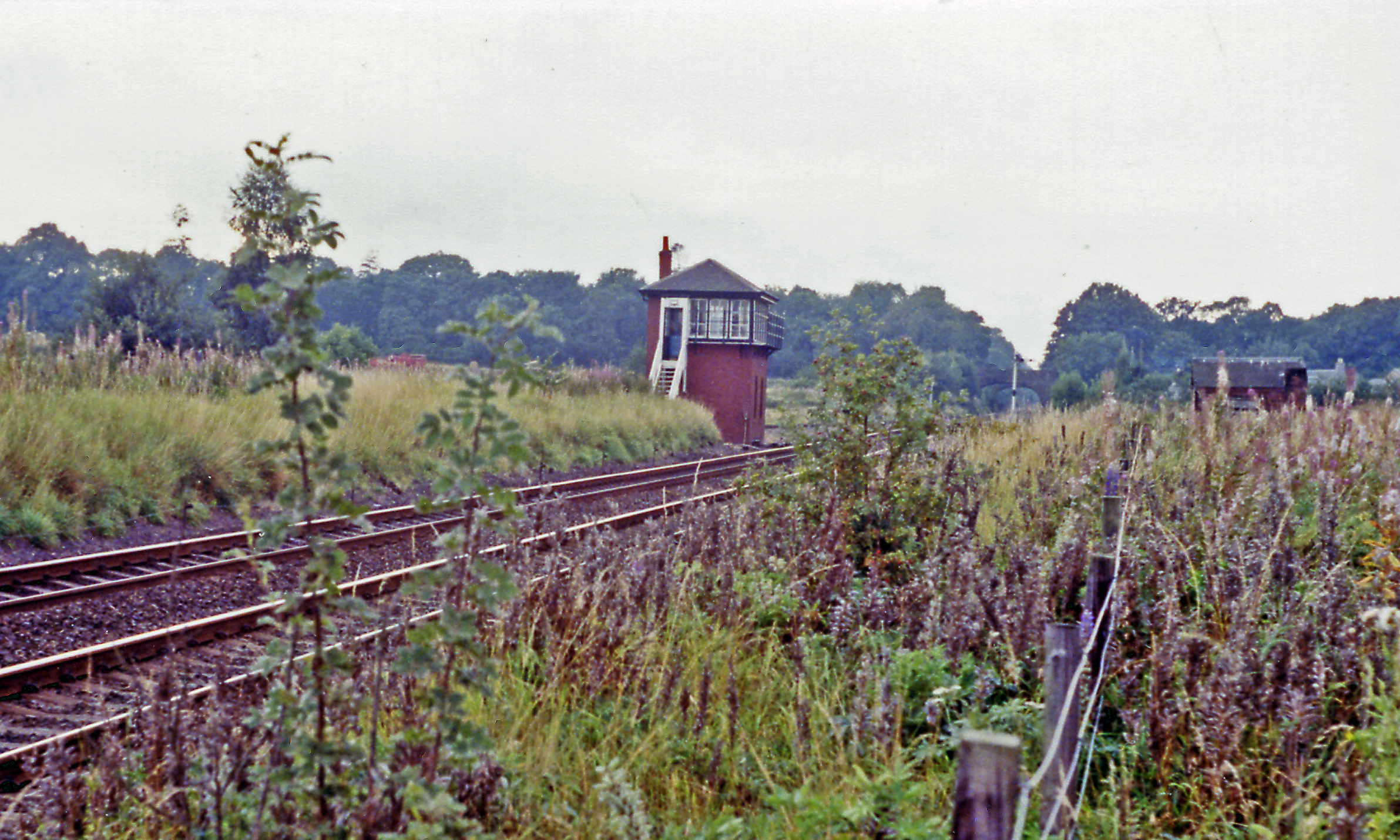
- Site of the station (1991)

General information
- Location: Auchterarder, Perthshire; Scotland
- Coordinates: 56.2902°N 3.6893°W
- Platforms: 2

Other information
- Status: Disused

History
- Original company: Scottish Central Railway
- Pre-grouping: Caledonian Railway
- Post-grouping: London, Midland and Scottish Railway

Key dates
- 22 May 1848: Opened
- 11 June 1956: Closed
Location

Auchterarder railway station served the village of Auchterarder near Gleneagles in the Scottish county of Perth and Kinross.

== History ==
Opened by the Scottish Central Railway, then by the Caledonian Railway, it became part of the London, Midland and Scottish Railway during the Grouping of 1923. Passing on to the Scottish Region of British Railways on nationalisation in 1948, it was then closed by the British Transport Commission in 1956.

Preceding station	Historical railways	Following station
Dunning	Caledonian Railway; Scottish Central Railway	Gleneagles
