= Dunning railway station =

Disused railway station in Dunning, Perth and Kinross

Dunning
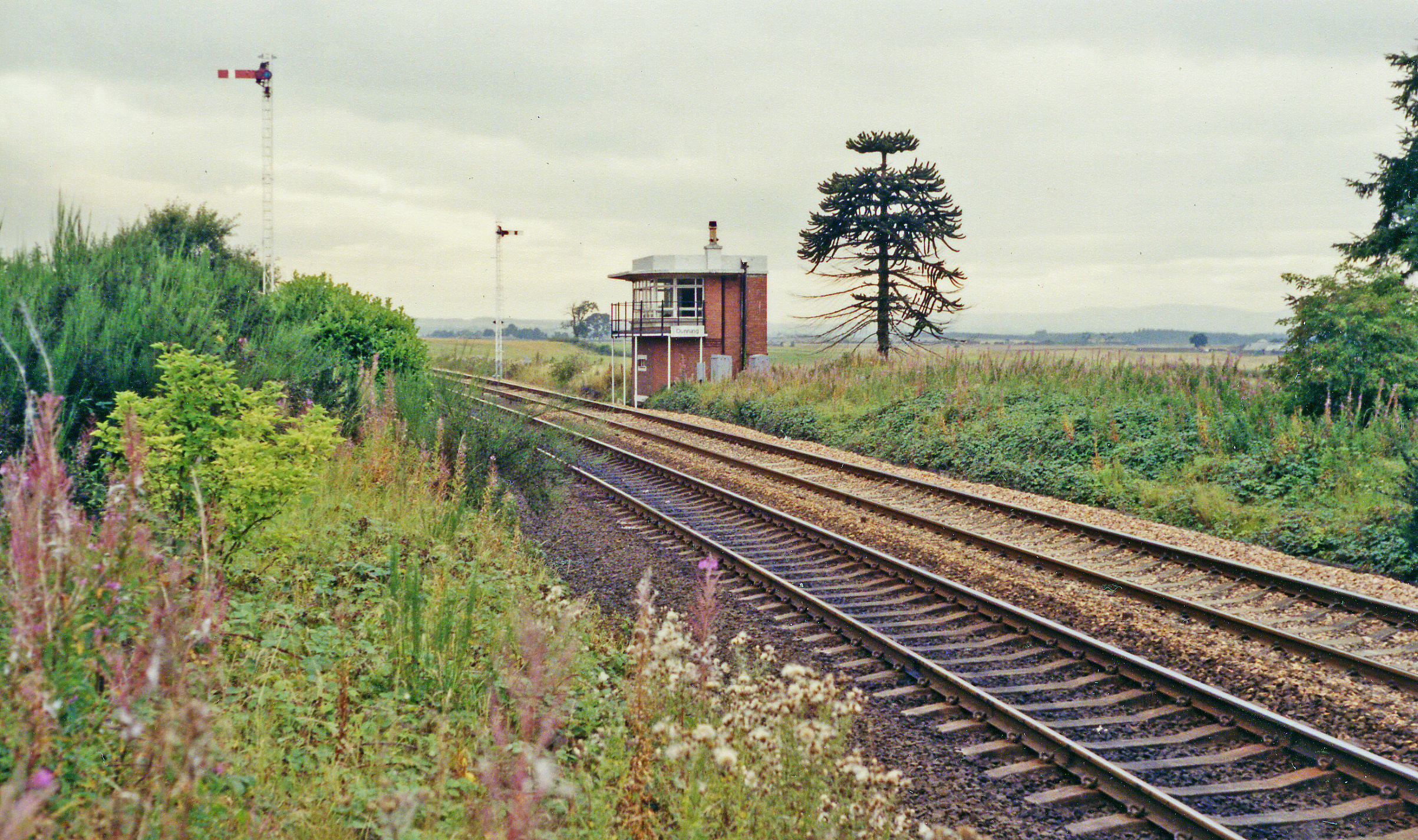
- The site of the station in 1991

General information
- Location: Dunning, Perth and Kinross; Scotland
- Coordinates: 56.3293°N 3.6136°W
- Grid reference: NO003163
- Platforms: 2

Other information
- Status: Disused

History
- Original company: Scottish Central Railway
- Pre-grouping: Caledonian Railway
- Post-grouping: London, Midland and Scottish Railway

Key dates
- 22 May 1848: Opened
- 11 June 1956: Closed
Location

Dunning railway station served the village of Dunning, Perth and Kinross, Scotland from 1848 to 1956 on the Scottish Central Railway.

== History ==
The station was opened on 22 May 1848 by the Scottish Central Railway. The station closed to both passengers and goods traffic on 11 June 1956.

| Preceding station | Historical railways | Following station |
|---|---|---|
| Forteviot; Line open, station closed | Scottish Central Railway | Auchterarder; Line open, station closed |
