= Scottish Central Railway =

Former railway line in Scotland

The Scottish Central Railway (SCR) was formed in 1845 to link Perth and Stirling to Central Scotland, by building a railway line to join the Edinburgh and Glasgow Railway near Castlecary.

The line opened in 1848 including a branch to South Alloa. The line immediately became part of the forming trunk railway network in Scotland, and amalgamation with other railways was considered, and in 1865 the Scottish Central Railway amalgamated with the Caledonian Railway.

The main line continues in use today as a major part of the Scottish Railway network carrying frequent passenger services and a significant freight traffic.

== History ==
=== Conception ===
In earlier years Perth had been an important trading town, but in the 1830s its significance was being overshadowed by the cities of central Scotland. There were short local railways in the area around Dundee, but connection to the emerging network further south, and potentially in England, seemed to be essential, and proposals were put forward from 1841 to achieve that. The opening of the Edinburgh and Glasgow Railway (E&GR) in 1842 emphasised the need, and a railway connection from Perth to join the E&GR was an expedient way to satisfy it. In fact the early objective was to connect at the north end with the Dundee and Newtyle Railway, which had opened in 1831.

A meeting took place on 24 February 1844 to move the matter forward and a prospectus was issued in the following month. By April 1844 there were references to the Central Railway, and E&GR agreement to making a connection was reported; the Caledonian Railway too was becoming a reality, as the prime connection between central Scotland and the English network, and connection to the Caledonian would give that added access.

The Caledonian saw the synergy of a linkage with the Scottish Central and proposed an alliance, offering to pay certain parliamentary and other expenses. The Caledonian policy was aggressive expansion (even though it had not yet obtained authorisation for its first line); the price was that the Scottish Central would permanently ally with the Caledonian and give the Caley primacy as far north as Stirling. The SCR declined the offer.

Scottish Central Railway Act 1845
- Act of Parliament
- Parliament of the United Kingdom
- Long title: An Act for making a Railway from the City of Perth, by Stirling, to the Edinburgh and Glasgow Railway, to be called The Scottish Central Railway.
- Citation: 8 & 9 Vict. c. clxi

Dates
- Royal assent: 31 July 1845

Other legislation
- Repealed by: Scottish Central Railway Consolidation Act 1859

Status: Repealed

Text of statute as originally enacted

Surveys of the route were carried out, and a route selected following the present-day main line from Larbert to Perth, except for the location of the Perth station; and there was to be a branch line to Crieff. The bill for the line went to the 1845 session of Parliament, and the Scottish Central Railway obtained the Scottish Central Railway Act 1845 (8 & 9 Vict. c. clxi) on 31 July 1845. (Note: Marshall in The Scottish Central Railway says 1 July 1845, on pages 25 and 243, quoting cap. 161. This seems to be a mistake; 31 July is given in An Act for making a Railway from the City of Perth, by Stirling, to the Edinburgh and Glasgow Railway, to be called the Scottish Central Railway, cap. cxli, listed in The Statutes of the United Kingdom of Great Britain and Ireland, 8 & 9 Victoriae, 1845, and in Carter, page 97) The engineers for the line were Joseph Locke and John Edward Errington.

=== Negotiations ===
When determining its route, the SCR had assumed friendly terms with the E&GR would give it access to Glasgow over their line; but the E&GR had opposed the Scottish Central Railway Bill in Parliament, having its own designs on reaching Stirling. The newly incorporated SCR therefore negotiated with the Caledonian, also newly incorporated. The Caledonian proposed to enter Glasgow from the south over the Glasgow, Garnkirk and Coatbridge Railway, a renamed and modernised incarnation of the early Garnkirk and Glasgow Railway (G&GR). This ran from Coatbridge in a broad northern sweep to a terminus at Townhead in Glasgow, and the Caledonian was going to lease or buy it. The Caledonian was receptive to the SCR approach, no doubt preferring that the SCR should ally itself with it rather than the hostile E&GR, and offered the SCR the option of joint ownership of the GG&CR. Fearing too close a relationship with the Caledonian, the SCR refused the offer. For the time being it had no assured route to Glasgow.

Interest had arisen in a line serving Callander, branching from the Scottish Central. This later became titled the Dunblane, Doune and Callander Railway but at this early stage its committee asked the SCR for support. A feeder branch was welcome, but they wanted cash. Fearing that rejection would drive the Callander line into hostile hands the SCR undertook to take a substantial shareholding.

The authorised capital of the SCR had been £700,000, but it was now considered necessary to increase this to £850,000 by a share issue (Note: What is nowadays referred to as a rights issue.) to cover the cost of a branch to Falkirk on the E&GR, which had evidently not been considered necessary before.

In September 1845 a frenzied series of negotiations took place with the Caledonian and the E&GR about access; these did not lead directly to an agreement, but in October 1845 the board agreed on amalgamation with the E&GR "on equal terms"; the Caledonian were informed, and in November the SCR announced to them that they planned to merge with or lease the Scottish Midland Junction Railway. This was bad news for the Caledonian, which had planned to form close links with the SCR and the SMJR, forming a "West Coast alliance". There had already been a non-encroachment agreement by which neither company would promote new lines into the other's natural area of influence, but as time went by this was not well adhered to.

The junction with the Edinburgh and Glasgow Railway at Greenhill gave satisfactory access for Scottish Central trains to Glasgow Queen Street, but was inconvenient for Edinburgh. In the 1846 parliamentary session, the E&GR submitted a bill for the Stirlingshire Midland Junction Railway, which was to build from Polmont to a junction near Larbert, giving a direct connection. The Stirlingshire Midland Junction Railway Act 1846 (9 & 10 Vict. c. clxv) was passed on 16 June 1846. It was a creature of the Edinburgh and Glasgow Railway and was absorbed by the E&GR before completion of construction in 1850. The E&GR gave the SCR accommodation at Sighthill, near Glasgow, for its goods traffic.

Scottish Central Railway (Crieff Branch) Act 1846
- Act of Parliament
- Parliament of the United Kingdom
- Long title: An Act to enable the Scottish Central Railway Company to make a Branch Railway to Crieff in the County of Perth.
- Citation: 9 & 10 Vict. c. cxci

Dates
- Royal assent: 16 July 1846

Other legislation
- Repealed by: Scottish Central Railway Consolidation Act 1859

Status: Repealed

Scottish Central Railway (Denny Branch) Act 1846
- Act of Parliament
- Parliament of the United Kingdom
- Long title: An Act to enable the Scottish Central Railway Company to make a Branch Railway to Denny in the County of Stirling.
- Citation: 9 & 10 Vict. c. clxxx

Dates
- Royal assent: 16 July 1846

Other legislation
- Repealed by: Scottish Central Railway Consolidation Act 1859

Status: Repealed

Scottish Central Railway (Alloa Branch) Act 1846
- Act of Parliament
- Parliament of the United Kingdom
- Long title: An Act to enable the Scottish Central Railway Company to make a Branch Railway by Alloa Ferry to Tillicoultry.
- Citation: 9 & 10 Vict. c. cl

Dates
- Royal assent: 16 July 1846

Other legislation
- Repealed by: Scottish Central Railway Consolidation Act 1859

Status: Repealed

Scottish Central Railway (Perth Termini and Stations) Act 1846
- Act of Parliament
- Parliament of the United Kingdom
- Long title: An Act to enable the Scottish Central Railway Company to make certain Terminal Branches and other Works at the City of Perth.
- Citation: 9 & 10 Vict. c. clxxxix

Dates
- Royal assent: 16 July 1846

Other legislation
- Repealed by: Scottish Central Railway Consolidation Act 1859

Status: Repealed

In the 1846 session of Parliament, several SCR branches were authorised by acts of Parliament: the Scottish Central Railway (Crieff Branch) Act 1846 (9 & 10 Vict. c. cxci) for a branch to Crieff from what was later Gleneagles (capital £160,000); the Scottish Central Railway (Denny Branch) Act 1846 (9 & 10 Vict. c. clxxx) for a branch to Denny from Larbert (capital £50,000); the Scottish Central Railway (Alloa Branch) Act 1846 (9 & 10 Vict. c. cl) for a branch to South Alloa from a junction north of Larbert (and to Tillicoultry by ferry at Alloa, capital £115,000); and the Scottish Central Railway (Perth Termini and Stations) Act 1846 (9 & 10 Vict. c. clxxxix) for a branch to Perth Harbour and other facilities there (capital £80,000). The location of the Perth main station was also finalised; earlier proposals to site it (and three other railways' terminus stations) at the high-amenity South Inch had led to strenuous opposition in Perth; now it would be located to the west. However one important bill failed: the amalgamation with the E&GR required parliamentary approval and this was withheld on 29 July 1847.

While construction of the line was proceeding, the board considered how they could best get access to Glasgow and Edinburgh, and amalgamation with the Caledonian Railway now seemed to be the way forward. The London and North Western Railway (LNWR) and the Lancaster and Carlisle Railway were joining with the Caledonian in arguing the case: the future West Coast alliance was forming after all. The SCR shareholders would receive 7% on their capital. This drew strong opposition from the Edinburgh and Glasgow Railway, which had assumed a working arrangement would be possible, and they threatened opposition in Parliament; and indeed in June 1848 a bill to authorise leasing the Scottish Central line to the Caledonian was rejected. The Scottish Central had promised the Caledonian a loan of £6,000 towards their building of a branch to Castlecary, to join the Scottish Central there. The offer was now withdrawn.

The Scottish Central had finalised an agreement to work the Scottish Midland Junction Railway (SMJR), which had been authorised on the same day as the Scottish Central; it was to run from Perth to Forfar, connecting with a line to Aberdeen. As it was expected to open later in 1848 there was a sudden burst of activity to acquire the rolling stock necessary to work that line. This was at a time when final payments to the SCR's own construction contractors were becoming due, and finding the cash was for a while a significant problem.

=== Construction and openings ===
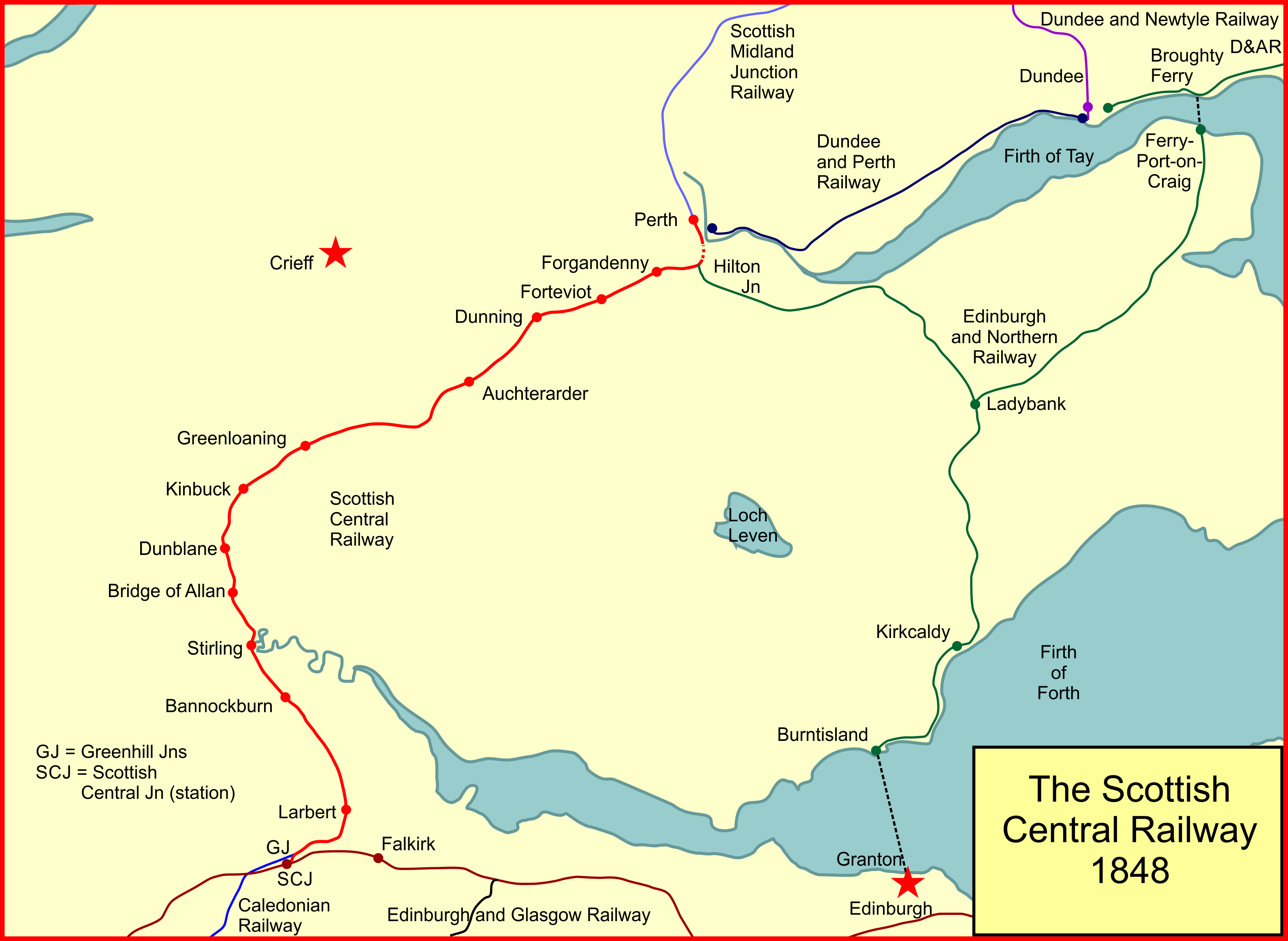
System map of the Scottish Central Railway in 1848

The building of the line took longer than the board had hoped; it had once been promised for April 1847. A combination of landowners delaying the release of their line, a series of hard winters, and difficulties in tunnel construction combined. In 1848 Captain Wynne of the Board of Trade made an inspection on 5 January 1848; he found the line not quite ready but after a second inspection it was indicated that the line could be opened from Stirling to the southern end, that is the junction at Greenhill with the Edinburgh and Glasgow. The opening took place on 1 March 1848; the shareholders had voted against Sunday operation.

The northern section of the main line was ready in May and a ceremonial opening took place on 15 May 1848; the public opening was made on 22 May 1848. The intermediate stations were incomplete and goods facilities were not initially available, so that at this stage the line was open for passengers only, until 15 June 1848. The Perth General station was a considerable structure, having been designed by William Tite; the Scottish Central had been in the lead for design and construction, but the Edinburgh and Northern Railway and the Dundee and Perth Railway were given accommodation at the station. The permanent building was not ready for the opening of the line and a temporary platform was provided.

The Caledonian Railway opened its connection at Greenhill on 7 August 1848, connecting London with Perth, and beyond. A fourteen-hour journey was advertised. Cattle could be conveyed to market in London in 24 hours where previously they had gone to London on the hoof, taking several weeks. The Dundee and Perth Railway was already open, and the Scottish Midland Junction Railway, open from 20 August 1848 and associated lines gave access through to Forfar. The SCR trains to Glasgow continued to run to Queen Street over the Edinburgh and Glasgow Railway.

The South Alloa branch opened on 12 September 1848, from a junction at Plean.

The Dundee and Perth changed its name to the Dundee and Perth and Aberdeen Railway Junction Company and opened its wooden bridge (replaced by today's Tay Viaduct) crossing the Tay at Perth on 8 March 1849.

=== Financial difficulties ===
Having lost the amalgamation bills, the SCR considered what arrangements to make. In February 1849 it was reported that an arrangement had been finalised with the "Southern Companies", meaning the Caledonian and the LNWR and the Lancaster and Carlisle; they would work the SCR and the SCR handed over their rolling stock to them. The SCR would receive 6% on its capital as well as a contribution to its expenses. If this seemed like a good idea, it was soon proven otherwise. The Caledonian Railway had pursued an aggressive policy of capturing territory by leasing local railways. This avoided a large initial payment, but committed the Caledonian to massive periodical payments. The Caledonian was soon overwhelmed by this, and in the summer of 1849 asked the LNWR to take over the running of its line. The LNWR, seeing the situation, refused. The contractor Thomas Brassey was approached, with the same outcome.

Through the course of 1849 the Caledonian found that the income on the SCR (and also the Scottish Midland Junction, which the SCR had leased) barely covered operating expenses, and the promised 6% on capital was not remitted. The LNWR and the Lancaster and Carlisle declined to remit money while the prime player, the Caledonian, was not doing so. On 1 December 1850 the SCR reclaimed its rolling stock from the Caledonian in order operate its trains and those of the Scottish Midland Junction; this included working into Queen Street station in Glasgow. In January 1851 the outstanding sums had become huge and the SCR took the Caledonian to court over the outstanding, which had reached £900,000. The court ruled against the SCR on the basis that the working agreement had not been ratified by Parliament and was ultra vires.

The SCR was still dependent on the Southern companies for through traffic. (Note: Marshall says that the relationship "was not entirely acrimonious"!) A period of relative stability now followed, and an arrangement for sharing the receipts from traffic damped down competitive aggression for a decade.

=== Tolls in Moncrieffe Tunnel ===
The SCR was entitled to charge a toll for the trains of other lines over their own route on a mileage basis; but the passage of Moncrieffe Tunnel, between Perth and Hilton Junction (where the Edinburgh and Northern line diverged) was counted as four miles. This heavy extra charge was resented by the other companies, and in January 1851 the SCR substantially raised the charges and extended them to other categories (such as accompanied dogs) causing extreme antagonism. In fact some companies in particular the E&GR refused to pay for a period; during this time the SCR stopped their trains just before entering the tunnel and insisted on taking the tunnel charge in cash from passengers in the trains. The matter shortly came to a head and a more moderate annualised charge was agreed. A corresponding difficulty existed with the toll for the use of Perth station and its approach tracks, and this led to similar controversy in 1849 (see below).

=== The Forth and Clyde Junction ===
In 1856 the Forth and Clyde Junction Railway (F&CJR) opened, running west from Stirling to Balloch. The Scottish Central provided engines and crews although the F&CJR line worked its line itself in other respects. The F&CJR felt that the SCR was overcharging for its services and announced their intention to terminate the arrangement from 7 February 1860. They needed to order locomotives and they were delivered in 1861, from which time the F&CJR was robustly independent.

=== The Dundee and Perth joins the SCR ===
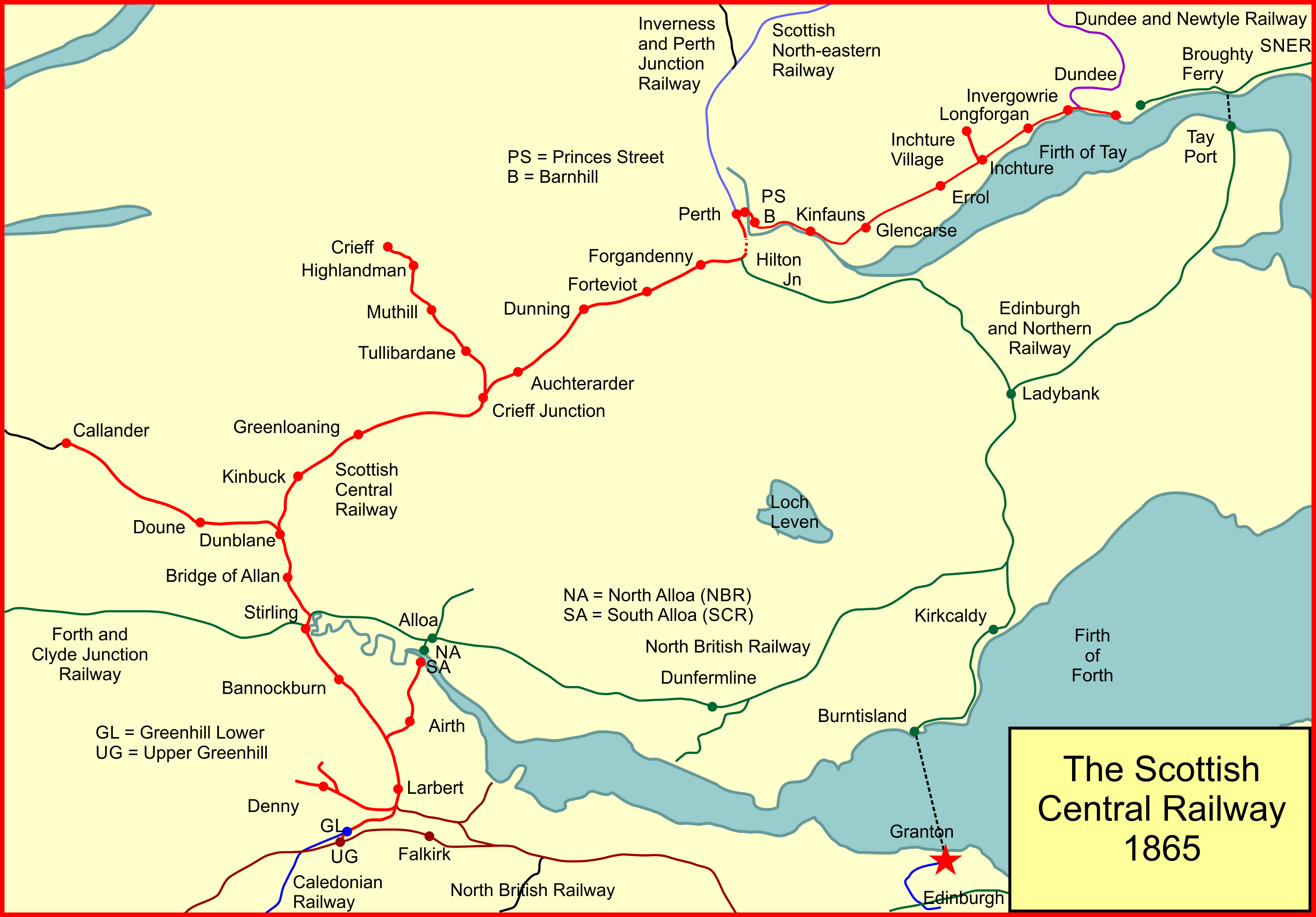
System map of the Scottish Central Railway in 1865

The SCR had long had designs on Dundee, and early on had acquired a ferry operation across the Tay there. In fact the Dundee and Perth Railway connected the two places, crossing the Tay at Perth and using the same Perth station as the SCR. Amalgamation was considered beneficial, and on 26 July 1863 it was ratified by the Scottish Central Railway (Dundee, Perth and Aberdeen Railway Purchase) Act 1863 (26 & 27 Vict. c. ccxxiii).

=== Crieff ===
A branch line to Crieff had been included in the original Scottish Central Railway Act 1845, but the company did not press forward with this line due to shortage of capital. A separate company, the Crieff Junction Railway was authorised by the Crieff Junction Railway Act 1853 (16 & 17 Vict. c. clxxxviii) on 15 August 1853. The engineer for the construction was Thomas Bouch, but he had many commitments at the time, and his absences led to considerable delay in completion of the line. It finally opened on 14 March 1856 after an incident in which the SCR refused to allow its locomotive to traverse points at the junction on the intended day (13 March) because they said they were unsafe. The junction station was only an interchange station.

=== Perth harbour ===
The Scottish Central Railway Act 1845 had included a branch to Perth Harbour, at Friarton. This was not merely a permission, but an obligation. Perth magistrates were anxious that the branch should be built, as they believed their burgh was losing out to Dundee because of the inconvenient transport links. The act had required the SCR to build the branch by 1 July 1851. The SCR was especially short of funds at this time and stalled, but the matter was taken to legal opinion in London, and the SCR felt compelled to build the line; it opened in 1852.

=== Perth station ===
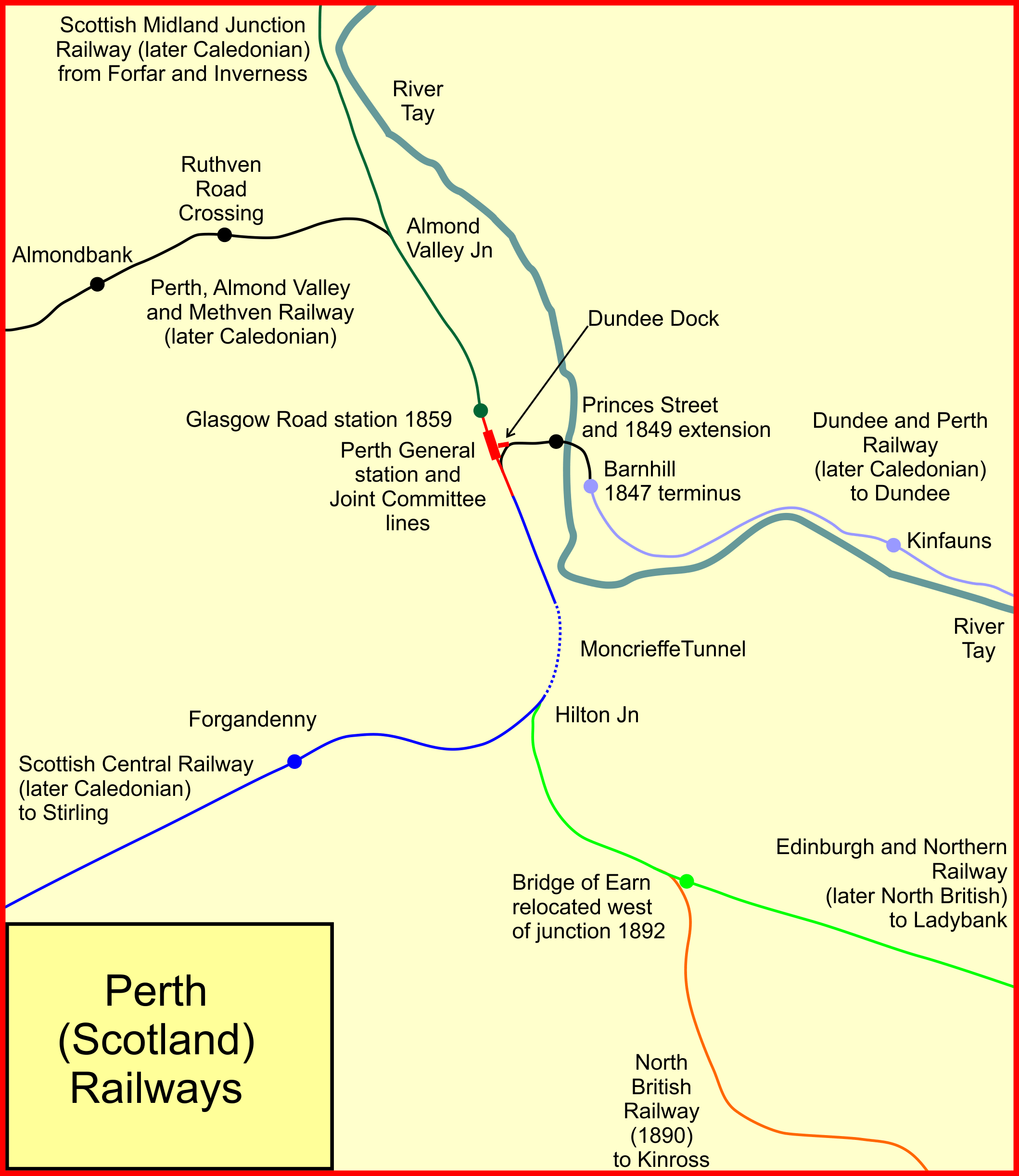
The railway network in Perth

Perth General station took a long time to be completed: the initial; stage was substantially complete in early 1849. The Scottish Central had taken the lead in the design and construction, and controlled the operation of the station.

Many amalgamations and name changes took place at this period. The other "founding" users of the station were

- the Scottish Midland Junction Railway; in 1846 it extended and changed its name to the Scottish North Eastern Railway (SNER); the line ran north from Perth to Forfar and Aberdeen;
- the Dundee and Perth Railway (D&PR); in 1848 it extended and changed its name to the Dundee and Perth and Aberdeen Railway Junction Company; it ran east to Dundee, and then north to Arbroath and Aberdeen;
- the Edinburgh and Northern Railway; in 1847 it extended and changed its name to the Edinburgh, Perth and Dundee Railway (EP&DR); it approached Perth from the south-east via Ladybank; Dundee, referred to in the name, was reached from Ladybank; in 1862 the company was absorbed by the North British Railway.

With the operating arrangements of the day, dealing with the trains of four companies proved a challenge. This was increased when the Perth and Dunkeld Railway opened in 1856, running to Perth over the SNER.

Scottish Central Railway Consolidation Act 1859
- Act of Parliament
- Parliament of the United Kingdom
- Long title: An Act to consolidate and amend the Acts relating to the Scottish Central Railway.
- Citation: 22 & 23 Vict. c. lxxxiii

Dates
- Royal assent: 8 August 1859

On 8 August 1859 the station was, by the Scottish Central Railway Consolidation Act 1859 (22 & 23 Vict. c. lxxxiii) transferred to joint status. However the ownership of the approach lines was with the SCR and the SNER was charged the equivalent of six miles running for the use of 320 yards of line on the northern approach. The SNER refused this in 1859 and set up a temporary platform just beyond the SCR lines; the station was called Glasgow Road. Through passengers had to make their own way through the streets between the two stations. The dispute lasted a few weeks until an arbitrator allowed the SNER to use the tracks for an annual payment of £100.

At this period the Dundee and Perth trains were arriving to the south of the station and reversing into it. In 1861 separate platforms outside the main station and at right angles to it, were opened; they were referred to as the Dundee Dock. Through goods trains to the north were diverted to tracks on the west side of the station itself, but there were still complaints about congestion.

In 1861 the Inverness and Perth Junction Railway was authorised, and it made initial approaches to the joint committee about the use of Perth station. When the Inverness line opened in 1863, the major issue was the stabling of its carriages: the SCR insisted that there was no room within the station for the purpose.

Perth General Station Act 1865
- Act of Parliament
- Parliament of the United Kingdom
- Long title: An Act to incorporate the Committee for managing the General Station at Perth, and to vest in such Committee the whole of that Station and other Works to be made Part thereof; to alter the Division and Appropriation thereof; to authorize the Enlargement and Improvement of that Station and the Construction of new Works; to enable the Committee to recover the Expense of Enlargement from the Companies interested in such Station, and to confer Powers and impose Liabilities on those Companies; and for other Purposes.
- Citation: 28 & 29 Vict. c. cclii

Dates
- Royal assent: 5 July 1865

Text of statute as originally enacted

In December 1865 the company prepared a bill to extend Perth station. Immediately the joint station committee declared that it was its prerogative to do so, and they prepared a similar, but not identical, proposal. Their version became law as the Perth General Station Act 1865 (28 & 29 Vict. c. cclii) on 1 August 1865, also formalising the status of the joint committee in the light of the railway amalgamations that had taken place.

=== Absorbing the Callander line ===
The Dunblane, Doune and Callander Railway had been supported financially by the Scottish Central, to the extent of £200,000 and worked by it. (Note: Ross questions why the SCR made this financial contribution: "Why should the Scottish Central do this? It was a curious action for a company which had seemed more interested in selling itself than in making major capital investments in new and distinctly speculative railways". (Page 87.)) By the Scottish Central and Dunblane, Doune and Callander Railways Amalgamation Act 1865 (28 & 29 Vict. c. cxxxiii) of 29 June 1865, the Callander company was absorbed by the Scottish Central. The combined company did not remain in independent existence very long: the Callander company was absorbed by the SCR on 31 July 1865. That change lasted one day.

=== The Denny lines ===
Scottish Central Railway (Denny Branches) Act 1856
- Act of Parliament
- Parliament of the United Kingdom
- Long title: An Act to enable the Scottish Central Railway Company to make Branch Railways to the Town of Denny in the County of Stirling.
- Citation: 19 & 20 Vict. c. cxxxix

Dates
- Royal assent: 29 July 1856

Other legislation
- Repealed by: Scottish Central Railway Consolidation Act 1859

Status: Repealed

Text of statute as originally enacted

The original Scottish Central Railway main line was projected at one time to have been taken through Denny, but this was not done. A branch was authorised by the Scottish Central Railway (Denny Branches) Act 1856 (19 & 20 Vict. c. cxxxix), from the junctions at Carmuirs; it opened on 1 April 1858, after some delay due to the Inspecting Officer's reservations about some details. The line was three miles (5 km) long, without any intermediate station.

Scottish Central Railway (Denny Branch Extensions) Act 1857
- Act of Parliament
- Parliament of the United Kingdom
- Long title: An Act to enable the Scottish Central Railway Company to make and maintain certain Extensions of their Denny Branch.
- Citation: 20 & 21 Vict. c. lxxxi

Dates
- Royal assent: 27 July 1857

Other legislation
- Repealed by: Scottish Central Railway Consolidation Act 1859

Status: Repealed

Text of statute as originally enacted

The branch was extended for goods only by the Scottish Central Railway (Denny Branch Extensions) Act 1857 (20 & 21 Vict. c. lxxxi), opening in January 1860; called the "Denny Branch Extension" it ran to Stoneywood, and there were mineral branches also to ironstone pits near Ingleston.

In 1888, after absorption by the Caledonian Railway, a further extension south-west from Stoneywood was built; known as the Castlerankine branch, it ran to Carronrigg Colliery.

=== Amalgamation with the Caledonian Railway ===
Caledonian and Scottish Central Railways Amalgamation Act 1865
- Act of Parliament
- Parliament of the United Kingdom
- Long title: An Act for the Amalgamation of the Scottish Central Railway Company with the Caledonian Railway Company; and for other Purposes.
- Citation: 28 & 29 Vict. c. cclxxxvii

Dates
- Royal assent: 5 July 1865

Text of statute as originally enacted

The Edinburgh and Glasgow formed an increasingly close alliance with the North British Railway, and it was clear that this would result in polarisation into an East Coast group; the obvious consequence was closer alliance between the SCR and the Caledonian, and amalgamation was seriously discussed: it resulted in formal amalgamation by an act of Parliament, the Caledonian and Scottish Central Railways Amalgamation Act 1865 (28 & 29 Vict. c. cclxxxvii), on 5 July 1865, taking effect on 1 August 1865. The Scottish Central Railway ceased to exist, except to wind up the company.

The operation of SCR trains to Glasgow into Queen Street over the E&GR continued: it had done so even during the period when the Caledonian was working the SCR. However this changed from 1 January 1870, by which time the Caledonian had enlarged its Buchanan Street terminal in Glasgow, and SCR trains now ran to that station.

== Incidents ==
On 2 September 1848 a Scottish Central Railway coach attached to a LNWR express train from Stratford to Birmingham was involved in, and may have been a contributory cause of, a fatal derailment near Newton Road railway station.

== Under the Caledonian Railway ==
Thus the Caledonian Railway acquired 112 route miles of line:

- the Scottish Central Main Line, double track;
- the Dundee and Perth lines double track;
- the Dundee and Newtyle line, which had been leased to the Dundee and Perth in 1846;
- the Dunblane, Doune and Callander line;
- the South Alloa branch;
- the Crieff branch;
- the Denny branch; and
- short branches at Plean.

=== Perth station ===
The Perth station was once again considerably enlarged. The joint committee now consisted of the Caledonian Railway, the North British Railway and the Highland Railway. In 1884 the Perth station was again much extended; the Dundee Dock, which consisted of terminal platforms at right angles to the main station, was converted into two sharply curved through platforms connected directly to the main station.

=== Crossing the Forth at Alloa ===
As early as 1846 the Scottish Central Railway board had determined to build a line to Tillicoultry, crossing the Forth at Alloa. This ambitious idea fell by the wayside but the Scottish Central Railway did build a branch to South Alloa on the south bank of the Forth where a ferry operated to Alloa on the north bank.

The branch was opened on 2 September 1850, from a new station Alloa Junction (located between Larbert and Plean) to Alloa.

In July 1852 the SCR operated the ferry crossing, advertising the journey to Glasgow and Edinburgh as taking 2 and 2½ hours.

The ferry remained open but with different lessees, for example the lease was re-let in 1861 when the local newspaper hoped to see an improved vessel put into service that could accommodate carts and carriages.

The Caledonian Railway was still using the ferry and South Alloa station in early 1885 advertising services to Glasgow (Buchanan Street) and Edinburgh Waverley. South Alloa station was closed on 1 October 1885 when the Caledonian Railway opened a new line, the Alloa Railway to Alloa from the south using a swing bridge to cross the Forth.

=== Moncrieffe tunnel ===
Moncrieffe Tunnel lay south of Perth station and between November 1901 and late 1903 it was lined with bricks, having originally been left unlined. One running line was removed and single-line working operated through the tunnel during the course of the work.

=== Passenger train services ===
Perth station was the focus of several railways and as traffic developed at the end of the nineteenth century and in the twentieth century, the working became very complex. Many of the most important express trains loaded very heavily and conveyed multiple though coaches. In many cases these were remarshalled at Perth, with the through coaches being transferred between trains or stood to one side to await a later onward service.

Between 1962 and 1966 the three-hour expresses between Glasgow and Aberdeen were operated by former London and North Eastern Railway (LNER) A4 Pacific locomotives. These had been displaced from their work on the East Coast Main Line by the process of dieselisation, and did good work on the Aberdeen trains.

== Topography ==
Main line: opened Perth to Stirling 23 May 1848, Stirling to Greenhill 1 March 1848; local stations closed 11 June 1956:

- Perth; from time to time known as Perth General; the permanent station replaced the original temporary station on 2 August 1848;
- Moncrieffe Tunnel;
- Hilton Junction; facing junction to Ladybank line;
- Forgandenny;
- Forteviot;
- Dunning;
- Auchterarder;
- Crieff Junction; opened 14 March 1856; trailing junction from Crieff; renamed Gleneagles 1912; (still open);
- Blackford;
- Carsbreck; used occasionally between 1853 and 1935 for Caledonian Curling Club meetings; sometimes known as Curling Pond or Carsbreck Club;
- Greenloaning;
- Kinbuck;
- Dunblane;
- Bridge of Allan; closed 1 November 1965; reopened 13 May 1985;
- Stirling; trailing junction from Balloch; trailing junction from Alloa NBR;
- Bannockburn; closed 2 January 1950;
- Plean; opened 1 March 1904; closed 11 June 1956:
- Alloa Junction; opened 2 September 1850; closed November 1865; trailing junction from South Alloa;
- Larbert;
- Larbert Junction; facing junction to Denny and to Stirlingshire Midland Junction line to Falkirk;
- Carmuirs West Junction; trailing junction from Denny and from Falkirk Grahamston;
- Greenhill; closed 18 April 1966; station also known as Greenhill Lower;
- Greenhill Upper Junction; facing junction to Caledonian line to Cumbernauld;
- Greenhill Upper Junction; trailing junction into Edinburgh and Glasgow line.

Denny Branch.

- Larbert Junction and Carmuirs South Junction (above);
- junction;
- Denny; opened 26 March 1858; closed 28 July 1930.

South Alloa Branch

Opened 2 September 1850; closed to passengers from Dunmore Junction to South Alloa on 1 October 1885; closed to goods from Dunmore Junction to South Alloa on 1 September 1950.

- North Alloa; ferry station only, not rail connected; closed 1885;
- River Forth Ferry;
- South Alloa; opened as Alloa on 2 September 1850: renamed South Alloa in 1854; closed on 1 October 1885; also known as Alloa South;
- Dunnmore Junction; bridge route converges;
- Airth; opened as Carnock Road in July 1852; renamed as Airth Road 1865; renamed as Airth in 1866; closed on 20 September 1954;
- Alloa Junction; opened on 2 September 1850; closed in 1865; trailing junction towards Larbert.

Alloa Bridge line

Opened 1 October 1885; closed to passengers 29 January 1968 and to goods traffic May 1978. The Alloa bridge was closed temporarily following ship damage in 1904 – 1905 and 1920 – 1921.

- Alloa North British Station;
- Longcarse Junction; connection to Caledonian Railway station;
- Alloa Bridge;
- Throsk opened December 1890; closed 18 April 1966;
- Dunmore Junction; above.

== Current operations ==
In 2015 the former SCR main line between Greenhill Junctions and Perth was opened to traffic. Passenger trains are operated by ScotRail, with a limited number of London to Inverness trains operated by London North Eastern Railway. The Perth to Dundee line also continues to be served by ScotRail. All the other original Scottish Central lines have closed.

== Notes ==
=== Sources ===
- Awdry, Christopher (1990). Encyclopaedia of British Railway Companies. Sparkford: Patrick Stephens Ltd. ISBN 1-8526-0049-7. OCLC 19514063. CN 8983.
- Butt, R. V. J. (October 1995). The Directory of Railway Stations: details every public and private passenger station, halt, platform and stopping place, past and present (1st ed.). Sparkford: Patrick Stephens Ltd. ISBN 978-1-85260-508-7. OCLC 60251199. OL 11956311M.
- Helps, Arthur (2006) [1872]. The Life and Works of Mr Brassey (Modern ed.). Stroud: Nonsuch. ISBN 1-8458-8011-0.
- Jowett, Alan (March 1989). Jowett's Railway Atlas of Great Britain and Ireland: From Pre-Grouping to the Present Day (1st ed.). Sparkford: Patrick Stephens Ltd. ISBN 978-1-85260-086-0. OCLC 22311137.
- Marshall, Peter (1998). The Scottish Central Railway: Perth to Stirling. Usk, Monmouthshire: Oakwood Press. ISBN 0-8536-1522-5.
- Quick, Michael (2022) [2001]. Railway passenger stations in Great Britain: a chronology (PDF). version 5.04. Railway & Canal Historical Society. Archived from the original (PDF) on 25 November 2022.
- Thomas, John; Paterson, Rev A. J. S. (1984). A Regional History of the Railways of Great Britain. Vol. VI Scotland: The Lowlands and the Borders (2nd ed.). Newton Abbott, Devon: David & Charles. ISBN 0-9465-3712-7. OCLC 12521072.
