= Dunblane railway station =

Railway station in Stirling, Scotland

Dunblane Scottish Gaelic: Dùn Bhlàthain
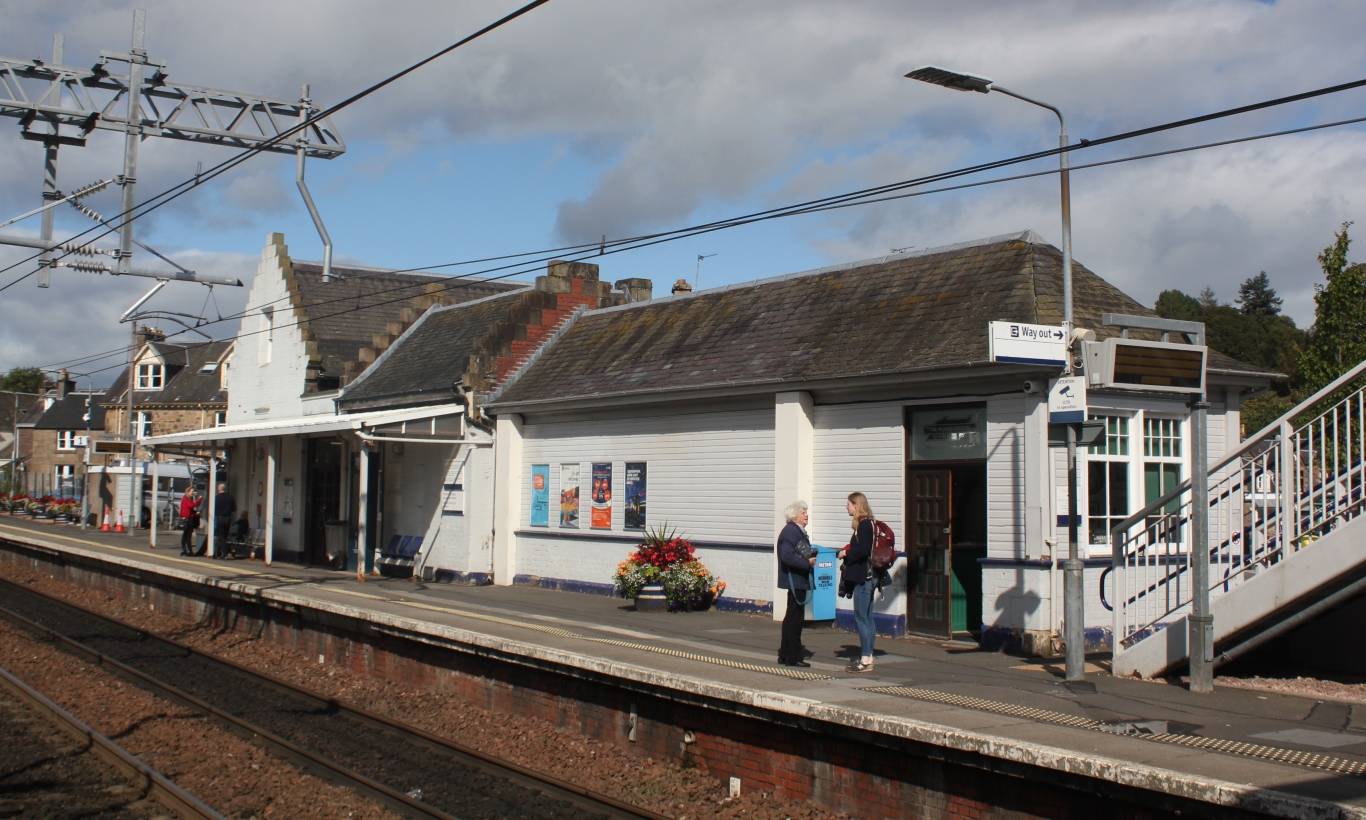

General information
- Location: Dunblane, Stirling, Scotland
- Coordinates: 56.1857°N 3.9657°W
- Grid reference: NN780009
- Manager: ScotRail
- Platforms: 3

Other information
- Station code: DBL

History
- Original company: Scottish Central Railway and Dunblane, Doune and Callander Railway
- Pre-grouping: Caledonian Railway
- Post-grouping: LMSR

Key dates
- 22 May 1848: Opened

Passengers
- 2020/21: ▼73,714
- 2021/22: ▲0.268 million
- 2022/23: ▲0.360 million
- 2023/24: ▲0.463 million
- 2024/25: ▼0.451 million

Listed Building – Category C(S)
- Designated: 17 October 2002
- Reference no.: LB48964
Location
Notes
- Passenger statistics from the Office of Rail and Road

Dunblane railway station serves the town of Dunblane, in central Scotland. It is a stop on the former Scottish Central Railway, between Stirling and Perth, and opened with the line in 1848. It is the northernmost station on the National Rail network to be electrified.

== History ==
Dunblane used to be a junction where the present line and the Dunblane, Doune and Callander Railway diverged. This connected at Callander to the Callander and Oban Railway. The line was closed as part of the Beeching cuts, with the Dunblane–Callander section formally closing on 1 November 1965. Traffic beyond Callander had ended earlier, after a landslide in Glen Ogle on 27 September 1965.

Parts of the trackbed from near Dunblane to Doune and from Callander to Killin are now cycle paths.

A short section of track remains on the branch; it is used for storing track maintenance machines and diesel multiple units.

== Facilities ==
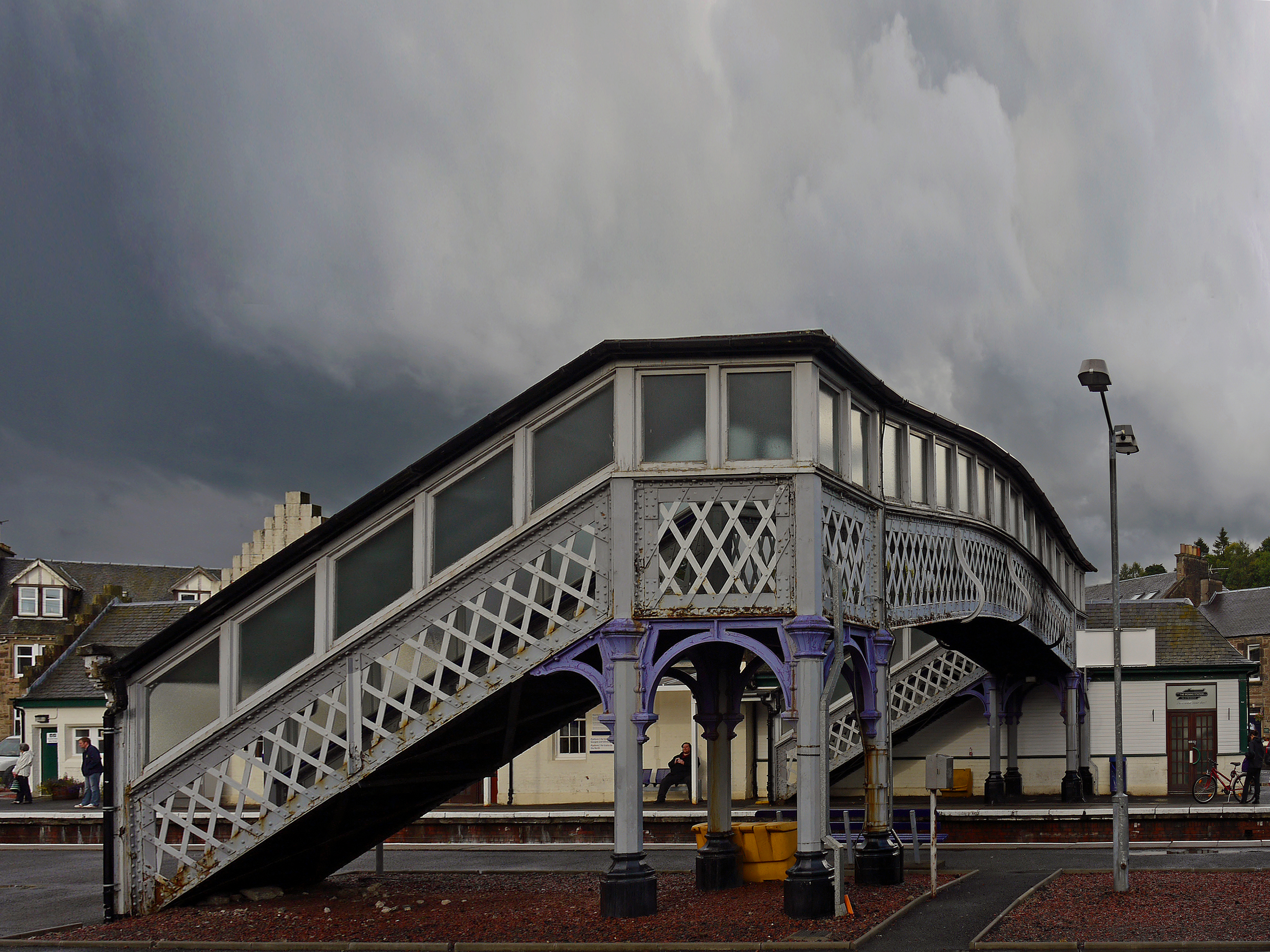
The old footbridge, which was replaced in 2014

The station has three platforms:

1. a terminus for trains from/to Glasgow Queen Street and Edinburgh Waverley
2. trains heading north to Perth, Dundee, Aberdeen and Inverness
3. trains heading south to Glasgow and Edinburgh. These include those that terminate at Dunblane, which travel up the northbound line to the signal box to reverse and cross over to the southbound track before heading back down to the station.

The signal box now operates only the points and signals here. As part of the now completed electrification, the semaphore signals formerly operated by the signal box within the sections electrified (i.e. not to the north of the station) have been replaced with single aspect electrical signals.

The station has the following facilities:

- Passenger information system
- Automatic ticket machine (on platform 1)
- Ticket office and waiting room (Monday-Saturday mornings)
- CCTV
- Waiting shelters and benches
- Limited car parking
- Parking to the west in the former goods sidings area, in conjunction with Tesco supermarket parking
- Help point.

In September 2014, a new footbridge opened with improved accessibility, and the original footbridge removed. The listed footbridge was re-erected at the heritage Bridge of Dun railway station.

Several plants have been placed around the station by a voluntary group known as Dunblane in Bloom.

== Services ==
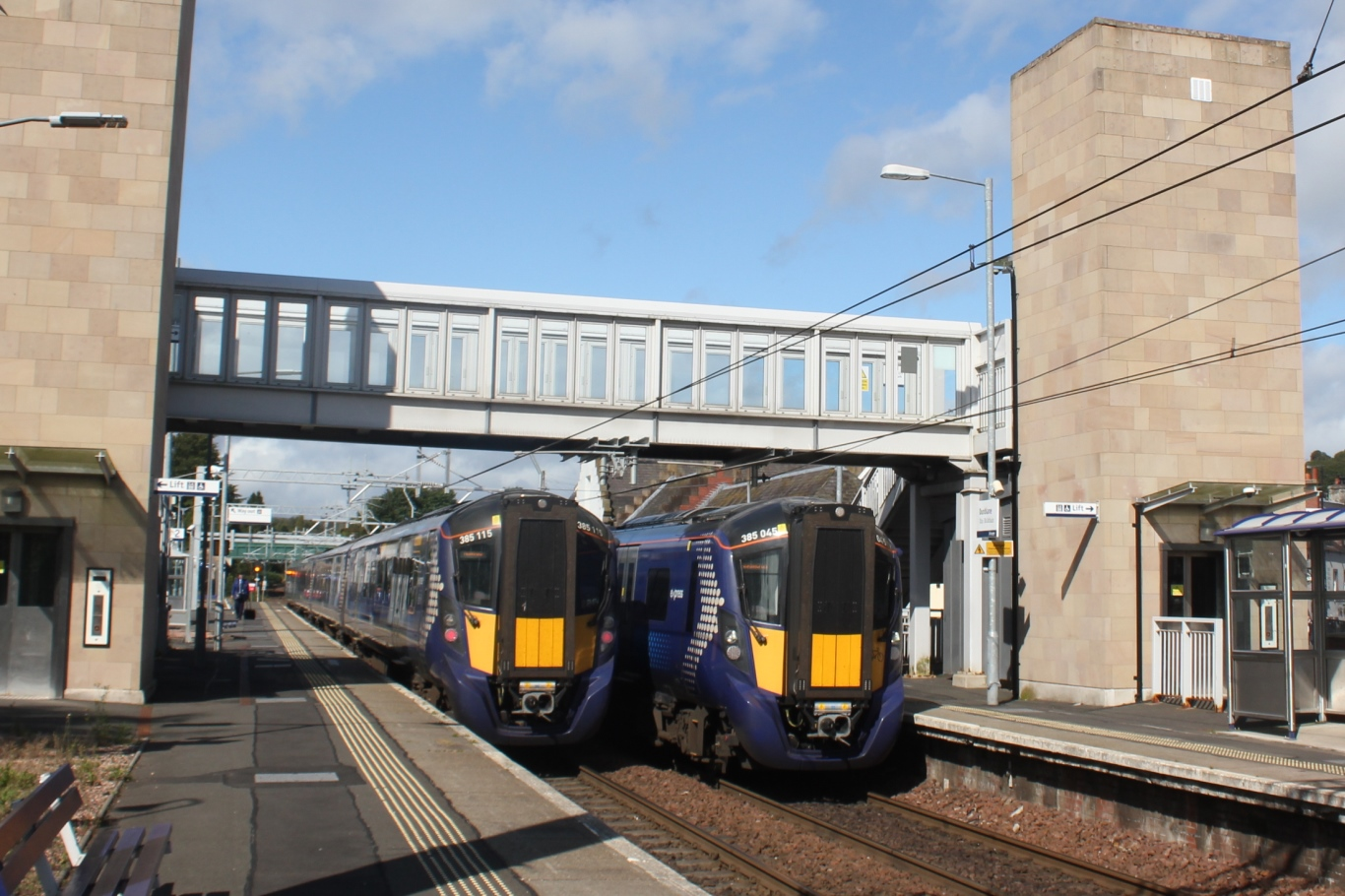
Two ScotRail Class 385 electric multiple units beneath the new footbridge

Dunblane is served by three train operating companies, which provide the following general pattern in trains per hour/week:

ScotRail

- 2 tph to Edinburgh Waverley, via Falkirk Grahamston
- 1 tph to Glasgow Queen Street, via Stirling
- 1 tph to Dundee, via Perth
- 2 tpd to Aberdeen.

Caledonian Sleeper

- 1 tpd to Inverness
- 1 tpd to London Euston

London North Eastern Railway

- 1 tpw to London King's Cross.

Preceding station	National Rail	Following station
Bridge of Allan	ScotRail; Edinburgh–Dunblane line	Gleneagles
Bridge of Allan	ScotRail; Croy Line	Terminus
Stirling	Caledonian Sleeper; Highland Caledonian Sleeper	Gleneagles
Stirling	London North Eastern Railway; East Coast Main Line	Gleneagles
	Historical railways	
Bridge of Allan; Line and station open	Scottish Central Railway; Caledonian Railway	Kinbuck; Line open; station closed
Terminus	Dunblane, Doune and Callander Railway; Caledonian Railway	Doune; Line and station closed

== See also ==
- Public transport in Perth and Kinross
- Dunblane Hotel, formerly the station's hotel
