= Airth railway station =

Disused railway station in Airth, Stirling

Airth

General information
- Location: Airth, Stirling; Scotland
- Coordinates: 56.06398°N 3.81532°W

Other information
- Status: Disused

History
- Original company: Scottish Central Railway
- Pre-grouping: Caledonian Railway
- Post-grouping: London Midland and Scottish Railway

Key dates
- July 1852: Opened as Carnock Road
- 1865: Renamed as Airth Road
- 1866: Renamed as Airth
- 20 September 1954: Station closed
Location

Airth was a railway station serving Airth in the Scottish county of Falkirk.

== History ==
The station was opened as Carnock Road in July 1852 on the Alloa Branch of the Scottish Central Railway, the branch had opened two years earlier in 1850.

The station was sited about 1 3/4 miles (2.8 km) from the village and was located in Stirling. Originally the station was at a level crossing, there was a single platform on a single line of railway with a siding to the south. The OS map has the station named as Carnock Station.

In 1865 the station was renamed Airth Road and it was again renamed as Airth in 1866.

One of the agreements made between the Caledonian Railway (CR) and the North British Railway prior to the Alloa Railway opening in 1885 was to double track the remainder of the Alloa Branch to accommodate the increased traffic that would result from the bridge over the Forth.

When the line was double-tracked the station was rebuilt, the road now formed an overbridge and the station was relocated to the south of the road, there were two platforms connected by a footbridge either side of a double running line, and a siding to the east, and a signal box to the south.

By 1915, a goods shed and several sidings had been added. The goods yard was able to accommodate most types of goods including live stock and was equipped with a two ton crane.

The station closed on 20 September 1954.

Preceding station	Historical railways	Following station
Alloa Junction; Line and station closed	Caledonian Railway; Alloa Railway	Throsk; Line and station closed
Alloa Junction; Line and station closed	Caledonian Railway; Scottish Central Railway	South Alloa; Line and station closed
