= Ronnie Swan =

Scottish footballer

Personal information
- Full name: Ronald McDonald Swan
- Date of birth: 8 January 1941 (age 85)
- Place of birth: Plean, Stirling, Scotland
- Position: Goalkeeper

Senior career*
Years	Team	Apps	(Gls)
- Camelon
1960–1964	East Stirlingshire	60	(0)
1964–1966	Oldham Athletic	64	(0)
1966–1967	Luton Town	14	(0)
1967–1968	Altrincham		
Total		138	(0)
- * Club domestic league appearances and goals

Ronald McDonald Swan (born 8 January 1941) is a Scottish footballer who played as a goalkeeper in the Football League. He was born in Plean.

== See also ==
- Football in Scotland
- List of football clubs in Scotland
