= Greenhill Lower railway station =

Disused railway station in Greenhill, Falkirk

Coordinates: 55.9894°N 3.8903°W

Greenhill Lower
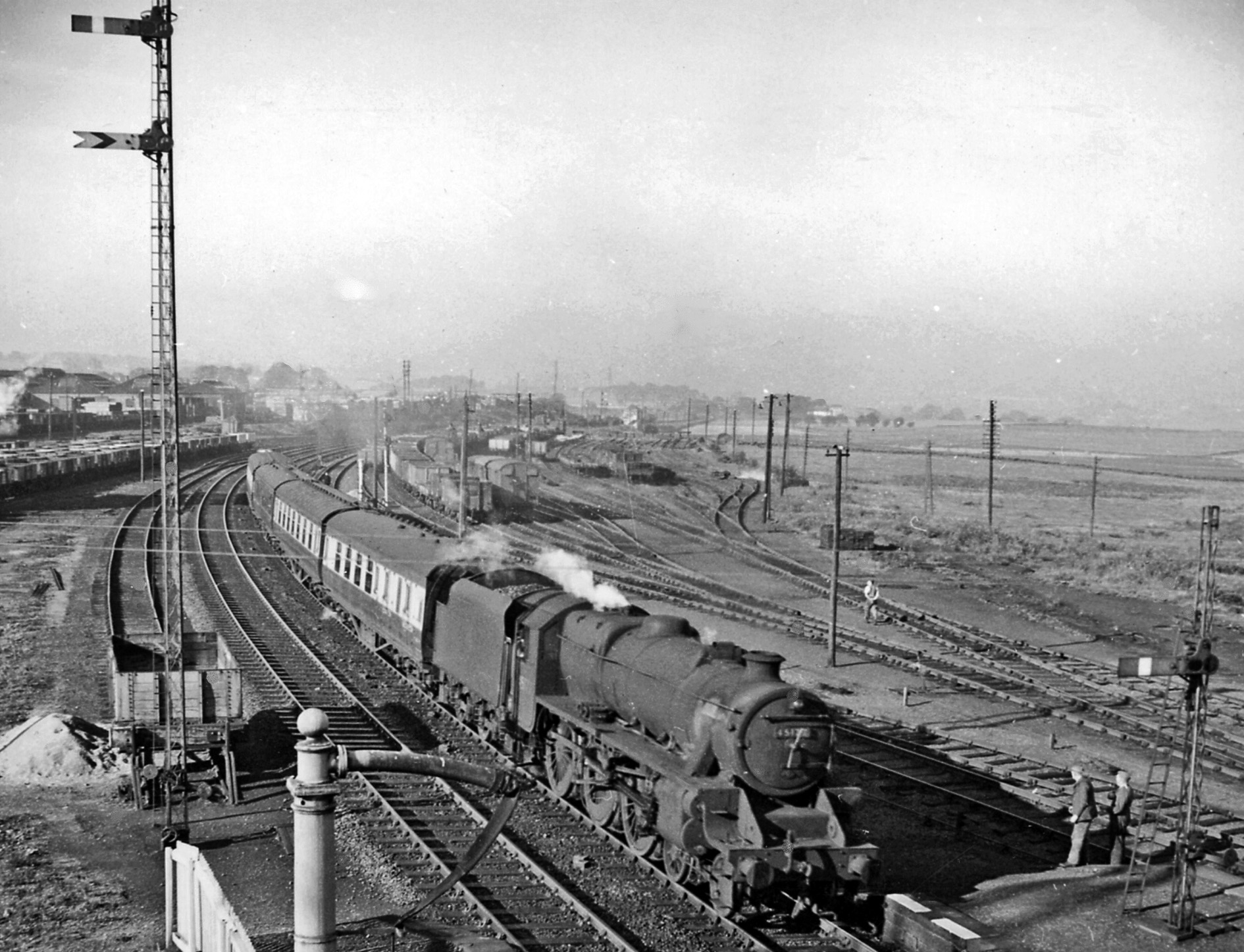
- Stainer 5MT hauling a passenger service to Kirkcaldy in 1957

General information
- Location: Greenhill, Falkirk; Scotland
- Platforms: 2; 3 (later added)

Other information
- Status: Disused

History
- Original company: Caledonian Railway
- Post-grouping: London, Midland and Scottish Railway; British Rail (Scottish Region)

Key dates
- 1 March 1848: Opened
- 18 April 1966: Closed
Location

Greenhill Lower railway station served the village of Greenhill, Falkirk, Scotland from 1848 to 1966 on the Scottish Central Railway.

== History ==
The station opened on 1 March 1848 by the Caledonian Railway. A third platform was added when the Bonnybridge Branch opened. The platform opened on the north side, making the former northern platform an island platform. It was also known as Greenhill Junction in some Caledonian timetables. The station closed on 18 April 1966.

Preceding station	Historical railways	Following station
Denny; Line partly open, station closed	Scottish Central Railway	Bonnybridge; Line and station closed
