= Plean railway station =

Disused railway station in Plean, Stirlingshire

Plean

General information
- Location: Plean, Stirlingshire; Scotland
- Coordinates: 56.0735°N 3.8709°W
- Platforms: 2

Other information
- Status: Disused

History
- Original company: Caledonian Railway
- Pre-grouping: Caledonian Railway
- Post-grouping: London, Midland and Scottish Railway

Key dates
- 1 March 1904: Opened
- 11 June 1956: Closed
Location

Plean railway station served the village of Plean, Stirlingshire, Scotland from 1904 to 1956 on the Scottish Central Railway.

== History ==
The station opened on 1 March 1904 by the Caledonian Railway. To the south were sidings which served nearby collieries and to the north was the signal box. The station closed to both passengers and goods traffic on 11 June 1956.

Preceding station	Historical railways	Following station
Bannockburn; Line open, station closed	Scottish Central Railway	Larbert; Line and station open
