= Plean =

Coordinates: 56.061°N 3.871°W

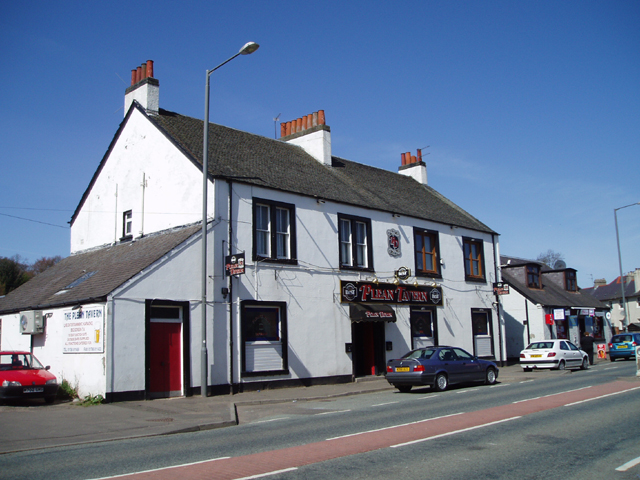
- The Plean Tavern on the town's Main Street

- Location within the Stirling council area
- Population: 1,950 (2020)
- OS grid reference: NS835869
- Civil parish: St. Ninians
- Council area: Stirling
- Lieutenancy area: Stirling and Falkirk
- Country: Scotland
- Sovereign state: United Kingdom
- Post town: STIRLING
- Postcode district: FK7
- Dialling code: 01786
- Police: Scotland
- Fire: Scottish
- Ambulance: Scottish
- UK Parliament: Stirling and Strathallan
- Scottish Parliament: Stirling

Plean is a village, in the Stirling council area of central Scotland, located on the main A9 road from Falkirk. At the 2001 census, Plean had a population of 1,740. Plean has some historic buildings, some council houses and an estate.

== Landmarks ==
Plean has a Church of Scotland Church with an attached graveyard, a petrol station, chip shop, a small clinic, small library, pub, pharmacy, cafe, Indian takeaway and three convenience stores. East Plean Primary School was formerly housed in a traditional building dating from 1874. Many of the original features of the building were retained in the refurbishment of the school, which was completed in summer 2000, including the addition of a purpose-built nursery. The school building was damaged beyond repair in November 2010 when a fire was deliberately started in a hut to the rear. The building was subsequently demolished and a new modern school is being built on the site. Andrew Stretton, 18, set fire to a cardboard box in a shed, but the blaze spread to the main building causing serious damage. Stretton was sentenced at Stirling and ordered to carry out 300 hours of community service, and put on probation for two years.

== Plean Estate ==
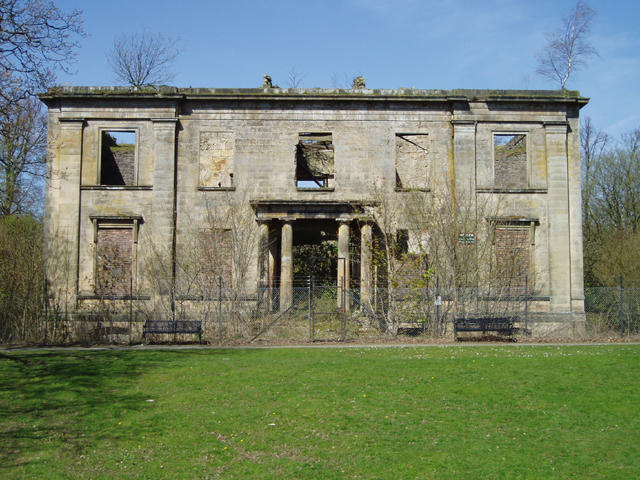
Ruins of Plean House in Plean Country Park

The Plean Estate was once owned by the Earl of Dunmore; he had sold it to the Robert Haldane who was already the owner of the Airthrey Estate in Stirling. It stayed in the Haldane family until it was sold in 1799 to Francis Simpson, a former captain with the East India Company.

Simpson's wife Jean Sophia Cadell, daughter of William Cadell of Banton, was only twenty-one when she died in 1806, she left behind two children for Simpson to look after; one son, William, and a daughter, Frances. In 1819, Francis built Plean House and the other estate buildings.

William Simpson's Home is a local charity based in Plean, established by Francis Simpson, providing residential social care for men with alcohol-related brain damage, and with underlying mental health illness.

Plean Country Park is located in Plean, in the grounds of the now-ruined Plean House. Entry is free and the park is maintained by Stirling Council. Nearby Plean Castle, or Plane Tower, was once a home of the Somerville family. It was restored from ruin twice in the twentieth century and is now a private house.

== Notable people ==
- Ronnie Swan (born 1941), Scottish footballer, goalkeeper
- Campbell Forsyth, the Kilmarnock and Scotland international goalkeeper was born in Plean in 1939.
- Frankie Jones, the fly/bantamweight champion boxer of the 1950s and 1960s was born in Plean in 1933.
- John McAulay VC, spent all of his youth in Plean

== Transportation ==
Plean railway station served the village from 1904 to 1956.
