= Throsk railway station =

Disused railway station in Throsk, Stirling

Throsk

General information
- Location: Throsk, Stirling; Scotland
- Coordinates: 56.0971°N 3.8309°W
- Platforms: 2

Other information
- Status: Disused

History
- Original company: Caledonian Railway
- Pre-grouping: Caledonian Railway
- Post-grouping: London, Midland and Scottish Railway

Key dates
- December 1890: Opened as Throsk Platform
- 1920-21: Renamed as Throsk
- 18 April 1966: Closed
Location

The Throsk railway station was a railway station that served the village of Throsk, Stirling, Scotland from 1890 to 1966.

== History ==
The station was opened in December 1890 as Throsk Platform by the Caledonian Railway. It was situated just south of the Alloa Swing Bridge.

The station became a junction during World War I when the Bandeath Munitions Depot was established on the peninsula to the west of the swing bridge, the junction was between the station and the bridge.

In 1920–21 the station was renamed Throsk and may also have been known as Throsk Halt at times. It closed to both passengers and goods traffic on 18 April 1966.

Preceding station	Disused railways	Following station
Alloa; Line closed, station relocated and open	Caledonian Railway; Alloa Railway	Airth; Line and station closed
