= Stirling =

Coordinates: 56°07′00″N 3°56′13″W

Stirling: Scottish Gaelic: Sruighlea; Scots: Stirlin
- City
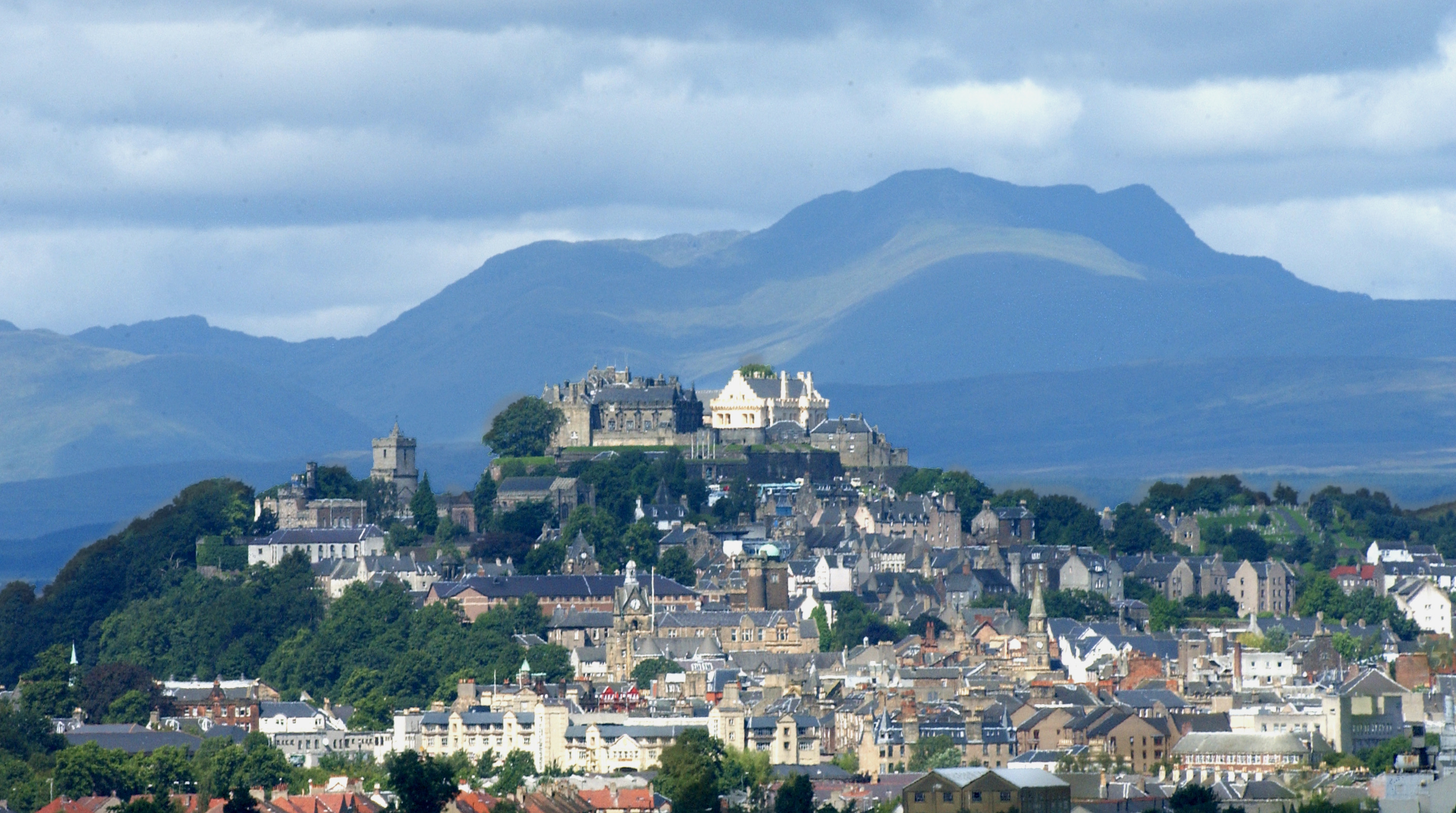
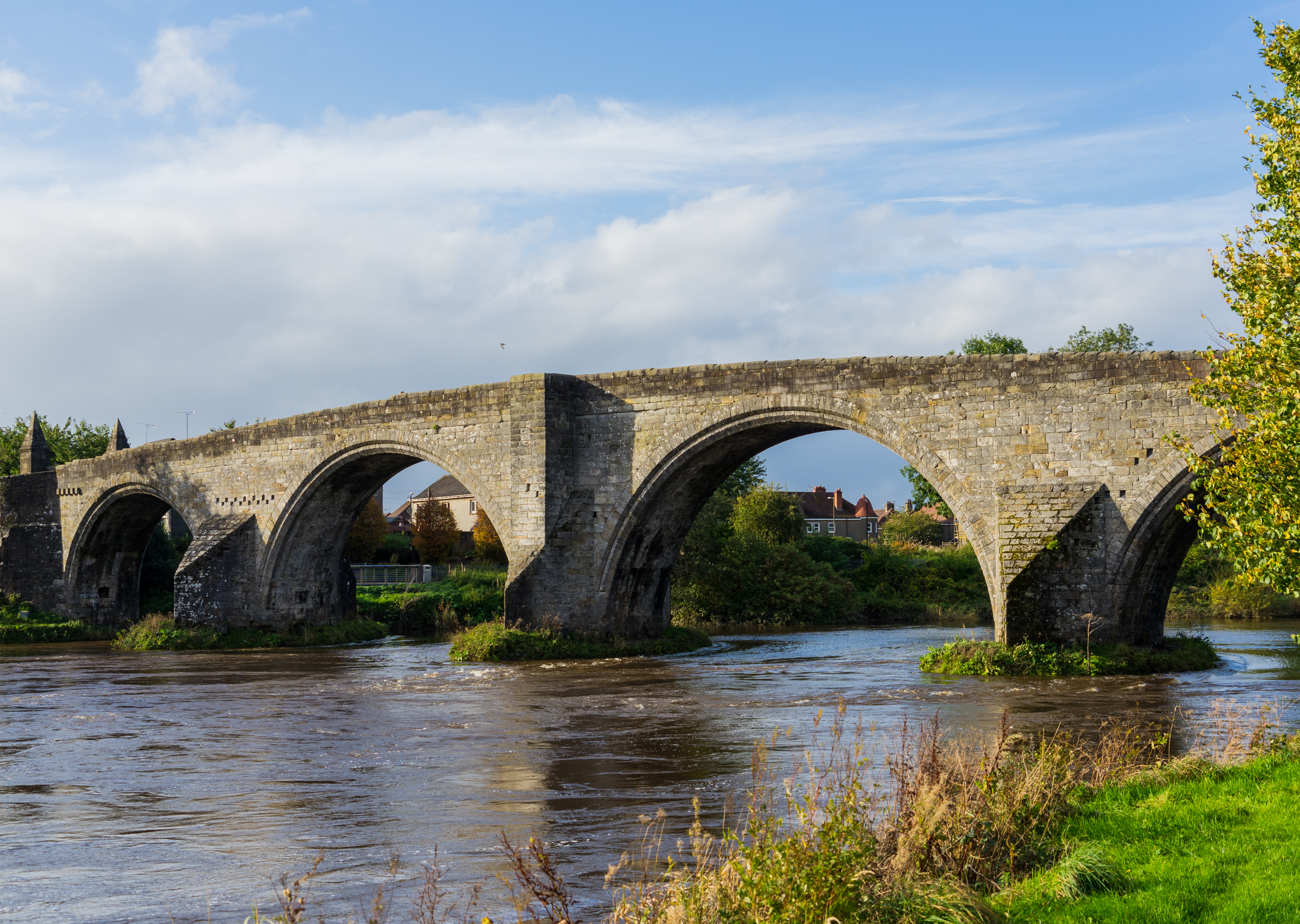
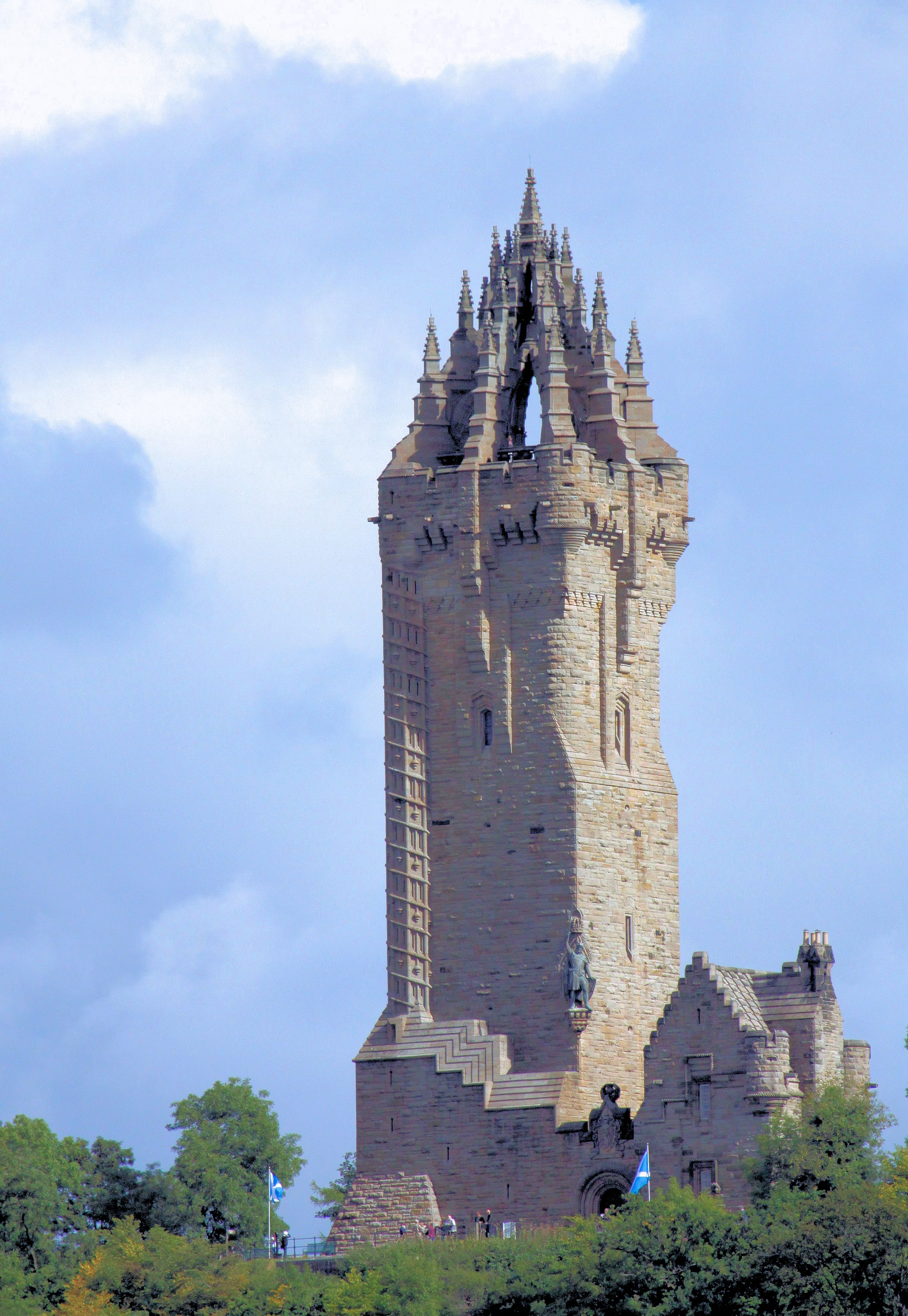
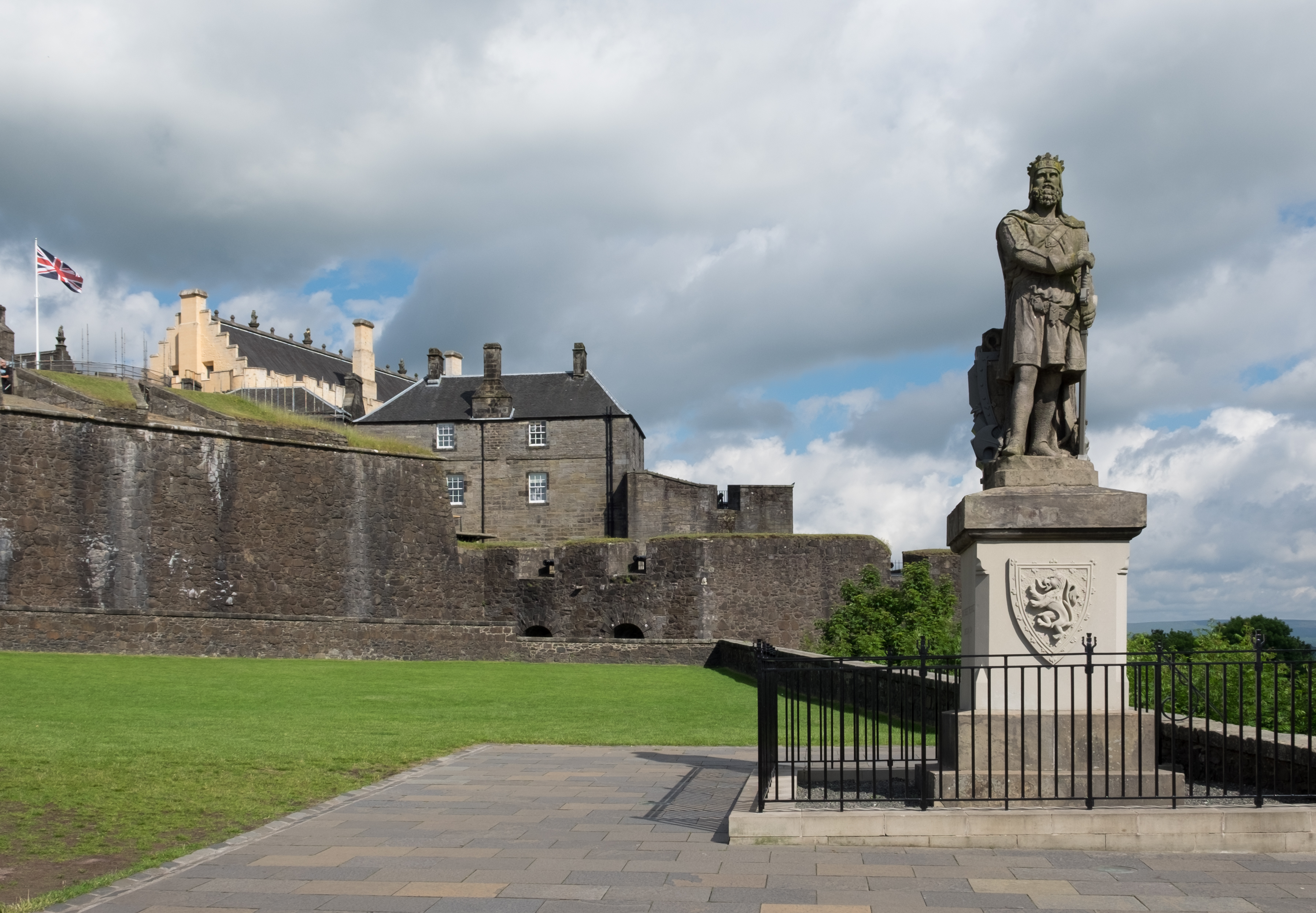
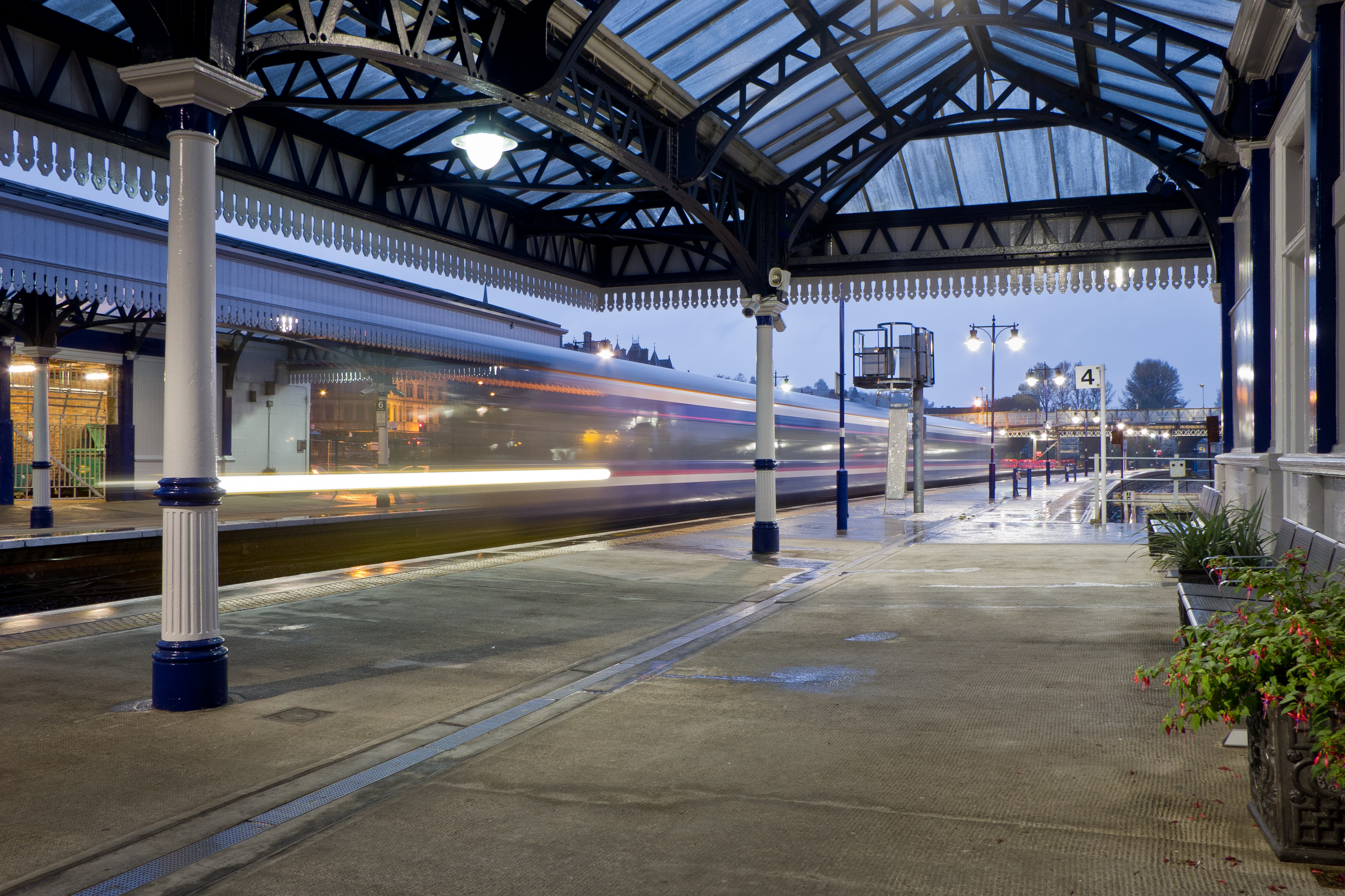
- The skyline of Stirling, with Stirling Castle at the top of the hill and Stùc a' Chroin mountain behind Stirling Old Bridge Wallace Monument Robert the Bruce statue Stirling railway station

- Coat of Arms

- Location within the Stirling council area
- Population: 38,587 (2022)
- Council area: Stirling
- Lieutenancy area: Stirling and Falkirk
- Country: Scotland
- Sovereign state: United Kingdom
- Post town: STIRLING
- Postcode district: FK7–FK9
- Dialling code: 01786
- Police: Scotland
- Fire: Scottish
- Ambulance: Scottish
- UK Parliament: Stirling and Strathallan
- Scottish Parliament: Stirling

Stirling (Note: /ˈstɜːrlɪŋ/; Scots: Stirlin; Scottish Gaelic: Sruighlea [ˈs̪t̪ɾuʝlə]) is a city in Scotland. It is located 26 miles (42 km) north-east of Glasgow and 37 miles (60 km) north-west of Edinburgh. The city is surrounded by rich farmland and had a royal citadel, the medieval old town with its merchants and tradesmen, the Old Bridge and the port are all linked to its history. Situated on the River Forth, Stirling is the administrative centre for the Stirling council area, and is traditionally the county town and historic county of Stirlingshire. Stirling's key position as the lowest bridging point of the River Forth before it broadens towards the Firth of Forth made it a focal point for travel north or south. It has been said that "Stirling, like a huge brooch clasps Highlands and Lowlands together". The city's status as "Gateway to the Highlands" also historically lent it great strategic importance—the credo "he who holds Stirling, holds Scotland" is sometimes attributed to Robert the Bruce.

When Stirling was temporarily under Anglo-Saxon sway, according to a 9th-century legend, it was attacked by Danish invaders. The sound of a wolf roused a sentry, however, who alerted his garrison, which forced a Viking retreat. This led to the wolf being adopted as a symbol of the town as is shown on the 1511 Stirling Jug. The area is today known as Wolfcraig. Even today the wolf appears with a goshawk on the council's coat of arms along with the recently chosen motto: "Steadfast as the Rock".

Once the capital of Scotland, Stirling is visually dominated by Stirling Castle. Stirling also has a medieval parish church, the Church of the Holy Rude, where, on 29 July 1567, the infant James VI was anointed King of Scots by Adam Bothwell, the Bishop of Orkney, with the service concluding after a sermon by John Knox. The poet King was educated by George Buchanan and grew up in Stirling. He was later also crowned King of England and Ireland on 25 July 1603, bringing closer the countries of the United Kingdom. Modern Stirling is a centre for local government, higher education, tourism, retail, and industry. The 2022 census for the population of the city is 38,587 making it the smallest city in Scotland by population. The wider Stirling council area has a population of about 93,750.

One of the principal royal strongholds of the Kingdom of Scotland, Stirling was created a royal burgh by David I between 1124 and 1127. In 2002, as part of the Golden Jubilee celebrations, Stirling was granted city status. In the run up to 2024, it was decided to celebrate Stirling's 900th anniversary at the earliest point it could have happened, the coronation of David I.

== Name(s) and toponymy ==
Stirling's name appears as Strivelin(g) in early sources, later becoming Stirveling and finally Stirling. Its meaning, and even its language of origin, are a matter of debate. In 1930, J. B. Johnston's Place-Names of Scotland suggested a Brittonic origin, and the name was thought likely to be Brittonic by most commentators thereafter. However, in a comprehensive survey of the evidence in 2017, Thomas Owen Clancy showed that a Brittonic etymology is unlikely, and derived the name from Gaelic srib-linn, meaning "pool in the river". (Note: This would theoretically have developed into Sribhlinn in modern Gaelic. Sruighlea is the usual Gaelic name for the city, but Sribhlinn does appear in an isolated 19th century source.)

A geographical survey of Britain in the eighth-century Ecclesiastical History of the English People by Bede also mentions a place called urbs Giudi ("the town of Giudi"). Although its location is not certain, a 2023 study found that "Stirling is the location of urbs Giudi favoured by most scholars", and itself supported this identification. This name is thought to be Celtic. The ninth-century Historia Brittonum mentions a similar-looking battle-site called urbs Iudeu, which many scholars have assumed was the same as Bede's urbs Giudi, but this identification is uncertain.

== History ==
=== Ancient history ===
A stone cist, found in Coneypark Nursery in 1879, is Stirling's oldest catalogued artefact. Bones from the cist were radiocarbon dated and found to be over four millennia old, originating within the date range 2152 to 2021 BC. Nicknamed Torbrex Tam, the man, whose bones were discovered by workmen, died while still in his twenties. Other Bronze Age finds near the city come from the area around Cambusbarron. It had been thought that the Randolphfield standing stones were more than 3000 years old but recent radiocarbon dating suggests they may date from the time of Bruce. The earliest known structures in Stirling are now destroyed but comprised two Neolithic Cursus in Bannockburn. To the south of Stirling is Gillies Hill which contains a series of prehistoric fortifications. Two structures are known: what is currently called Wallstale Dun on the southern end of Touchadam Craig, and Gillies Hill fort on the northwest end of the craig. Both structures were built by Iron Age peoples and Gillies Hill is c 2500 years old while the Wallstale structure is later and is related in form to brochs, these appear to coincide with the Roman period and there are around 40 or so in the wider area. South of the city, the King's Park prehistoric carvings (cup and ring marks) can still be found, these date to c 3000 BC.

=== Roman and early Medieval ===
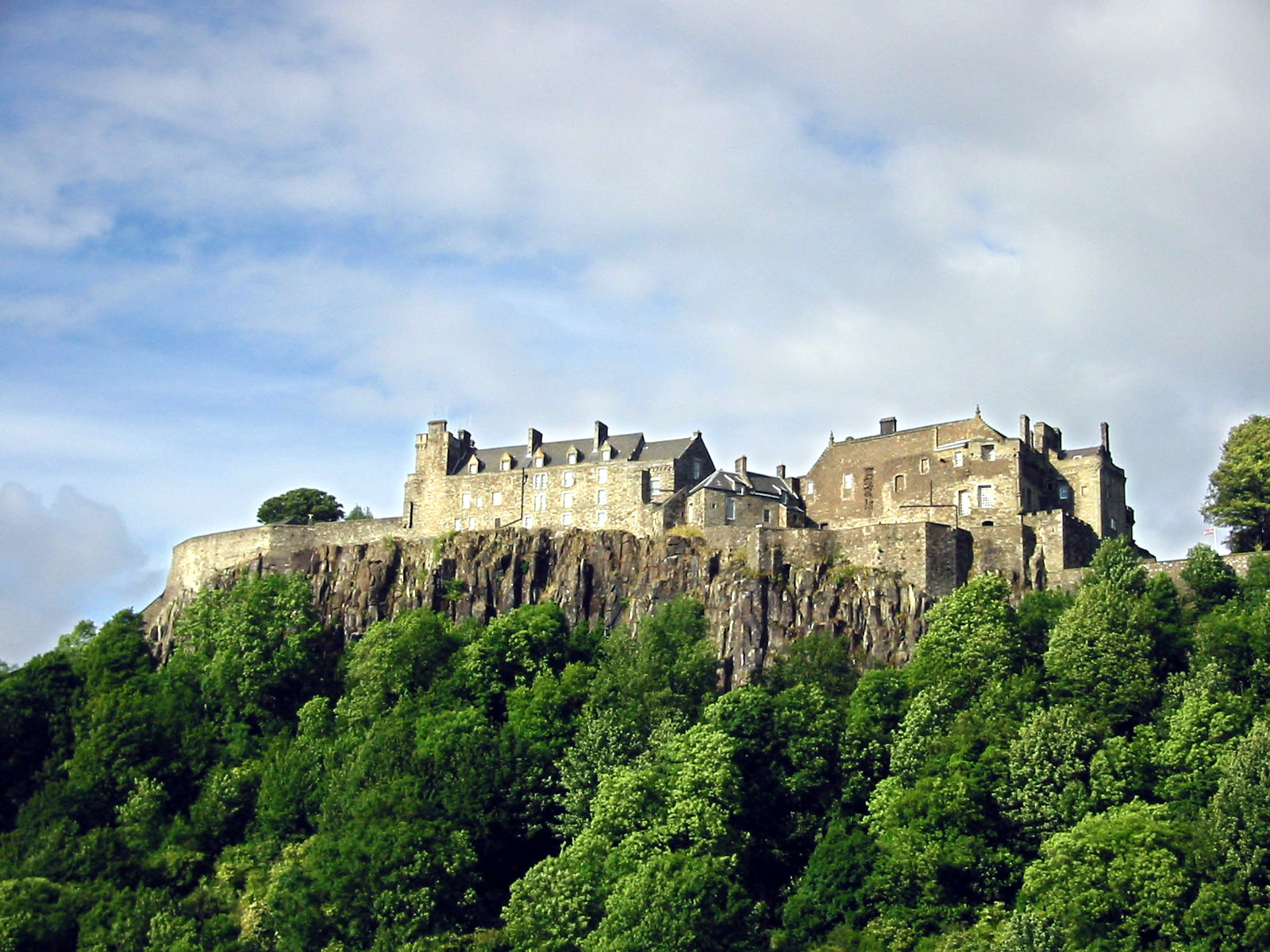
Stirling Castle (southwest aspect)

Its other notable geographic feature is its proximity to the lowest crossing point of the River Forth. Control of the bridge brought military advantage in times of unrest and excise duty, or pontage dues, in peacetime. Unsurprisingly excise men were installed in a covered booth in the centre of the bridge to collect tax from any entering the royal burgh with goods. Stirling remained the river's lowest reliable crossing point (that is, without a weather-dependent ferry or seasonal ford) until the construction of the Alloa Swing Bridge between Throsk and Alloa in 1885.

The city has two Latin mottoes, which appeared on the earliest burgh seal of which an impression of 1296 is on record. The first alludes to the story as recorded by Boece who relates that in 855 Scotland was invaded by two Northumbrian princes, Osbrecht and Ella. They united their forces with the Cumbrian Britons in order to defeat the Scots. Having secured Stirling castle, they built the first stone bridge over the Forth.

On the top they reportedly raised a crucifix with the inscription: "Anglos, a Scotis separat, crux ista remotis; Arma hic stant Bruti; stant Scoti hac sub cruce tuti." Bellenden translated this loosely as "I am free marche, as passengers may ken, To Scottis, to Britonis, and to Inglismen." It may be the stone cross was a tripoint for the three kingdom's borders or marches; the cross functioning both as a dividing territorial marker, and as a uniting witness stone like in the Bible story in Joshua 22. "Angles and Scots here demarked, By this cross kept apart. Brits and Scots armed stand near, By this cross stand safe here." This would make the cross on the centre of the first stone bridge the Heart of Scotland.

The Stirling seal has only the second part, in a slightly different form:

Hic Armis Bruti Scoti Stant Hic Cruce Tuti
(Brits and Scots armed and near, by this cross stand safe here.)

The Latin is apparently not first rate, as it has four syllables in "cruce tuti". However, the meaning seems to be that the Lowland Strathclyde Britons on the southern shore and the Highland Pictish Scots on the northern shore stand protected from each other by their common Christianity.

A more modern translation suggests that rather than Briton, bruit might be better read as brute, i.e. brute Scots, implying a non-Scots identity was retained in Stirling for some time after inclusion into the land controlled by the King of Scots.

The second motto is:

Continet Hoc in Se Nemus et Castrum Strivelinse
(Contained within this seal pressed down, the wood an' castle o' Stirlin' town.)

It has been claimed that the "Bridge" seal was regarded as the Burgh seal proper, the "Castle" seal being simply a reverse, used when the seal was affixed by a lace to a charter. This agrees with a description in an official publication (which spells Bruti with only one letter t). Clearer images are available with different lettering. Sibbald conflated the two mottos into a single rhyme; he gave no indication that he was aware of Boece's work.

Stirling was first declared a royal burgh by King David in the 12th century, with later charters reaffirmed by subsequent monarchs. A ferry, and later bridge, on the River Forth at Stirling brought wealth and strategic influence, as did its tidal port at Riverside. As Stirling's economy grew, a Royal Park was established as a landscape setting to the north of the castle in the 12th century. The short-lived New Park was established in the later 13th century and contains a cockshot wood (Coxet Hill), likely to have been used as a base in the Battle of Bannockburn. Major battles during the Wars of Scottish Independence took place at the Stirling Old Bridge in 1297 and at the nearby village of Bannockburn in 1314 involving Andrew Moray and William Wallace, and Robert the Bruce respectively. After the Battle of Stirling Bridge, Moray and Wallace wrote to Hanseatic League leaders in Lübeck and Hamburg to encourage trade between Scottish and German ports. There were also several Sieges of Stirling Castle in the conflict, notably in 1304.

=== Late Medieval and early Modern ===
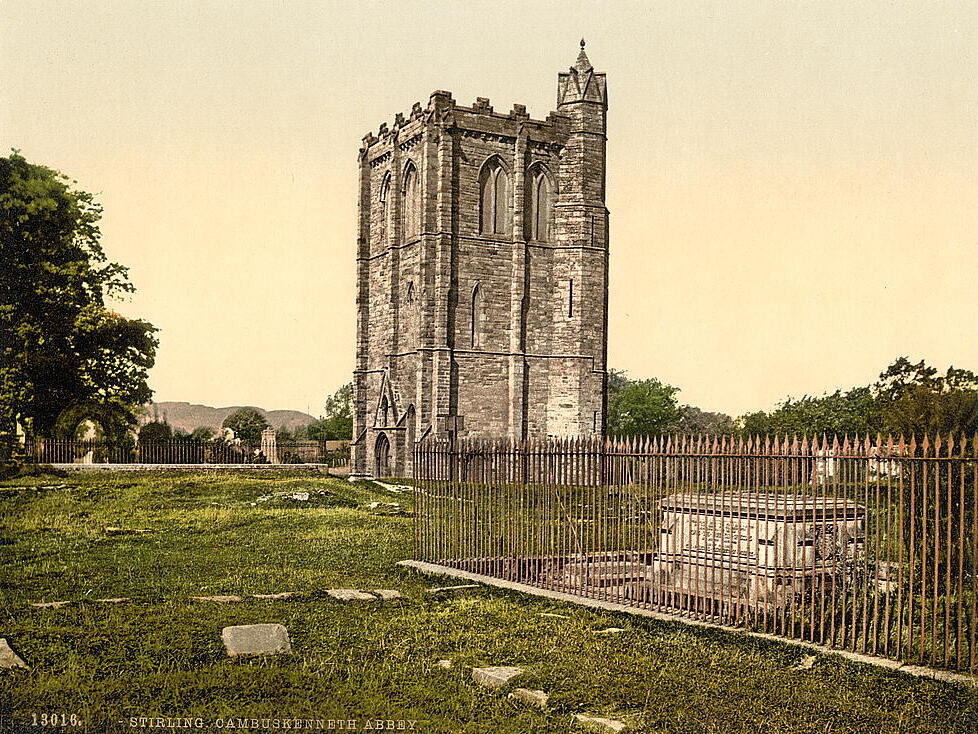
The tomb of James III, King of Scots, and Margaret of Denmark at Cambuskenneth Abbey

Another important historical site in the area is the ruins of Cambuskenneth Abbey, the resting place of King James III of Scotland and his queen, Margaret of Denmark. The king died at the Battle of Sauchieburn by forces nominally led by his son and successor James IV. During the Wars of the Three Kingdoms, the Battle of Stirling also took place in the centre of Stirling on 12 September 1648. The fortifications continued to play a strategic military role during the 18th-century Jacobite risings. In 1715, the Earl of Mar failed to take control of the castle. In January 1746, the army of Bonnie Prince Charlie seized control of the town but failed to take the Castle. On their consequent retreat northwards, they blew up the church of St. Ninians where they had been storing munitions; only the tower survived and can be seen to this day. The castle and the church are shown on Blaeu's map of 1654 which was derived from Pont's earlier map.

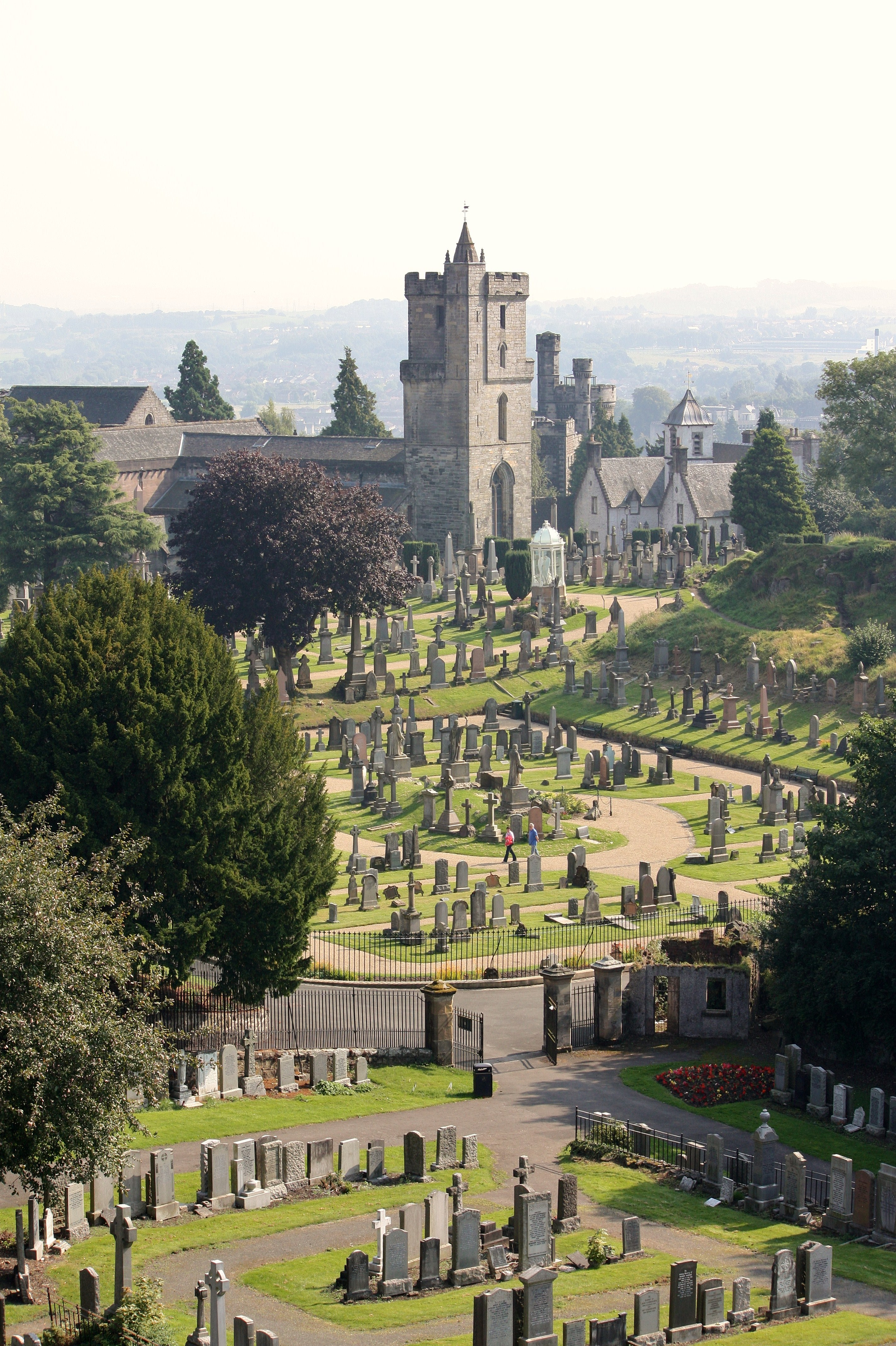
Church of the Holy Rude (Holy Cross)

Standing near the castle, the Church of the Holy Rude is one of the town's most historically important buildings. Founded in 1129 it is the second oldest building in the city after Stirling castle. It was rebuilt in the 15th-century after Stirling suffered a catastrophic fire in 1405, and is reputed to be the only surviving church in the United Kingdom apart from Westminster Abbey to have held a coronation. The death of James V led to the Rough Wooing, a period where Henry VIII of England attempted to marry the infant Mary Queen of Scots to his son. Stirling responded by constructing a burgh wall to the south of town, which is among the best preserved in Scotland. Recent archaeological research has identified two new bastions or positions of strength on the wall and Stirling's last surviving medieval gate. On 29 July 1567 the infant son of Mary, Queen of Scots, was anointed James VI of Scotland in the church. James' bride, Anne of Denmark was crowned in the church at Holyrood Palace in Edinburgh. The Holy Rude congregation still meet and some 19th century parish records survive. Musket shot marks that may come from Cromwell's troops during the Wars of the Three Kingdoms are clearly visible on the tower and apse of the church. There are also musket scars on a gravestone in the cemetery indicating the troop movement to the castle.

Economically, the city's port supported foreign trade, historically doing significant trade in the Low Countries, particularly with Bruges in Belgium and Veere in the Netherlands. In the 16th century there were so many Scots in Danzig in Prussia that they had their own church congregation and trade is mentioned with that city in Stirling Council's minutes of 1560. Around John Cowane's time there is an account which states there were about 30,000 Scots families living in Poland although that was possibly an exaggeration. Trade with the Baltic also took place such as a timber trade with Norway.

After the Jacobite threat had faded but before the railways were established, the Highland cattle drovers would use the Auld Brig on their way to market at Falkirk or Stenhousemuir. Three times a year, tens of thousands of cattle, sheep and ponies were moved together to the trysts in the south with some drovers going as far as Carlisle or even London's Smithfield. There is a record of a four-mile long tailback (of livestock) developing from St. Ninians to Bridge of Allan after a St. Ninians tollman had a dispute.

=== Victorian and Modern ===
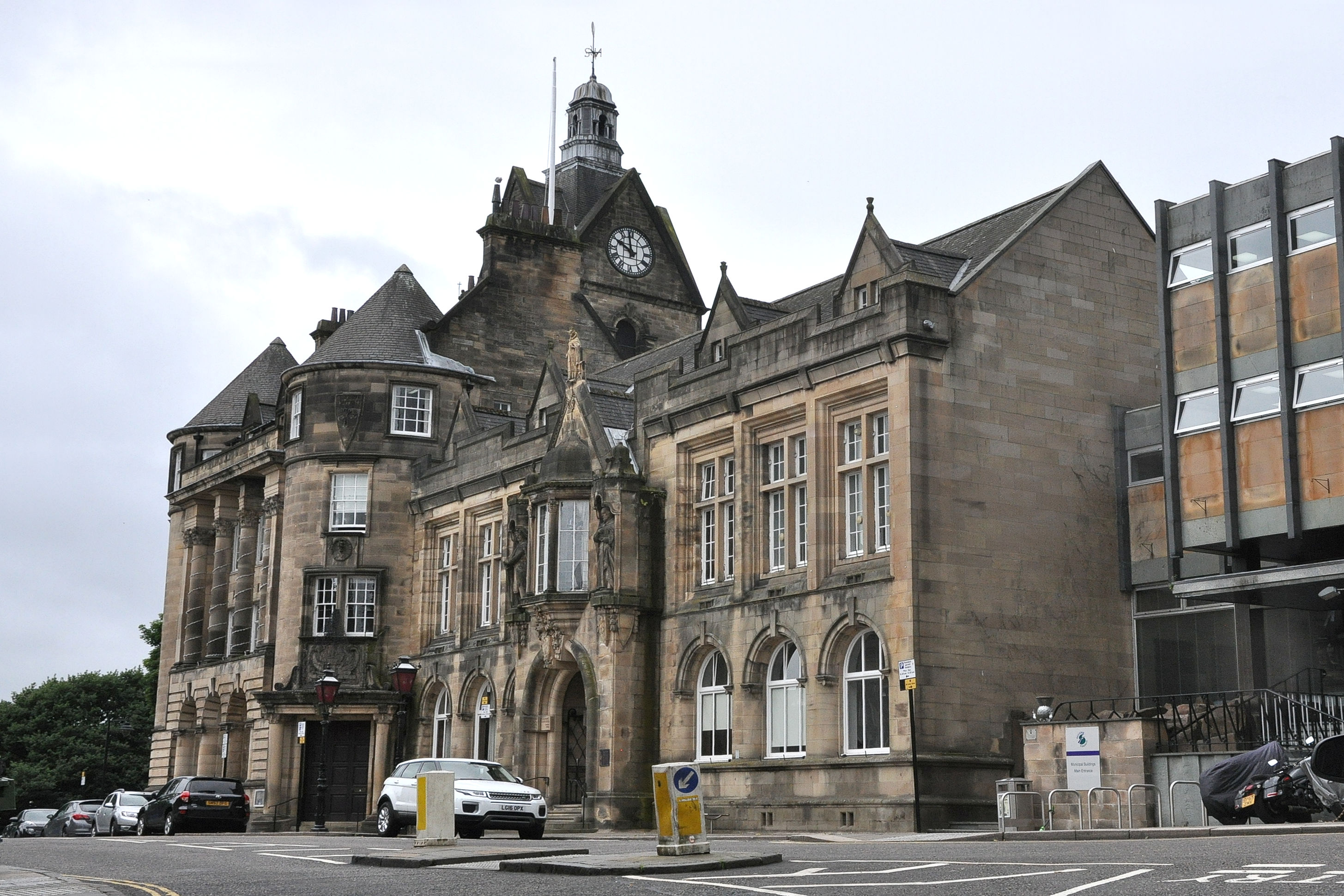
The Municipal Buildings

In the early 19th century an "exceedingly low" cost steamboat service used to run between Stirling and Newhaven or Granton. The coming of the railways in 1848 started the decline of the river traffic, not least because the Alloa Swing Bridge downstream restricted access for shipping. The railways did provide opportunity too with one Riverside company selling their reaping machines as far afield as Syria and Australia. Similarly, in 1861, a company making baby carriages was set up. These prams were exported to Canada, South America, India and South Africa.

The Princes Street drill hall was completed in 1908 and the Municipal Buildings, which formed the headquarters of Stirling Burgh Council for much of the 20th century, were completed in 1918.

Following the World Wars there was some increase in the use of the port including a tea trade with India. However, with normal shipping lanes open, the growth of the railways including The Forth Rail Bridge, left the harbour uneconomical and by the mid 20th century the port had ceased to operate.

== Governance ==
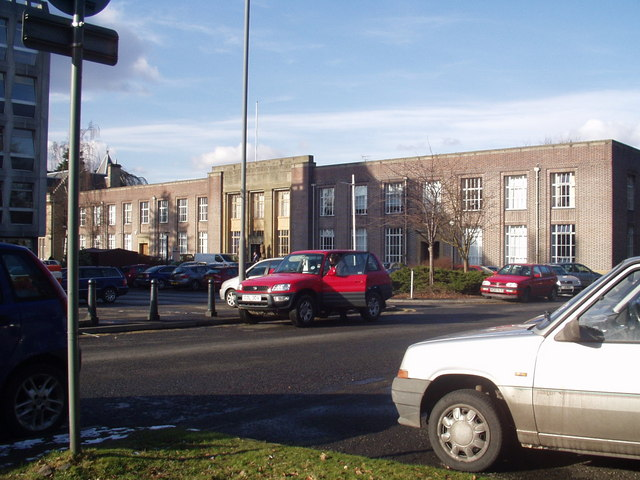
Old Viewforth is the administrative centre of Stirling Council.

In terms of local government, the city of Stirling is a part of the wider Stirling Council area, which is based at Old Viewforth and governs on matters of local administration as set out by the Local Government etc (Scotland) Act 1994.

For the purposes of the Scottish Parliament, the city of Stirling forms part of the Stirling constituency of the Scottish Parliament constituency. The Stirling Scottish Parliament (or Holyrood) constituency created in 1999 is one of nine within the Mid Scotland and Fife electoral region. Each constituency elects one Member of the Scottish Parliament (MSP) by the first past the post system of election, and the region elects seven additional members to produce a form of proportional representation. The constituency's Member of the Scottish Parliament (MSP) is Evelyn Tweed of the Scottish National Party (SNP).

In terms of national government, the city of Stirling forms part of the county constituency of Stirling and Strathallan, electing one Member of Parliament (MP) to the House of Commons of the parliament of the United Kingdom by first past the post system. Chris Kane of the Labour Party has been the MP for Stirling and Strathallan since the 2024 general election, when the seat was first contested - prior to this, Stirling was part of the constituency of Stirling.

Historical voting records can be found in online databases.

== Geography ==
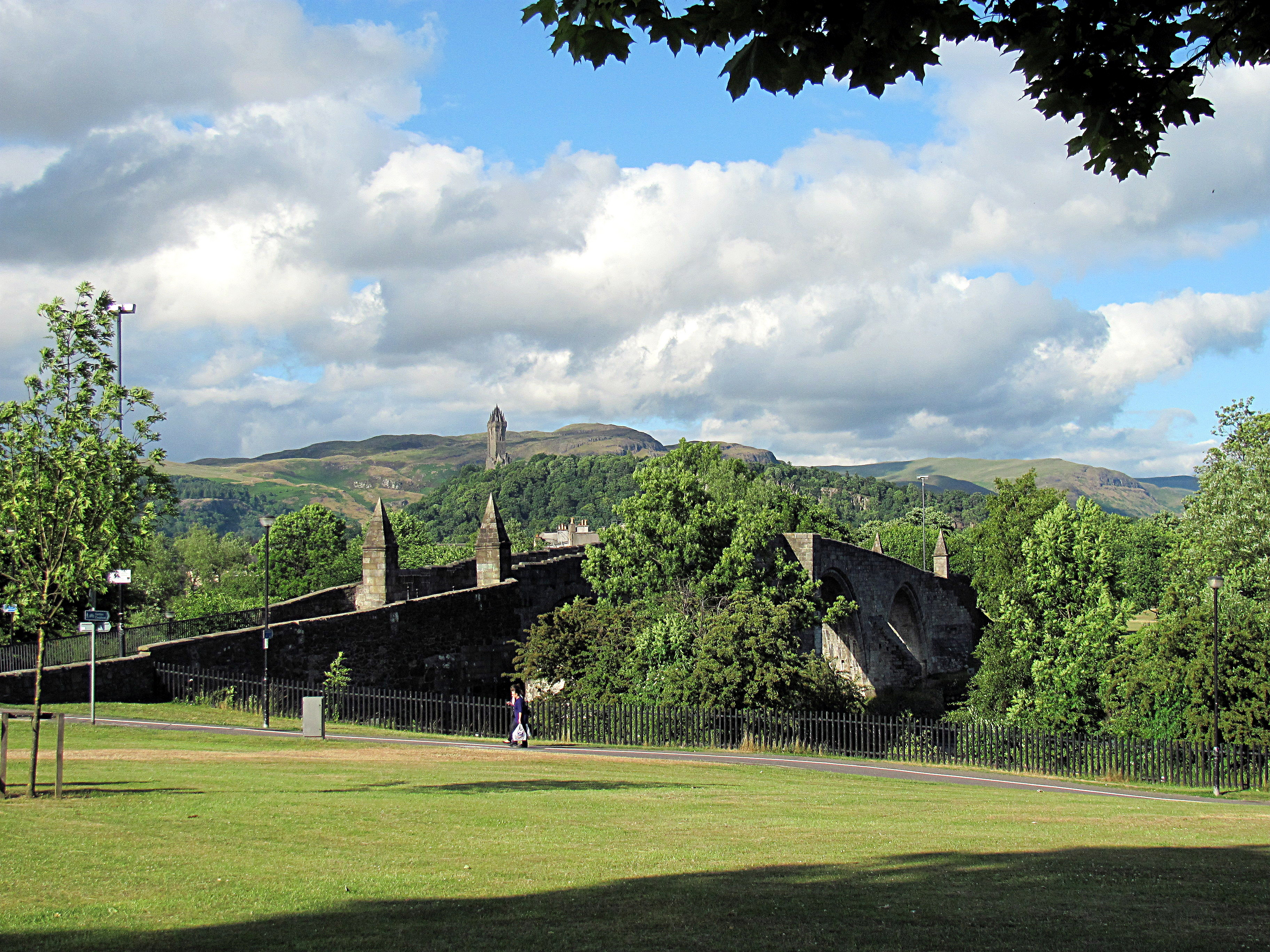
Stirling Old Bridge with the Wallace Monument and Abbey Craig in the background, one of a series of local Crag and Tail hills.

Stirling is renowned as the Gateway to the Highlands and is generally regarded as occupying a strategic position at the point where the flatter, largely undulating Scottish Lowlands meet the rugged slopes of the Highlands along the Highland Boundary Fault. The starkness of this contrast is evidenced by the many hills and mountains of the lower Highlands such as Ben Vorlich and Ben Ledi which can be seen to the northwest of the city. On the other hand, the Carse of Stirling, stretching to the west and east of the city, is one of the flattest and most agriculturally productive expanses of land in the whole of Scotland.

The land surrounding Stirling has been most affected by glacial erosion and deposition. The city itself has grown up around its castle which stands atop an ancient quartz-dolerite sill, known as the Stirling Sill, a major defensive position which was at the lowest crossing point on the River Forth. Stirling stands on the Forth at the point where the river widens and becomes tidal. To the east of the city the Ochil Hills dominate the skyline with the highest peak in the range being Ben Cleuch, although Dumyat is more noticeable from Stirling. The Ochils meet the flat carse (floodplain) of the River Forth to the east of the distinctive geographical feature of Abbey Craig, a crag and tail hill upon which stands the 220 ft (67 m) high National Wallace Monument.

=== Areas of Stirling ===
Top of the Town consists of Broad Street, Castle Wynd, Ballengeich Pass, Lower Castle Hill Road, Darnley Street, Baker Street (formerly Baxters St), St John Street and St Mary's Wynd. These streets all lead up to Stirling Castle and are the favourite haunt of tourists who stop off at the Old Town Jail, Mar's Wark, Argyll's Lodging and the castle. Ballengeich Pass leads to the graveyard at Ballengeich and the Castle Wynd winds past the old graveyard. The Top of the Town from Broad Street upwards is renowned for its cobblestoned roads, and cars can be heard rattling over the cobblestones on the way down. Craft shops and tourist-focused shops are evident on the way up and once at the top, panoramic views are available across Stirling and beyond.

All areas

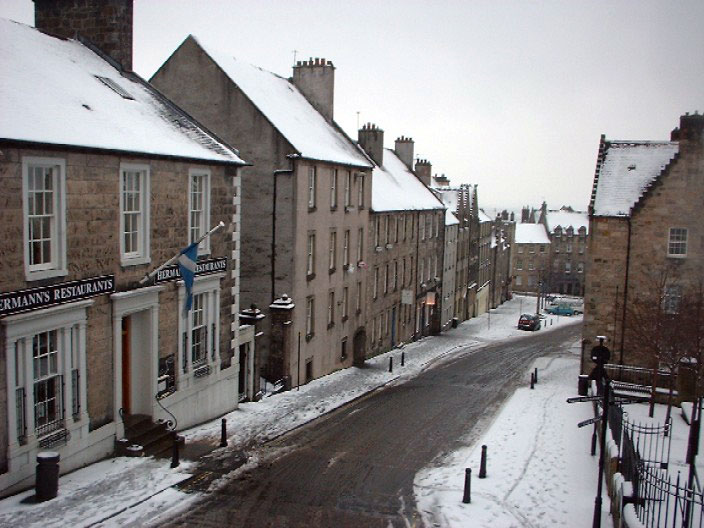
Broad Street, at the heart of Stirling's Old Town area (called "Top of the Town" by locals)

- Abbey Craig
- Airthrey
- Allan Park
- Back o' Hill
- Bannockburn
- Borestone
- Braehead
- Bridgehaugh
- Broomridge
- Brucefields
- Burghmuir
- Cambusbarron
- Cambuskenneth
- Causewayhead
- Chartershall
- Corn Exchange
- Cornton
- Coxethill
- Craigforth
- Craigmill
- Craig Leith
- Cultenhove
- Dumyat
- Forthbank
- Gillies Hill
- Gowan Hill
- Hillpark
- Kenningknowes
- Kersemill
- Kildean
- King's Park
- Ladyneuk
- Laurelhill
- Livilands
- Loanhead
- Logie
- Mote Hill
- Meadowforth
- Mercat Cross
- Pirnhall
- Queenshaugh
- Raploch
- Randolphfield
- Riverside
- Spittal Hill
- Springkerse
- St. Ninians
- Top of the Town
- Torbrex
- Whins of Milton
- Viewforth
- Westhaugh
- Wolfcraig

Historical place names for Stirling town in 1858–61 were compiled by O.S. map makers.

=== Climate ===
Like most of the United Kingdom, Stirling has an oceanic climate (Köppen Cfb) with mild summers and cool, wet winters. Stirling has some of the warmest summers in all of Scotland, being relatively far away from the cooling effects of the North Sea and the Firth of Clyde.

Climate data for Stirling (1991–2020 averages, extremes 2009–present, [25 m or 82 ft asl])
Month	Jan	Feb	Mar	Apr	May	Jun	Jul	Aug	Sep	Oct	Nov	Dec	Year
Record high °C (°F)	13.6 (56.5)	15.5 (59.9)	17.1 (62.8)	21.1 (70.0)	27.8 (82.0)	32.3 (90.1)	29.0 (84.2)	24.9 (76.8)	23.8 (74.8)	19.7 (67.5)	15.7 (60.3)	14.5 (58.1)	32.3 (90.1)
Mean daily maximum °C (°F)	7.3 (45.1)	8.1 (46.6)	9.9 (49.8)	12.4 (54.3)	15.7 (60.3)	18.1 (64.6)	19.9 (67.8)	19.5 (67.1)	17.1 (62.8)	13.5 (56.3)	10.0 (50.0)	7.5 (45.5)	13.3 (55.9)
Daily mean °C (°F)	4.4 (39.9)	5.0 (41.0)	6.4 (43.5)	8.3 (46.9)	11.3 (52.3)	14.0 (57.2)	15.7 (60.3)	15.3 (59.5)	12.9 (55.2)	9.8 (49.6)	6.7 (44.1)	4.3 (39.7)	9.5 (49.1)
Mean daily minimum °C (°F)	1.4 (34.5)	1.9 (35.4)	2.9 (37.2)	4.3 (39.7)	6.9 (44.4)	9.8 (49.6)	11.5 (52.7)	11.1 (52.0)	8.8 (47.8)	6.2 (43.2)	3.5 (38.3)	1.1 (34.0)	5.8 (42.4)
Record low °C (°F)	−11.1 (12.0)	−7.6 (18.3)	−5.8 (21.6)	−3.9 (25.0)	−1.7 (28.9)	3.6 (38.5)	5.0 (41.0)	3.8 (38.8)	1.0 (33.8)	−2.8 (27.0)	−6.6 (20.1)	−15.6 (3.9)	−15.6 (3.9)
Average precipitation mm (inches)	129.3 (5.09)	97.3 (3.83)	74.5 (2.93)	51.4 (2.02)	56.9 (2.24)	66.6 (2.62)	70.1 (2.76)	76.1 (3.00)	76.3 (3.00)	107.4 (4.23)	109.2 (4.30)	103.1 (4.06)	1,018.1 (40.08)
Average precipitation days (≥ 1.0 mm)	16.3	13.6	12.8	10.6	11.3	11.7	13.0	13.0	12.6	15.2	16.1	15.4	161.4
Mean monthly sunshine hours	39.1	66.9	99.5	137.8	183.1	162.0	153.7	150.5	119.5	81.3	54.0	32.2	1,279.6
Source 1: Met Office
Source 2: Stirling Weather

== Demography ==
The population of the settlement of Stirling in the 2022 Census was 49,928, which is very similar to the figure for the settlement in 2011 of 49,950. In 2022, the Stirling council area had a population of 92,600, reflecting a 2.6% increase from the 2011 census. Of the population in 2022, 51.9% of the population were female, while 48.1% were male. The age distribution in Stirling showed that 16.7% of the population was under 15 years old, which is slightly higher than Scotland's average of 15%. Additionally, Stirling had a larger proportion of residents of pensionable age, with 20.41% of the population being 65 or older, compared to the Scottish average of 20.1%.

Historical records also exist both in book form and in online databases.

== Culture ==
The Stirling Wolf (1704, oil on canvas, artist unknown), The Stirling Smith Art Gallery & Museum

Walking the Marches is a custom probably started in the 12th century. The only way the town's boundaries could be protected was to walk round inspecting them annually. The walk was followed by a dinner. This was traditionally done by the Birlaw men made up from members of the Seven Trades, the Guildry and Council. In 2014 the tradition was revived after an official abeyance of several years. It now takes place on the last Saturday in May and is open for all to take part in.

There are about sixteen libraries and two mobile libraries in Stirling. The Smith Art Gallery and Museum is now free to tourists and residents alike. Shearer's 1895 Penny Guide to Stirling and Neighbourhood used to list it under "How to spend a few hours on a wet day". The Macrobert Arts Centre has a variety of exhibitions and performances. There are many events at the Stirling Tolbooth and at The Albert Halls. Stirling has hosted the National Mòd several times: in 1909, 1961, 1971 and 1987.

== Religion ==
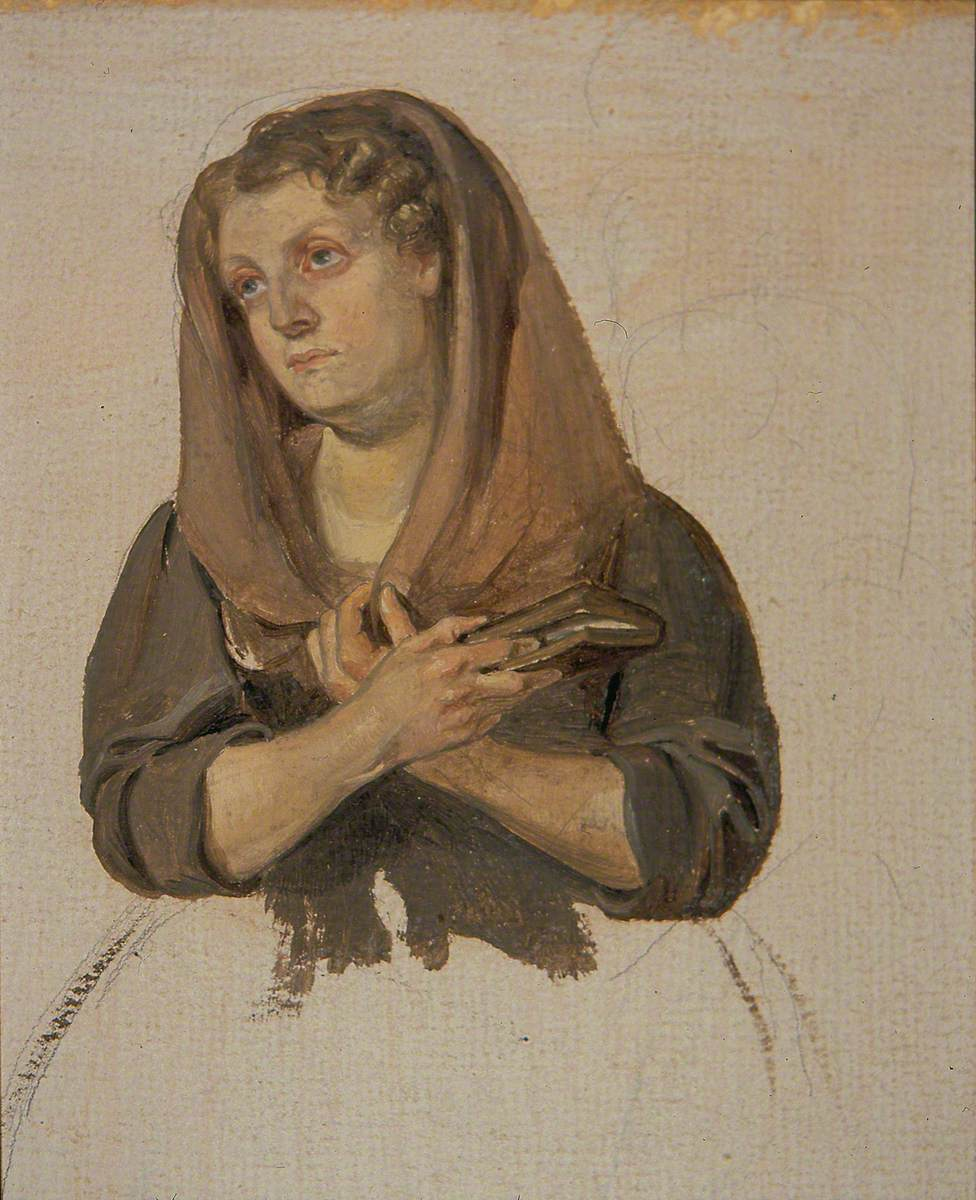
Woman Clasping the Bible − George Harvey (1806–1876), The Stirling Smith Art Gallery & Museum

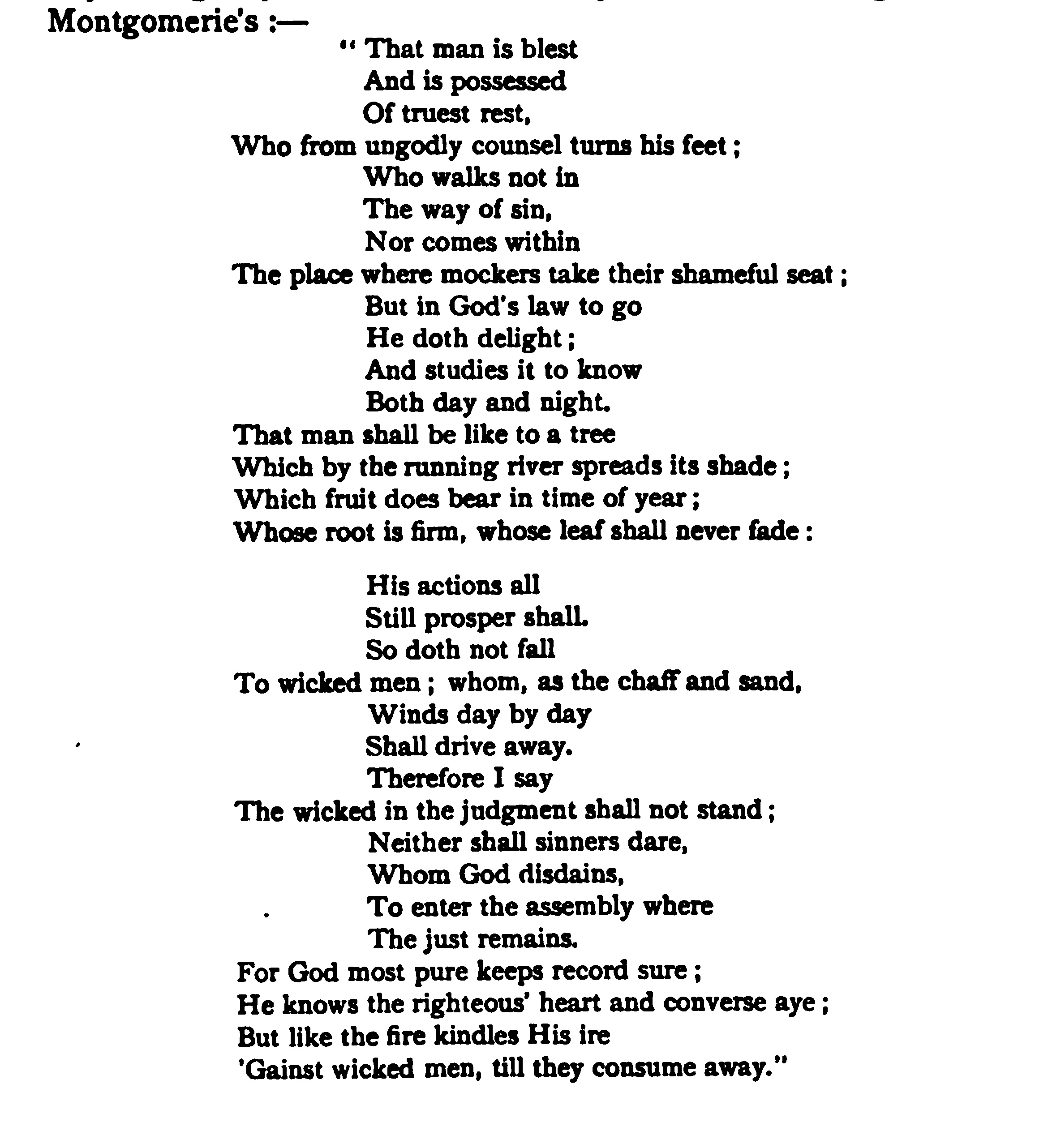
The earliest known version of Psalm 1 in Scots by Alexander Montgomerie from Zabur or The Book of Psalms. He was one of a circle of poets in the Stirling court of James VI.

There are currently about 20 churches in the city. These include:

Church of Scotland under the Presbytery of Perth

- Cambusbarron Parish Church
- Church of the Holy Rude
- North Parish Church
- Park Church
- St Mark's Parish Church
- St Ninians Old Parish Church
- Viewfield Church

Roman Catholic under the Archdiocese of St Andrews and Edinburgh

- Holy Spirit, St. Ninians
- Our Lady and St Ninian's, Bannockburn
- St Margaret of Scotland and Holy Spirit, Raploch
- St Mary's Church, Top of the Town

Other churches

- Cornerstone Community Church
- Cornton Baptist Church
- Holy Trinity Episcopal Church
- St Ninians United Free Church of Scotland
- Stirling Baptist Church
- Stirling Free Church
- Stirling Methodist Church
- St. Ninian's Community Church
- The Salvation Army

Islam

- Central Scotland Islamic Centre

== Economy ==
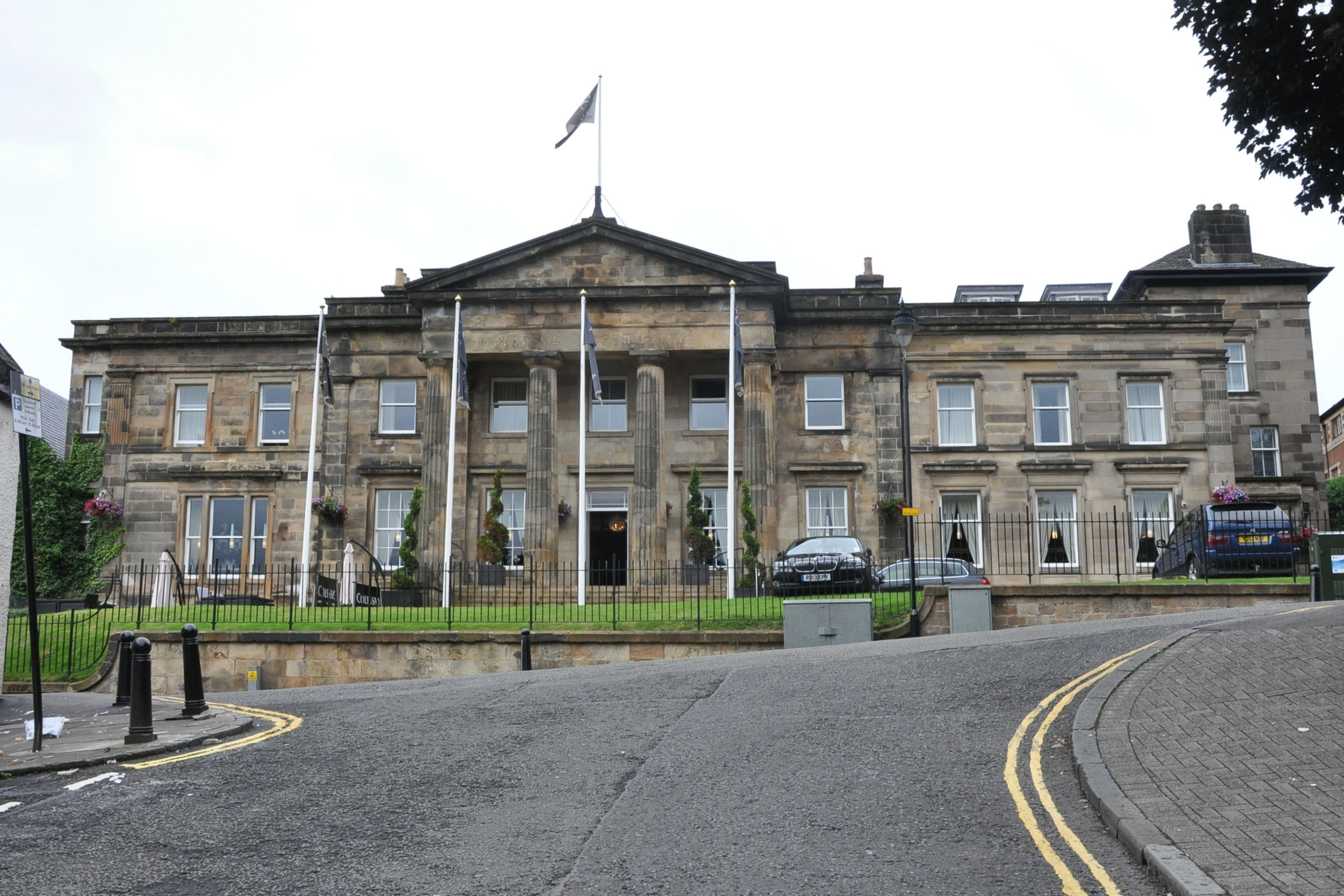
Hotel Colessio. Tourism is a major part of the economy of Stirling.

With Stirling's development as a market town and its location as the focus of transport and communications in the region, it has developed a substantial retail sector serving a wide range of surrounding communities as well as the city itself. Primarily centred on the city centre, there are a large number of chain stores in and adjacent to the Thistles shopping centre. This has been augmented by out-of-town developments such as the Springkerse Retail Park on the city bypass to the east of Stirling.

The Forthside regeneration project on the site of the former port area and the 40-acre (160,000 m^{2}) former Ministry of Defence site, adjacent to Stirling Railway Station, is linked to the railway station via Forthside Bridge. The development comprises retail, residential and commercial elements, including a conference centre, hotel and Vue multiplex cinema, expanding the city centre area and linking it to the River Forth, which had been cut off from the city centre area since the construction of the A9 bypass under the railway station in the 1960s.

In the service sector, financial and insurance services as well as tourism are the biggest employers. The financial services and insurance company Scottish Amicable Life Assurance, later part of Prudential and M&G, established a large base at Craigforth on the outskirts of Stirling in the 1970s.

In terms of tourism, the presence of such historical monuments as Stirling Castle and the Wallace Monument and other nearby attractions like Blair Drummond Safari Park has bolstered Stirling's position as a significant tourist destination in Scotland.

The University of Stirling and Stirling Council are two of the biggest employers in the area. Knowledge related industries, research and development as well as life sciences have clustered around the university in the Stirling University Innovation Park, close to its main campus.

Mauchline ware started producing wooden snuff-boxes in 1790 in Mauchline, Ayrshire. They were produced of the wood from the trees from the Castle craig. Today they are highly collectible.

Stirling is home to national construction companies Ogilvie Group, chaired by Duncan Ogilvie, who was listed in the Sunday Times Rich List as being worth £32 million in 2009.

A Bank of Scotland survey in 2009 found that workers in Stirling had the highest average earnings of £716 a week.

== Transport ==
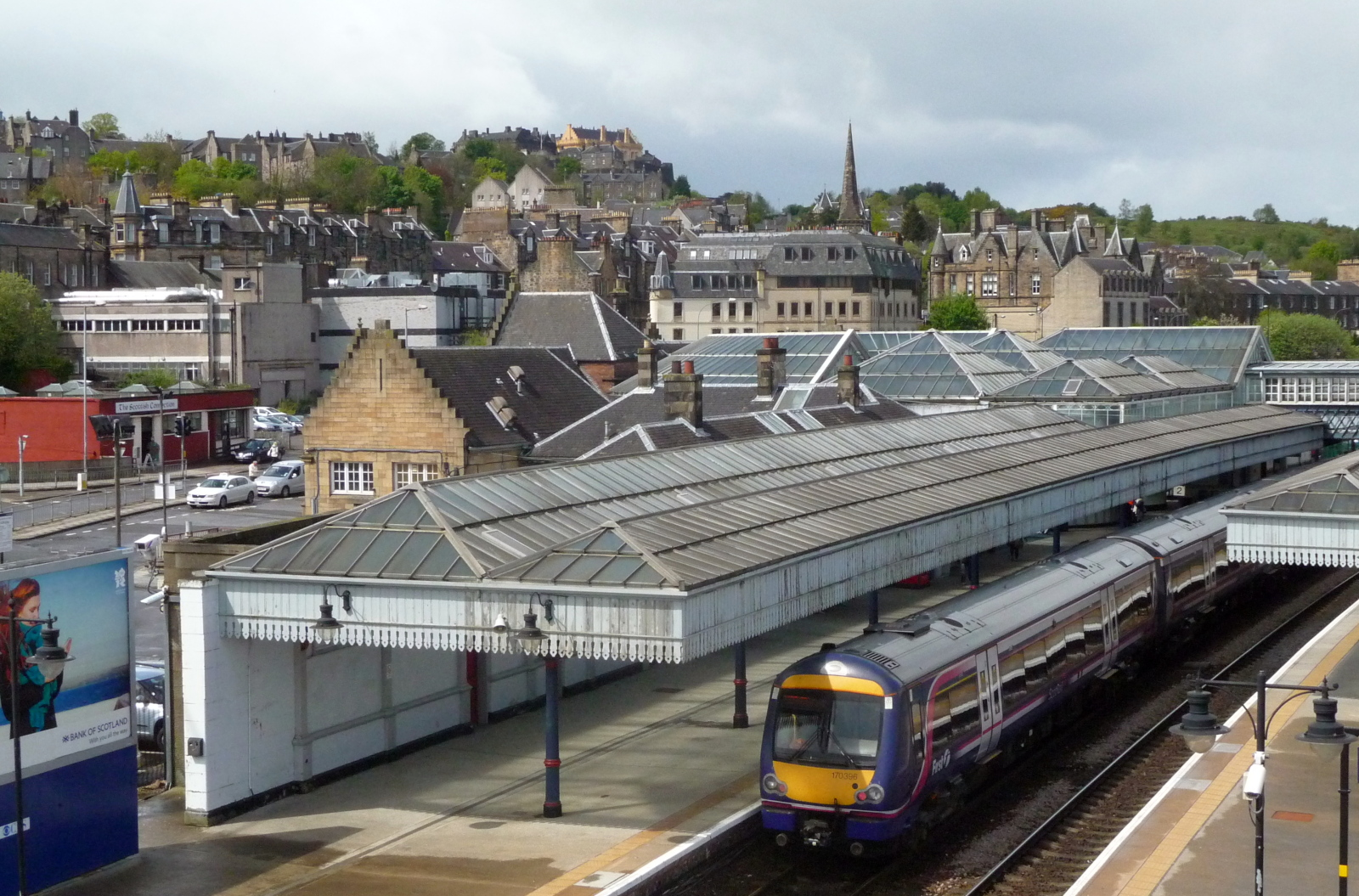
Stirling railway station

The City of Stirling is home to a large number of commuters but has fewer commuting to work in other areas, than travel into the city. About half of Scotland's population live within an hour's travel time of Stirling.

=== Bus ===
Local bus services to districts within the city are almost completely provided by buses operated by McGill's Midland Bluebird. The surrounding towns, like Bridge of Allan, Alloa, Falkirk and Glasgow via Cumbernauld have services from the bus station. Stagecoach South Scotland run a few services out of the city to surroundings towns/cities.

The city has 2 park and rides operated by Hunter Executive coaches on behalf of Stirling Council linking the 2 park & rides with the city centre.

Coaches to many Scottish towns and cities also run regularly. The main coach operators are Scottish Citylink and Ember.

=== Train ===
Stirling railway station connects Stirling to the railway network and sees services including inter-city rail services to Aberdeen, Dundee, Edinburgh Waverley, Inverness, Glasgow Queen Street, and London King's Cross. The station also provides regional services to Alloa, Bridge of Allan, Falkirk and Dunblane. Stirling Council provides some approximate journey times. Working lines include the Highland Main Line, the Edinburgh–Dunblane line and the Croy Line. The station formerly provided direct railway services to Callander and Oban, and to Loch Lomond, over very scenic lines, and a fast service to Dunfermline.

=== Road ===
Cities with motorway links to Stirling include Glasgow, via the M80 motorway past Cumbernauld, and Edinburgh, via the M9 motorway past Falkirk. To the north, the M9 provides access to Dunblane with easy links to Perth and further beyond the Central Belt.

=== Air ===
Stirling has no airport, but there are international airports at Glasgow and Edinburgh which can be reached within an hour. Light aircraft can be chartered at Cumbernauld Airport.

=== Boat ===
Stirling used to have steamboats which carried hundreds of passengers a day. There is currently no working port at Stirling but there are plans to develop the river and the harbour which might include links with towns on the Firth of Forth. Since the Forth is tidal at Stirling, development of pontoon style landing stages could potentially allow river taxis and tourist boats to operate during the summer.

== Media ==
Local radio stations are community based radio stations: CastleSound and Air3 Radio, which is a student-run station that broadcasts from the University of Stirling.

The Stirling News and Stirling Observer are the local newspapers in the city.

== Sports and recreation ==
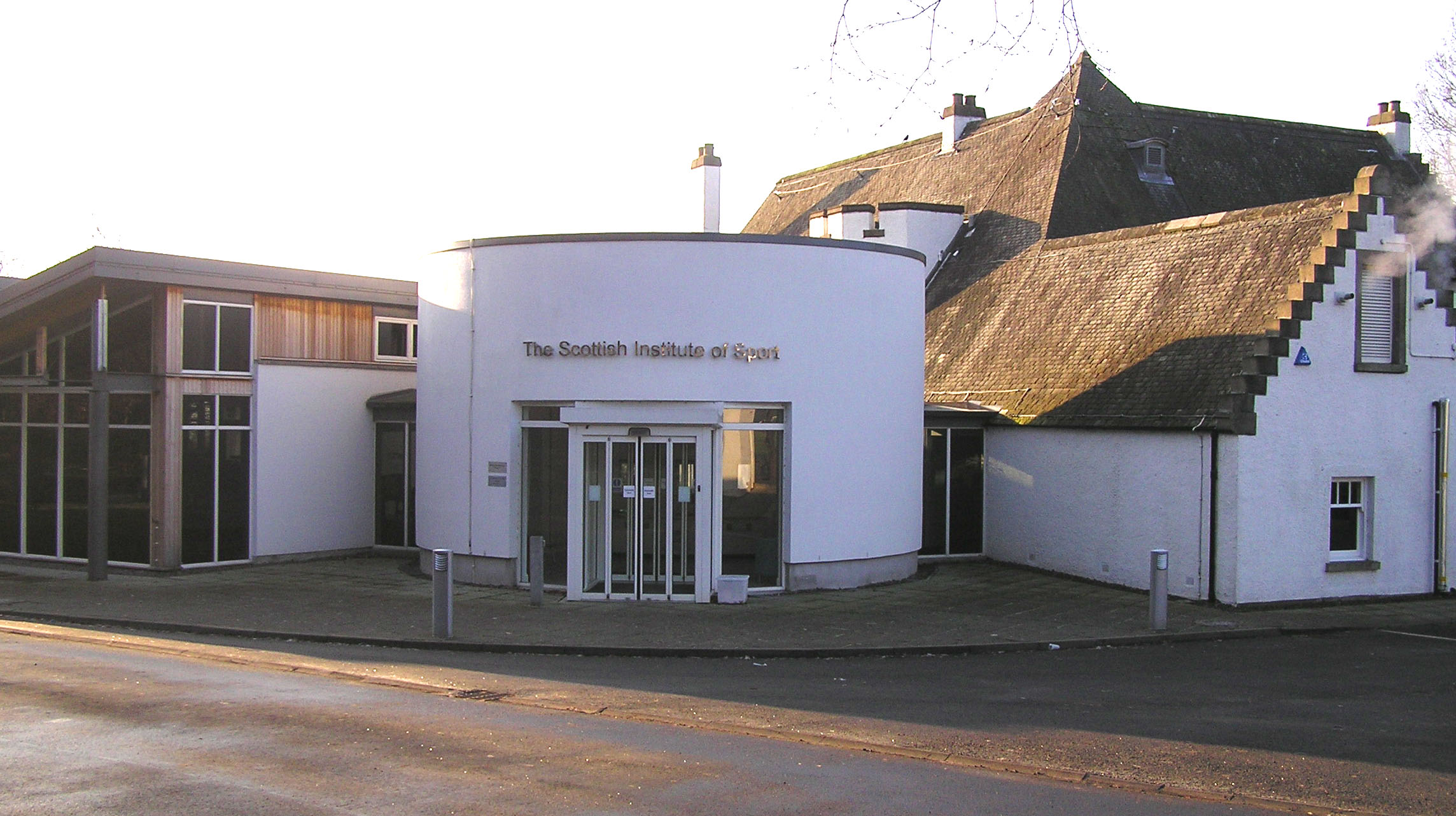
The headquarters of the Scottish Institute of Sport located on the campus at the University of Stirling.

Stirling is home to professional league teams in football, rugby and cricket. The first Stirling Scottish Marathon was held on 21 May 2017. The National Curling Academy is located in Stirling Sports Village. It was opened in 2017 by Eve Muirhead. They use facilities linked to The Peak. It was hoped this would increase the chances of British medals at events like the Winter Olympics and Paralympics.

The senior football team, Stirling Albion, play in the Scottish League Two at their home ground at Forthbank Stadium. In July 2010, the Stirling Albion Supporters' Trust successfully took over the running of the club buying out the long-serving chairman, Peter McKenzie, after 14 months of campaigning. This made Stirling Albion the first fully owned community club in the history of British football, after previous attempts made by Manchester United, Liverpool and Rangers. Stirling University L.F.C. are the premier women's football team. They play in the Scottish Women's Premier League. Their home ground is The Gannochy Sports Centre at University of Stirling. Scotland international footballers Billy Bremner, John Colquhoun, Duncan Ferguson, female footballer Frankie Brown and brothers Gary and Steven Caldwell were born in Stirling. So were rugby internationals Kenny Logan, Ally Hogg and Alison McGrandles, jockey Willie Carson, and cricketer Dougie Brown.

Stirling County currently play in rugby's Scottish Premiership Division One. Stirling Knights Basketball Team are based at the Peak at Forthbank beside Forthbank Stadium. The athletics team Central Athletic Club are based at the University of Stirling. The Stirling Wanderers Hockey Club moved to a brand new (international standard) pitch at Forthbank for season 2008–09.

Next to this pitch there is also the ground of Stirling County Cricket Club, whose pavilion captured an architectural award in June 2009, three years after its opening.

The University of Stirling is a major centre of sports training and education in Scotland. It was designated as Scotland's University for Sporting Excellence by the Scottish Government in 2008. The headquarters of the Scottish Institute of Sport is a purpose-built facility on the campus which opened in 2002. Also at the university is the Scottish National Swimming Academy, where Rio 2016, Olympic silver medalists and students at the university, Duncan Scott and Robbie Renwick trained. Commonwealth gold medalist Ross Murdoch, who also competed at Rio 2016, is a student at the university. The Gannochy National Tennis centre, which is seen as a tennis centre of excellence, was where Andy Murray and his brother Jamie Murray honed their skills as juniors. Gordon Reid, wheel chair Olympic gold medalist in 2016, was a tennis scholar at the university. The university men's and women's golf teams are consistently ranked among the best in Europe.

The university has a dedicated sports studies department, which is within the Faculty of Health Science and Sport, and is ranked amongst the best in the United Kingdom for its provision of sports facilities, with the maximum 5-star award, shared by 16 other universities in the UK. The University of Stirling also currently hosts the Scottish men's lacrosse champions. Stirling and its surrounding area has a number of 9- and 18-hole golf courses, the largest of which is the Stirling Golf Course, located in the Kings Park area of the city. The Peak, a new Sports Village, was opened in April 2009 to cater for a range of sporting activities.

In June 2014, Stirling became the home of Scottish cricket after an agreement between Stirling County Cricket Club, Cricket Scotland and Stirling Council. It is hoped that the redevelopment of the ground will start at end 2014 with the intention being to upgrade it to international match standards. Scotland will play the majority of their home international games at the ground, starting with the World T20 qualifiers in the summer of 2015. The development will see a new pavilion and indoor training facility built at New Williamfield, the home of Stirling County Cricket Club, with Cricket Scotland relocating its headquarters from the National Cricket Academy at Ravelston, Edinburgh.

== Education ==
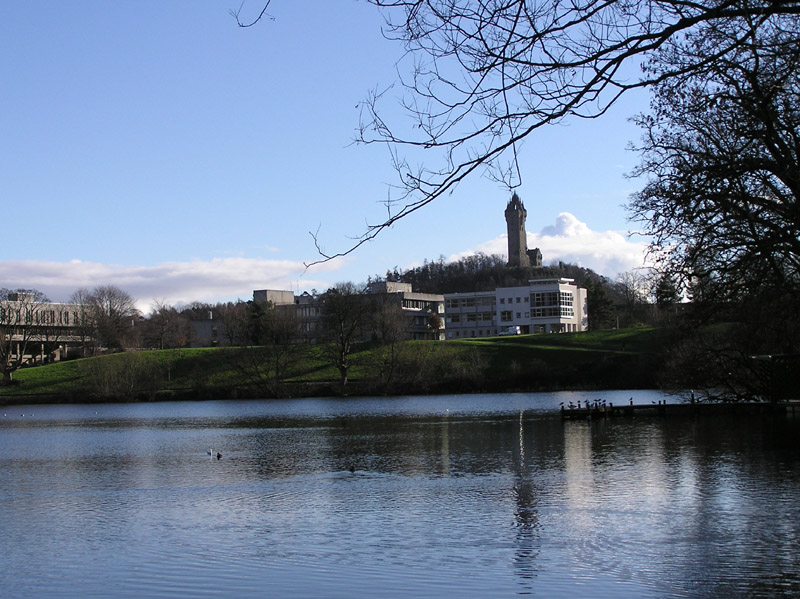
Looking out over Airthrey Loch on the main campus of The University of Stirling

The University of Stirling opened in 1967 on a greenfield site outside the town. In 2025 the university had 18,500 students globally, of whom over 11,000 are undergraduates and over 6,000 are postgraduates. There are over 140 nationalities represented on the university campus, with more than 30% of students being international. It has grown into a major research centre, with a large Innovation Park located immediately adjacent to the main university campus. Innovation Park has grown since its initiation in 1993, and is now home to 40 companies engaging in various forms of research and development. In January 2008 it was announced that students from Singapore would be able to gain degrees in retail from the University of Stirling in a tie-up with the country's Nanyang Polytechnic (NYP). Stirling is also home to part of the wider Forth Valley College which was formed on 1 August 2005 from the merger of Falkirk, Stirling and Clackmannan colleges.

There are four main high schools in Stirling itself – Stirling High School, with a school roll of 964 pupils, Wallace High School with 958 pupils, St Modan's High School with 912 pupils, and Bannockburn High School in Broomridge with 752 pupils. All the city's secondary school premises have been redeveloped as a result of a Public-private partnership scheme. Stirling also has a Gaelic-medium unit situated in the city's Riverside Primary School which teaches pupils from across Stirling and Clackmannanshire through the medium of Scottish Gaelic. Queen Victoria School, an agency of the Ministry of Defence, is in Dunblane, near Stirling.

== Twinned cities ==
- Villeneuve d'Ascq, France
- Dunedin, Florida, United States
- Óbuda, Hungary
- Summerside, Prince Edward Island, Canada
- Kecioren, Turkey

== Notable residents ==
- Dorothy Angus (1891–1979), embroidery artist
- Frank and Harold Barnwell, pilots and aircraft designers
- Frank Beattie (1933–2009), footballer
- Alexander Beith (1799–1891), moderator of the General Assembly of the Free Church of Scotland
- Billy Bremner (1942–1997), former Leeds and Internationalist footballer
- Sir Henry Campbell-Bannerman, former prime minister
- Gary Caldwell (born 1982), former Scotland International footballer and manager
- Steven Caldwell (born 1980), footballer
- Willie Carson (born 1942), jockey
- Winifred Christie (1882–1965), pianist
- Duncan Ferguson (born 1971), footballer
- Robert Garnock (c.1660 – 1681), covenanter, hanged in Edinburgh
- Sam Gellaitry (born 1997), musician
- John Grierson (1898–1972), documentary-film pioneer
- James Guthrie (c.1612 – 1661), minister and protester
- Michael Hay, lawyer
- Gail Honeyman, novelist
- King James VI of Scotland, former resident
- Stephen Kingsley, footballer
- John Joseph Jolly Kyle, pioneer chemist
- Christian Maclagan, Sunday-school teacher, antiquarian, early archaeologist and suffragist
- Bill Macnaught, National Librarian of New Zealand, 2011–2020
- Mary, Queen of Scots, former resident
- Mirren Mack, actress
- Muir Mathieson, film-music composer
- Lauren Mayberry, musician
- John McAleese, team leader during the SAS assault on the Iranian embassy in May 1980
- Norman McLaren, animation pioneer
- Neil Oliver, television presenter
- John Paton, Victoria Cross recipient
- Finn Russell, professional rugby union player
- Patrick Simson, minister respected by James VI
- Anna Sloan, Olympic curler, bronze medalists at the 2014 Winter Olympics
- Kirsty Young, television presenter

== Freedom of the City ==
The following people and military units have received the Freedom of the City of Stirling.

=== Individuals ===
- George, Duke of York: 29 August 1928
- Elizabeth, Duchess of York: 29 August 1928
- Elizabeth, Duchess of Edinburgh: 1948
- Lieutenant Colonel Francis William Saunders: 17 July 2008
- Irvin Iffla: 3 April 2009
- Sir Andrew Murray: 22 April 2014

=== Military units ===
- The Argyll and Sutherland Highlanders: 1947
- 43 Squadron RAF: 2005
- The Royal Regiment of Scotland: 10 March 2012

== See also ==
- Black Bond
- Lecropt
- List of places in Stirling (district)
- List of places in Scotland
- List of town defences in Scotland
