= Stirling Old Bridge =

Bridge in the Stirling, Scotland

Old Bridge
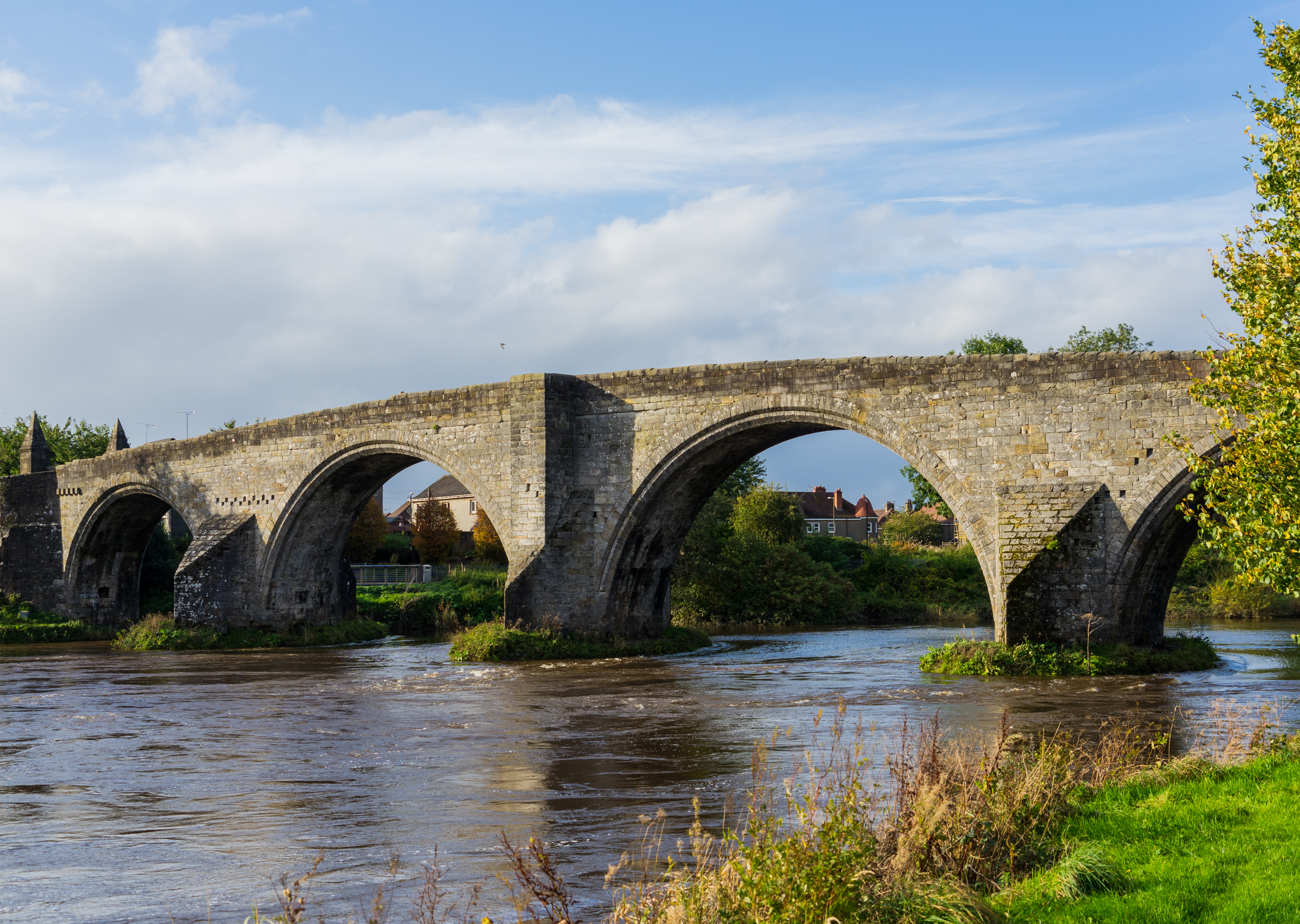
- Coordinates: 56°7′43.03″N 3°56′12.78″W
- Crosses: River Forth
- Locale: Stirling

Characteristics
- Material: Stone
- Total length: 268 feet (82 m)
- No. of spans: 4

History
- Construction end: c. 1500

Scheduled monument
- Official name: Stirling Old Bridge
- Designated: 31 December 1921
- Reference no.: SM90290

Location
- Interactive map of Old Bridge

Stirling Old Bridge is a stone bridge which crosses the River Forth. For over 300 years it provided the lowest crossing point of the Forth and so had strategic importance.

== History ==
The stone bridge was constructed on rubble foundations around 1500 and replaced earlier wooden bridges, including that on which the Battle of Stirling Bridge was fought.

The bridge originally had arches at either end and a defensive gate at the end nearer the burgh. Tolls were levied on goods being taken across the bridge.

In December 1745, Brigadier-General William Blakeney, the lieutenant governor of Stirling Castle, had one of the bridge arches destroyed to hinder the movement of the Jacobite Army. The destroyed arch was rebuilt in 1749.

In May 1833 the adjacent new road bridge was opened to traffic and the Old Bridge was closed to wheeled traffic.

The bridge was designated as a scheduled monument in 1921.

== See also ==
- List of bridges in Scotland
