= Alloa Railway =

Former railway line in Scotland

The Alloa Railway was intended to bridge the River Forth linking Alloa with the south without using a ferry.

== History ==
Alloa Railway Act 1879
- Act of Parliament
- Parliament of the United Kingdom
- Long title: An Act for making a Railway from the South Alloa Branch of the Caledonian Railway to Alloa; and for other purposes.
- Citation: 42 & 43 Vict. c. ccxiv

Dates
- Royal assent: 11 August 1879

Text of statute as originally enacted

The railway was authorised by the Alloa Railway Act 1879 (42 & 43 Vict. c. ccxiv) on 11 August 1879, it started from a new junction, Dunmore Junction, on the South Alloa branch of the Scottish Central Section of the Caledonian Railway (CR) located approximately 3 miles (4.8 km) north of Alloa Junction. It was 3 miles (4.8 km) long, with a swing bridge over River Forth, and terminated at a piece of vacant ground in the town of Alloa, on the west side of the private road leading from Craigward Place to Bass Crest Brewery, about 230 metres short of the final point of termination. (Note: The enabling act for the Alloa Railway was: "Local Act, 42 & 43 Victoria I, c. ccxiv:An Act for making a Railway from the South Alloa Branch of the Caledonian Railway to Alloa; and for other purposes". UK Parliamentary Archives. 1879.)

From the beginning the CR supported the railway financially, they entered into agreements for the maintenance, management and working of the railway, and had those arrangements approved by the Caledonian Railway (Additional Powers) Act 1880 (43 & 44 Vict. c. clxxxviii). (Note: The act formalising the arrangements between the Alloa Railway and the CR was: "Local Act, 43 & 44 Victoria I, c. clxxxviii:An Act for enabling the Caledonian Railway Company to make Railways and other Works, acquire Lands, and abandon portions of Works in the counties of Lanark, Renfrew, and Edinburgh; to maintain, work, and contribute to the Alloa Railway; to establish an Accident and Life Insurance Fund for their servants, and to raise additional Money; for extending the authorised periods for completion of certain Railways in Lanarkshire, and acquisition of Lands in connexion therewith, and sale of superfluous Lands; and for other purposes". UK Parliamentary Archives. 1880.) In 1884 the CR absorbed the Alloa Railway before the line had been completed. The Caledonian Railway (No. 1) Act 1884 (47 & 48 Vict. c. cxxix), which authorised the absorption of the Alloa Railway, also provided for an extension of one furlong one chain and eleven yards (231 metres) from the planned terminus in Alloa so that the line now terminated on the western side of Glasshouse Loan. (Note: The CR absorbed the Alloa Railway with effect from 1 September 1884 under the authority of a further act: "Local Act, 47 & 48 Victoria I, c. cxxix:An Act for enabling the Caledonian Railway Company to construct certain Railways and other Works in the Counties of Renfrew, Forfar, Stirling, and Clackmannan, to acquire and complete the Alloa Railway, and to take in lease the Moffat Railway; for extending the time for completing the Alloa Railway; for dissolving the Alloa Railway Company; for abandoning the Larbert and Grangemouth Connecting Lines of the Caledonian Railway Company, and confirming an agreement between that Company and the North British Railway Company with respect to the use of the Stirlingshire Midland Junction and Grangemouth Railways and other matters; and for other purposes". UK Parliamentary Archives. 1884.)

== Alloa Swing Bridge ==
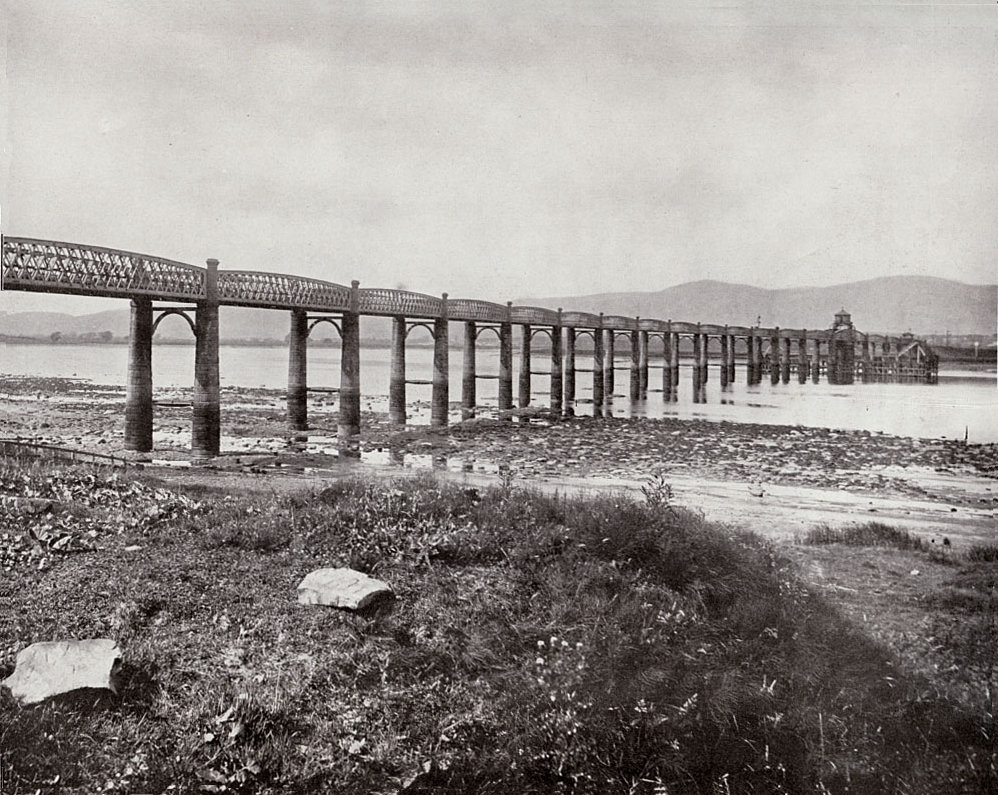
Alloa Viaduct and Swing Bridge

The major civil engineering construction on the line was the Alloa Swing Bridge, this was a railway swing bridge across the River Forth. The structure was in use until 1968 and was demolished in 1971.

== North British Railway connecting line ==
The connecting line between Alloa West junction and Longcarse junction (called the Alloa Junction Loop on OS maps) belonged to the North British Railway (NBR) and as such it was authorised by a different act of Parliament, the North British Railway Act 1883 (46 & 47 Vict. c. lxviii). This act was also used to confirm the reciprocal running powers agreement between the CR and the NBR. The NBR gave the CR access to its station in Alloa via the Alloa Junction Loop and the section of the line from there to Alloa station, they also agreed to contribute towards the doubling of the rest of the line, in exchange the CR gave the NBR access to the Alloa Railway and its former Scottish Central Line as far as the junction with the NBR at Greenhill. (Note: The act authorising the NBR connecting line and confirming the running powers agreement was: "Local Act, 46 & 47 Victoria I, c. lxviii:An Act to authorise a Railway in Alloa Parish from the North British Railway to the Alloa Railway; to confirm an agreement as to running powers, &c.; to extend to ships not freighted the obligation of the North British Railway Company to tow Ships freighted under the Tay Viaduct; and for other purposes". UK Parliamentary Archives. 1883.)

== Alloa stations ==
To accommodate the CR at its Alloa station the NBR firstly opened a new goods station on 21 September 1885 to the east of Glasshouse Loan on the Harbour branch in order to create some space at the passenger station, it also undertook some alterations to the station itself prior to a major rebuilding scheduled for the following few years.

The CR opened its own goods station on the site mentioned above, on the western side of Glasshouse Loan, directly opposite the NBR one. The CR set up its own passenger booking office at Alloa station, in what had formerly been the parcel office.

== Openings ==
The Caledonian line and the North British connecting line both opened on 1 October 1885, there were no stations opened on the line at this time.

The Edinburgh Evening News reported the first train:

To-day the new Alloa Railway and Bridge were opened for traffic by the Caledonian and North British Railway Companies. The first train which left Alloa N.B. station for the new bridge line was a Caledonian one, consisting of three new carriages having all the latest improvements and fitted with gas tanks, so that the gas light will be supplied in place of the old oil lamps. A large number of people witnessed the departure of the train, which had about a dozen passengers, most of whom intended going to Larbert junction and return with the following train. Mr Gillespie, Perth, the district superintendent accompanied the train. The N.B. Company have running powers over this new line which considerably shortens the distance to Glasgow, the time occupied in the run between Alloa and Glasgow being now one hour.

Throsk station opened to the south of the swing bridge in 1890.

== Operations ==
The NBR made full use of the running powers, which gave it a viable route from Perth to Glasgow avoiding the Caledonian, except where it had running powers (between Perth and Hilton Junction and over the Alloa bridge section). Express passenger and goods services were brought over the line. Use of the route by NBR goods trains was especially heavy between the opening of the (Second) Tay Bridge and the opening of the Forth Bridge, for services from Dundee southwards.

During the First World war Bandeath Munitions Depot was established on the peninsula to the west of the swing bridge, it had rail access from a junction to the south of the bridge, between it and Throsk station.

British Railways added a second connection from Longcarse Junction to Alloa Marshalling Yard (parallel with the S&D line) in 1957. This made the turntable at Alloa passenger station redundant.

== Closure ==
The line closed in stages, firstly the passenger service was withdrawn on 29 January 1968. The section from Longcarse Junction to the junction for the RNAD at Throsk, including the swing bridge, closed completely on 6 May 1968. The line may have been closed to all traffic but it was retained until the bridge was fixed in the open position on 18 May 1970, at this time it finally closed together with the section between Longcarse Junction and Alloa West Junction. The Alloa Swing Bridge was mostly demolished on 8 February 1971, the piers remain as wildlife havens sheltering cormorants. Then on 1 April 1978 the remaining southerly section from Throsk to Alloa Junction closed.
