= Alloa Swing Bridge =

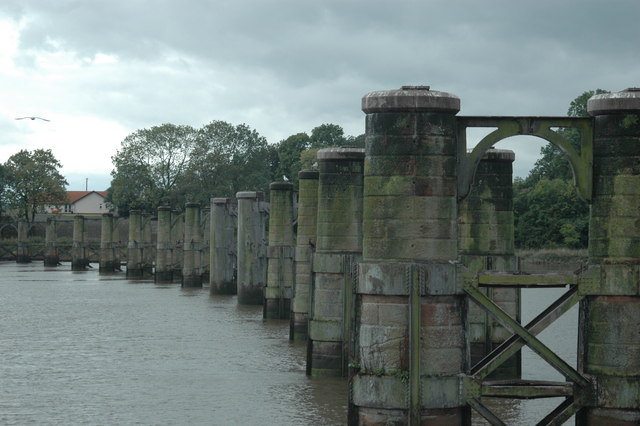
- Piers of the bridge in 2006
- Coordinates: 56.101°N 3.831°W
- Carries: Rail traffic
- Crosses: River Forth
- Locale: Throsk to Alloa, United Kingdom

Characteristics
- Design: Swing bridge

History
- Opened: 1885
- Closed: 1968

Location
- Interactive map of Alloa Swing Bridge

The Alloa Swing Bridge was a railway swing bridge across the River Forth that connected Throsk and Alloa as part of the Alloa Railway. The structure was in use from 1885 until 1968.

== History ==
The Alloa Railway obtained authority through an Act of Parliament on 11 August 1879 to open a section of line linking the South Alloa Branch of the Scottish Central Railway to Alloa.

The new line was also connected to the North British Railway and both opened on 1 October 1885. The rail line was double track except for the bridge crossing, which was single track. The swing bridge design was necessary to allow the passage of shipping up and downstream at a time when Stirling was still an active port.

== Design and construction ==
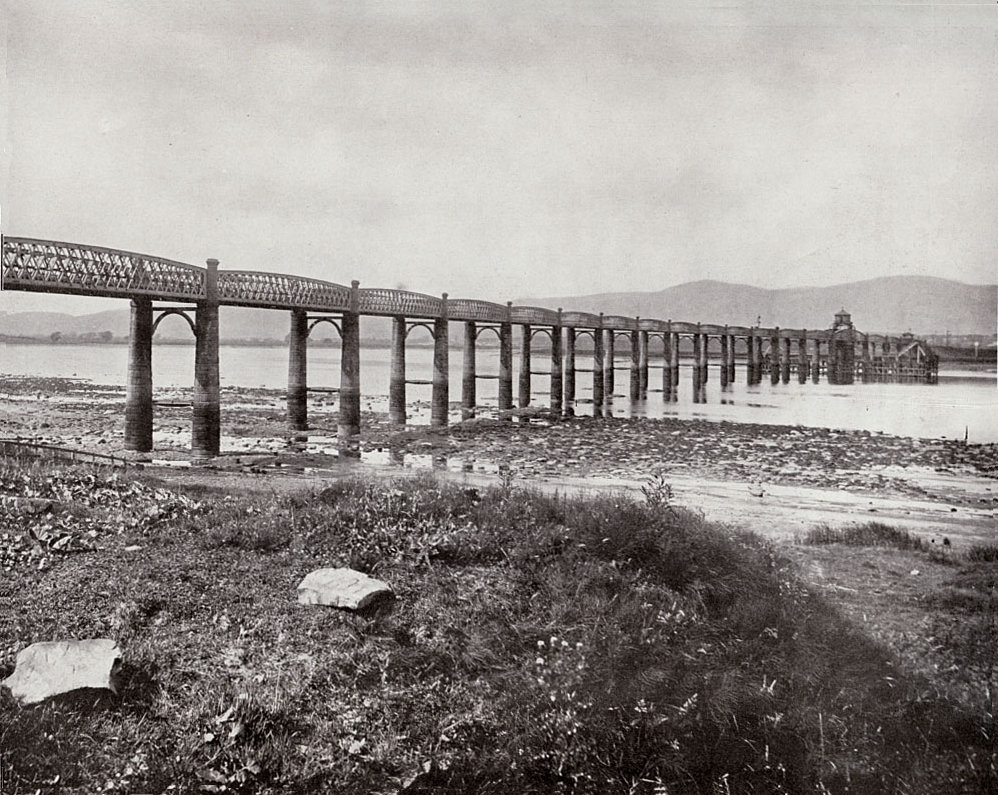
Alloa Viaduct and Swing Bridge

The bridge was designed by the consulting civil engineers, Crouch and Hogg, and built by contractors Watt and Wilson, both of Glasgow. The bridge was designed as a 492 metre long (1,615 feet), multi-span, wrought-iron, bow-girder structure, with a horizontal curvature of 865 metres (43 chains). The span of the swing bridge was 44 metres, providing a clear opening of 19 metres for river vessels on each side of a steam-powered, rotating, central pier that housed a cabin structure to allow operation of the steam engine. The central pier of the rotating span was protected by a timber cutwater that projected 43 metres up and down river. When the swing bridge was opened for river traffic, the ends of the rotating span were supported by structures at each end of the cutwater. The deck of the bridge was at a level of 7 metres above high water level and was supported on piers, each consisting of two stone columns connected by ironwork at top and base. Several aerial and deck level photographs of the bridge that illustrate the layout of the structure are available from the Royal Commission on the Ancient and Historical Monuments of Scotland.

== Incidents during operation ==
The bridge was damaged by collisions on at least three occasions. In 1899, gales drove a sailing ship against one of the piers. In October 1904, a schooner also collided with one of the piers as it passed through the swing span, displacing some girders. Rail traffic was suspended until June 1905. In August 1920, H.M.S. Mallard, which was to be broken up at Alloa, broke free from its moorings and crashed into the bridge. The damage was serious enough to close the bridge to rail traffic until March 1921. As a result of these incidents, three stone piers were replaced by cast iron ones and additional cross-bracing was added to all piers.

== Decline, closure and demolition ==
Throughout its existence the bridge had carried passenger and freight traffic, but both gradually declined and in the 1960s, the passenger service was replaced by a four-wheeled railbus. Trains continued to bring coal to the swing bridge engine house until this was fixed in the open position for river traffic in May 1970. The connecting lines and the deck were dismantled in 1971, leaving only the piers and abutments, which remain as of 2021.
