= Throsk =

Coordinates: 56.0979°N 3.8502°W

Throsk: Scottish Gaelic: Badan Deathach
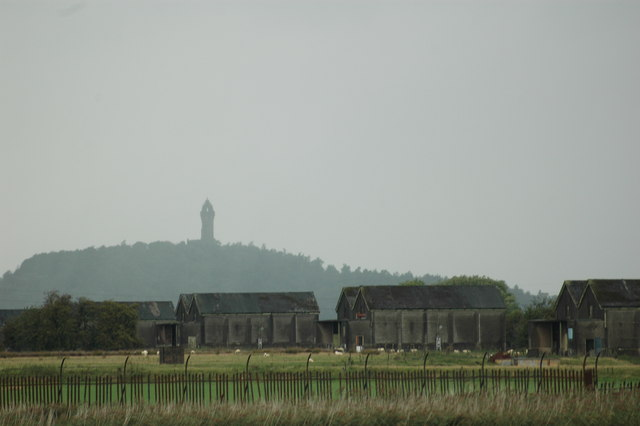
- Storage bunkers at the Bandeath naval depot with the Wallace Monument beyond in the distance

- Location within the Stirling council area
- OS grid reference: NS849909
- Civil parish: St. Ninians
- Council area: Stirling
- Lieutenancy area: Stirling and Falkirk
- Country: Scotland
- Sovereign state: United Kingdom
- Post town: STIRLING
- Postcode district: FK7
- Dialling code: 01786
- Police: Scotland
- Fire: Scottish
- Ambulance: Scottish
- UK Parliament: Stirling and Strathallan
- Scottish Parliament: Stirling

Throsk (In Scottish Gaelic: Badan Deathach, meaning the thicket among the mist) is a village in the Stirling council area of Scotland. It lies on the A905 road east of Fallin close to the River Forth. The United Kingdom Census 2001 recorded the population as 231.

Throsk was formerly the site of the Royal Navy's Bandeath armaments depot. This closed in 1978 and now serves as an industrial estate owned by the local council. Many of the original munitions storage bunkers remain in situ as does a loading crane beside the River Forth.

There was a rail bridge between Throsk and Alloa sometime called the Alloa Swing Bridge of which some video footage survives.

== See also ==
- Throsk railway station
