= Forth and Cart Canal =

Canal in West Dunbartonshire, Scotland (1836–1893)

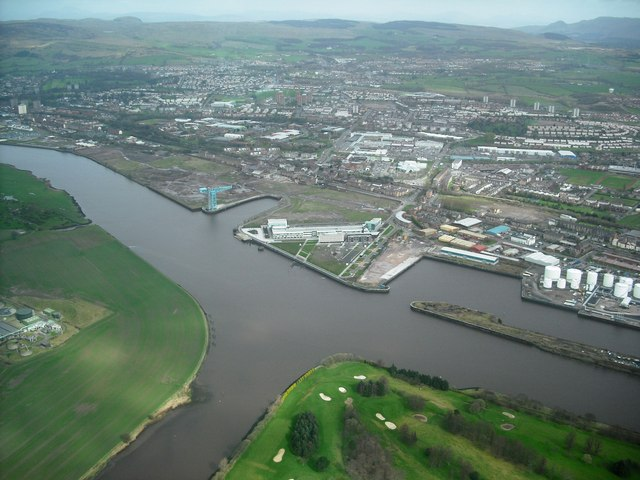
- The confluence of the rivers Cart and Clyde. The canal followed the course of the road to the east of Clydebank College, in the centre foreground.
- Interactive map of Forth and Cart Canal

Specifications
- Maximum boat length: 67 ft 0 in (20.42 m)
- Maximum boat beam: 15 ft 0 in (4.57 m)
- Locks: 3
- Status: destroyed

History
- Date of act: 1836
- Date of first use: 1840
- Date closed: 1893

Geography
- Connects to: Forth and Clyde Canal, River Clyde

The Forth and Cart Canal was a short 1/2-mile (800-metre) link canal which provided a short cut between the Forth and Clyde Canal, at Whitecrook, and the River Clyde, opposite the mouth of the River Cart. It was intended to provide a transport link between the town of Paisley, the Firth of Forth and Port Dundas, Glasgow, without having to go via Bowling, some 7 miles (11 kilometres) downstream on the Clyde. The Forth and Cart Canal was closed in 1893. Railway works destroyed most of it soon afterwards.

== The Cart navigation ==
An act of Parliament obtained in 1753 authorised improvements to the White Cart Water, to make it navigable, and so assist the developing cotton industry in Paisley. The works included making the channel straighter and deeper. A new road bridge had been built at Inchinnan in 1787, after which Paisley Town Council obtained a second act of Parliament, to authorise the construction of a new navigable cut, which would pass under the Turn Pike road (now the A8). Work started on 23 August 1787, and was expected to be completed within a year. With the anticipated building of the Forth and Cart Canal, further work was carried out in 1835 to improve the harbour facilities at Paisley. There were plans to make it much deeper and wider in the 1880s, so that ocean-going ships could reach Paisley, but although the work was declared complete on 25 May 1891, the first ship to attempt to use the river ran aground on the opening day, and the scheme was later abandoned.

The River Cart and the White Cart Water provided a navigable waterway between the River Clyde and the centre of Paisley.

== The Forth and Cart Canal ==
The idea of a direct connection between the Cart Navigation and the Forth and Clyde Canal had first been suggested by Hugh Baird in 1799, but no further action had been taken. When the Forth and Cart Canal was promoted in the 1830s, it essentially revived Baird's plan, in the hope that it would provide a better route between Paisley and the Firth of Forth than the alternative which went via Port Eglinton and Port Dundas. Port Dundas was on the north bank of the Clyde, at the end of the Glasgow Branch of the Forth and Clyde Canal, where it joined the Monkland Canal, while Port Eglinton was only a short distance away on the south bank, and was the terminus of the Glasgow, Paisley and Johnstone Canal. There was no waterway between them and so goods had to be transferred by road.

It was also expected that coal from Coatbridge would reach Paisley via the Monkland Canal, the Forth and Clyde, the proposed new canal and the Cart Navigation. It would save water on the Forth and Clyde, as smaller boats could pass down the link, rather than using the larger locks to the west, where the Forth and Clyde joined the River Clyde.

Forth and Cart Junction Canal Act 1836
- Act of Parliament
- Parliament of the United Kingdom
- Long title: An Act to make and maintain a Canal in the County of Dumbarton from the Forth and Clyde Canal to the River of Clyde opposite to the River of Cart.
- Citation: 6 & 7 Will. 4. c. li
- Territorial extent: United Kingdom

Dates
- Royal assent: 20 May 1836
- Commencement: 20 May 1836 (Note: The Acts of Parliament (Commencement) Act 1793.)

Other legislation
- Relates to: Forth and Clyde Navigation Act 1814; Forth and Clyde Navigation Act 1820; Forth and Clyde Navigation Act 1836

Text of statute as originally enacted

The Forth and Cart canal was authorised by an act of Parliament, the Forth and Cart Junction Canal Act 1836 (6 & 7 Will. 4. c. li), in May 1836 and was completed in 1840. It joined the River Clyde almost opposite the mouth of the River Cart and joined the Forth and Clyde Canal at Whitecrook. It had three locks which were 67 feet (20 metres) long and 15 feet (4.6 metres) wide, limiting vessels to that size.

Although the Forth and Clyde Canal obtained an act of Parliament to allow it to take over the Forth and Cart in 1842, the transfer did not take place for another 13 years. By then, revenue was only £325 per year, and costs, which included interest on the debts from the construction of the canal, exceeded this amount by £17. The canal was in a poor state, and it was estimated that £3,100 needed to be spent on it to return it to good order. The annual traffic was around 40,000 tons, as the railways now supplied the coal that Paisley used. The Forth and Clyde estimated that they made £739 per year from trade which passed from the Forth and Cart to their canal, and therefore offered to buy it for £6,400. If traffic exceeded 90,000 tons, the original proprietors would receive an extra penny (0.4p) per ton. Although the payment would not clear the debts, and the likelihood of traffic increasing sufficiently to generate the tonnage payments was slight, the committee had little option but to accept. It was taken over by the Forth and Clyde Canal in 1855; and, together with the Forth and Clyde Canal and the Monkland Canal, was taken over by the Caledonian Railway in 1867. The Forth and Cart Canal was closed in 1893 as it was unprofitable.

== Remains of the canal ==
The closure of the canal provided an opportunity for the Glasgow - Clydebank railway, which brought workers from Glasgow to the adjacent Thompson shipyard, to extend the line to Dalmuir. This line opened in 1896, and destroyed the first section of the canal. By 1897, there was a small section of canal at the northern end, which ended where a railway siding of the Glasgow, Yoker and Clydebank Railway crossed it. It had been shortened by the construction of another railway siding by 1919, although the towpath bridge was still evident. By 1937, there was no trace of the north end, as an employment exchange had been built over it. At the south end, the canal was truncated just below the first lock, where the Lanarkshire and Dunbartonshire Railway crossed it. It remained in this state in 1919, but by 1939 had been reduced by half. A small part of it was still evident in 1985, but is no longer so.

Despite its having been closed for over 100 years, the Environmental Statement for the construction on a new junction on the M8 motorway noted that the course of the canal was still clearly visible to the eastern edge of the shipyard site, and concluded that much of it probably still existed. A subsequent planning application for the development of the shipyard site stated that although it had been intended to reinstate a short section of the canal as a water feature, investigation had shown that there were no substantial remains of the canal left, and the planning restrictions that protected the line of the canal were rescinded.

== Locks ==
There were three locks on the Forth and Cart Canal:

- a single lock, and
- a pair of staircase locks.

The total rise was 30 feet (9 metres).

== Points of interest ==
Point	Coordinates (Links to map resources)	OS Grid Ref	Notes
Junction with Forth and Clyde Canal	55.9022°N 4.3993°W	NS500702	
Single lock	55.8987°N 4.4014°W	NS499698	
Staircase lock	55.8972°N 4.4023°W	NS498697	
Junction with River Clyde	55.8936°N 4.4039°W	NS497693	

== Bibliography ==
- Cumberlidge, Jane (2009). Inland Waterways of Great Britain (8th ed.). Imray Laurie Norie and Wilson. ISBN 978-1-84623-010-3.
- Lindsay, Jean (1968). The Canals of Scotland. Newton Abbott: David & Charles. ISBN 978-0-7153-4240-4.
