= Stockingfield Junction =

Canal junction in Glasgow, Scotland

Coordinates: 55°53′33″N 4°17′10″W

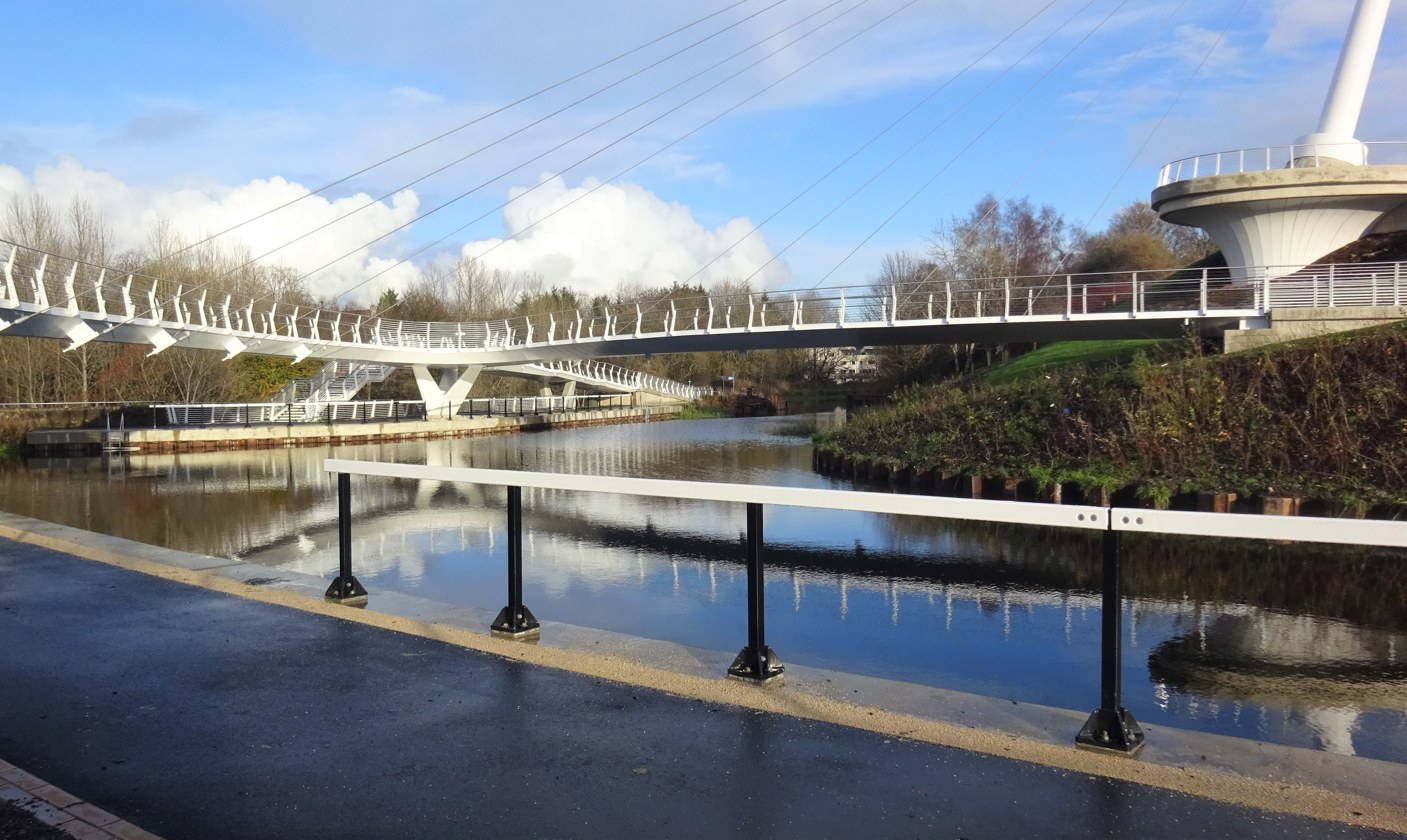
- Stockingfield Junction looking towards Port Dundas in 2022
- Interactive map of Stockingfield Junction

Specifications
- Status: Active
- Navigation authority: Forth and Clyde Canal

History
- Date completed: 1777
- Date closed: 1963
- Date restored: 2022

Stockingfield Junction is a canal junction which lies between Maryhill and Ruchill in Glasgow, Scotland. It opened in 1777, and closed in 1963, followed by restoration and a re-opening in 2022. At first a terminus it formed the junction for the Port Dundas branch off the Forth and Clyde Canal main line from 1777.

== History ==
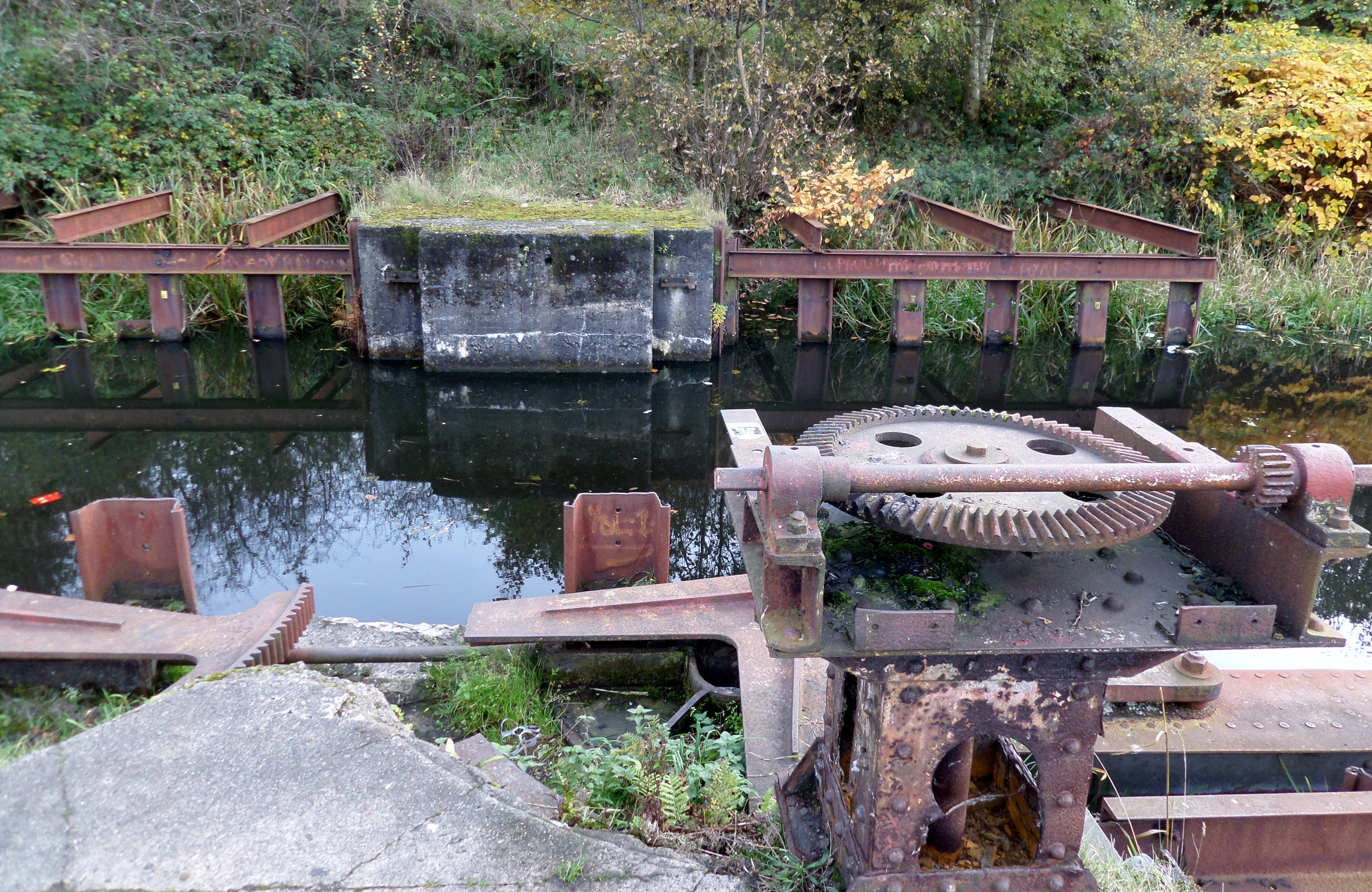
The Stockingfield Narrows 'Safety or Stop Gates'.

The canal from Edinburgh built by John Smeaton first reached Stockingfield in 1775 and due to the lack of funds work halted for two years and Stockingfield Basin and wharf became the terminus of the canal. The canal was filled with water, opening for the transport of goods traffic on 10 November 1775. The branch was completed to Hamiltonhill Basin by November 1777 and to Port Dundas by 1779 upon which date the main line to Bowling was also opened and Stockingfield's status as a junction was completed. The construction of the aqueduct seems to have obliterated the site of the original canal basin and wharf.

Later survey maps of the 19th century show a new building called the Lochburn Road House standing above Stockingfield House on the canal towpath close to the floating bridge that seems to have been used by canal staff involved in the 'opening and closing' of the bridge in relation to the requirements of passing canal traffic. It was demolished by the British Waterways Board in 1958.

=== The Floating Bridge ===
A floating bridge at Stockingfield aqueduct once made it possible for the horses pulling the barges to easily and quickly cross over from the 'main line' towpath to the 'branch line' and Bowling towpaths.

=== The Safety Gates ===
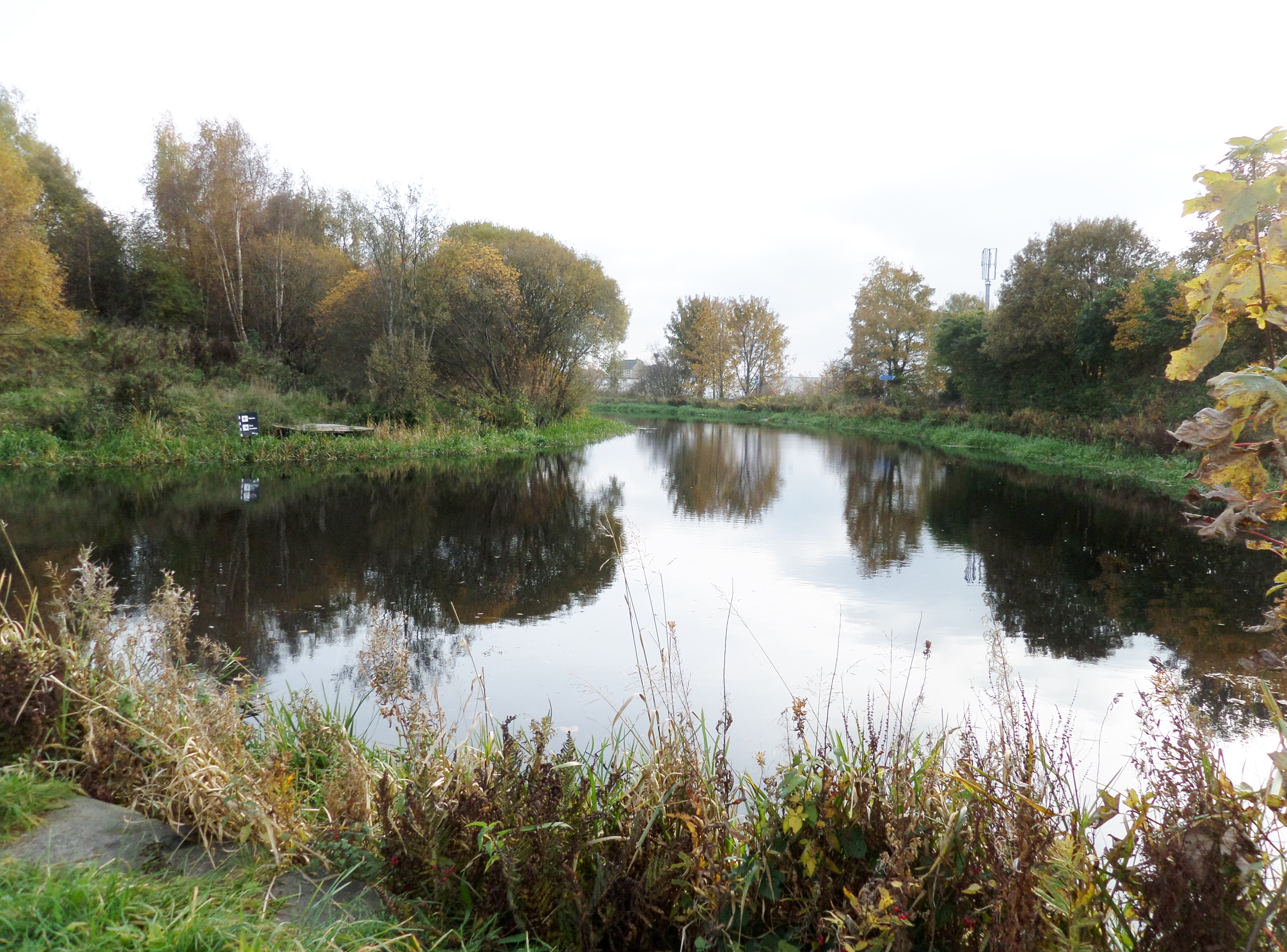
Stockingfield Junction in 2016

In 1942 two massive steel safety gates were constructed on the Edinburgh side of Stockingfield Junction at what is known as the Stockingfield Narrows. The purpose of these two hand cranked steel gates was to hold back the waters of the Forth and Clyde Canal to prevent serious flooding in Glasgow in the event of bombing destroying the Stockingfield Aqueduct. A second set of safety or stop locks were also installed in World War II at Firhill and form the Firhill Road Narrows on the Glasgow Branch. and a third set were built at the Craighall Road Narrows near Spiers Wharf. The nearest lock on the Edinburgh main line that could control the water loss after a breach is 17 miles (27 kilometres) away at Wyndford, Lock 20, whilst the Maryhill Locks 21 to 25 are close by.

=== Stockingfield or Lochburn Road Aqueduct ===
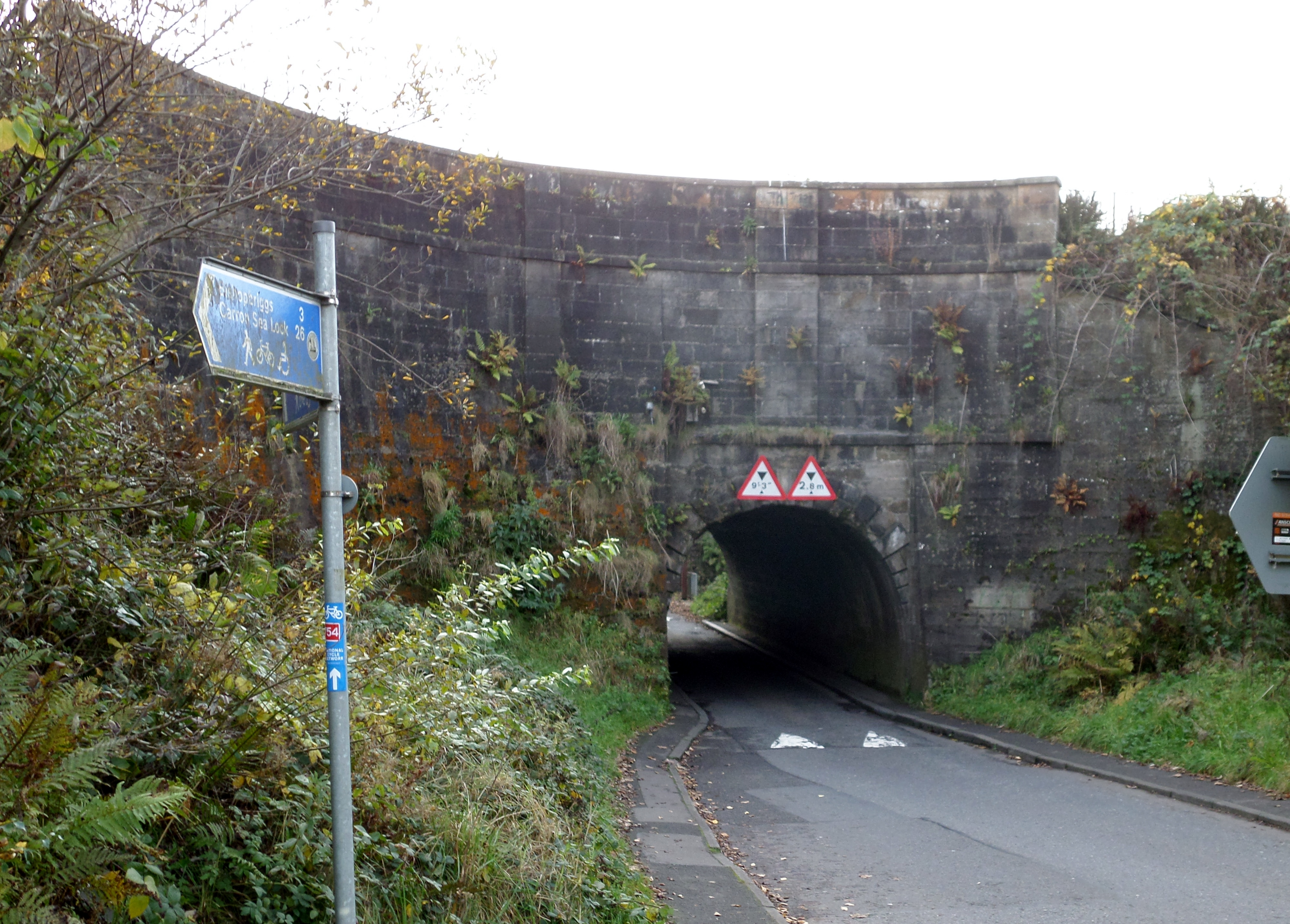
Stockingfield or Lochburn Road Aqueduct.

Designed in the 1780s by Robert Whitworth and built between 1784 and 1790 the original Stockingfield Aqueduct (NS57126899) and road tunnel arch survive, carrying the main line of the canal over Lochburn Road. At the end of the nineteenth century a ferry operated here for the convenience of pedestrians wishing to cross over to the other towpath to Bowling or to Port Dundas. A floating bridge had also existed here to allow easy access of horses and pedestrians to the towpath on the other side of the canal junction.

=== Stockingfield Bridge ===
A permanent, three way footbridge suspended from the outstretched arms of a 'Big Man' designed by sculptor Andy Scott was proposed for installation at Stockingfield Junction in the 2000s before being shelved then revived in mid-2010s, but did not proceed due to economic circumstances. A cheaper, less ambitious crossing on the site, named simply Stockingfield Bridge, was completed in 2022 to connect the communities of Ruchill, Gilshochill and central Maryhill and improve the canal path network.

== Location ==
The small estate of Stockingfield gave its name to the canal junction. The Stockingfield Junction lies four locks, 20 miles 4 furlongs (33.0 kilometres) east of the Union Canal Junction near the Falkirk Wheel. 9 miles 4 furlongs (15.3 kilometres) and twenty locks west is the Clyde Canal Junction, where the Forth and Clyde Canal reaches the Clyde Estuary at Bowling. Two locks and 2 miles 6 1/2 furlongs (4.5 kilometres) south is the Port Dundas Basin, which was also the terminus of the Monkland Canal.

The Stockingfield Narrows are the pair of 'safety or stop gates' built in 1942 to reduce flooding if German bombing hit the Stockingfield or Lochburn Aqueduct No 14.

== See also ==
- History of the British canal system

=== References ===
Notes

Sources

- Hume, John R. (1976). The Industrial Archaeology of Scotland. 1. The Lowlands and Borders. London : B.T.Batsford. ISBN 0-7134-3234-9.
