= River Cart =

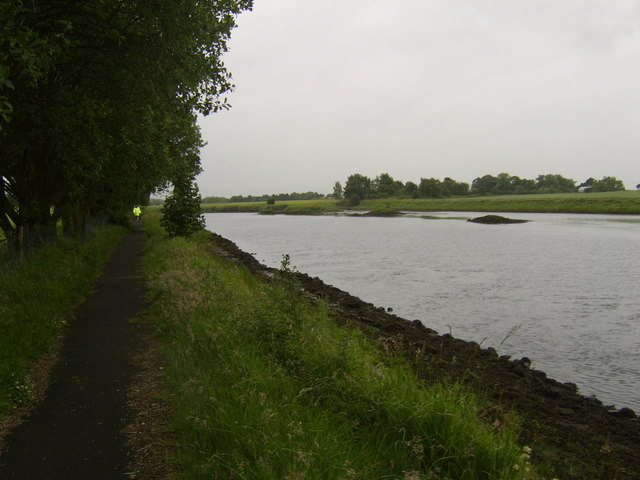
- River Cart, looking south

Location
- Country: Scotland

Physical characteristics
- Mouth: River Clyde
  - location: Glasgow, Scotland
  - coordinates: 55.8917°N 4.4049°W

The River Cart is a tributary of the River Clyde, Scotland, which it joins from the west roughly midway between the towns of Erskine and Renfrew and opposite the town of Clydebank.

The River Cart itself is very short, being formed from the confluence of the Black Cart Water (from the west) and the White Cart Water (from the south east) and is only 3/4 mile (1.2 kilometres) long. The River Cart and its tributary the White Cart Water were navigable as far as the Seedhill Craigs at Paisley; and, as with the River Clyde, various improvements were made to this river navigation.

In 1840 the 1/2-mile (800-metre) Forth and Cart Canal was opened, linking the Forth and Clyde Canal, at Whitecrook near Clydebank, to the River Clyde, opposite the mouth of the River Cart. The aim was to provide a direct link between Paisley, Port Dundas, Edinburgh, and the Firth of Forth.

== Black Cart Water ==
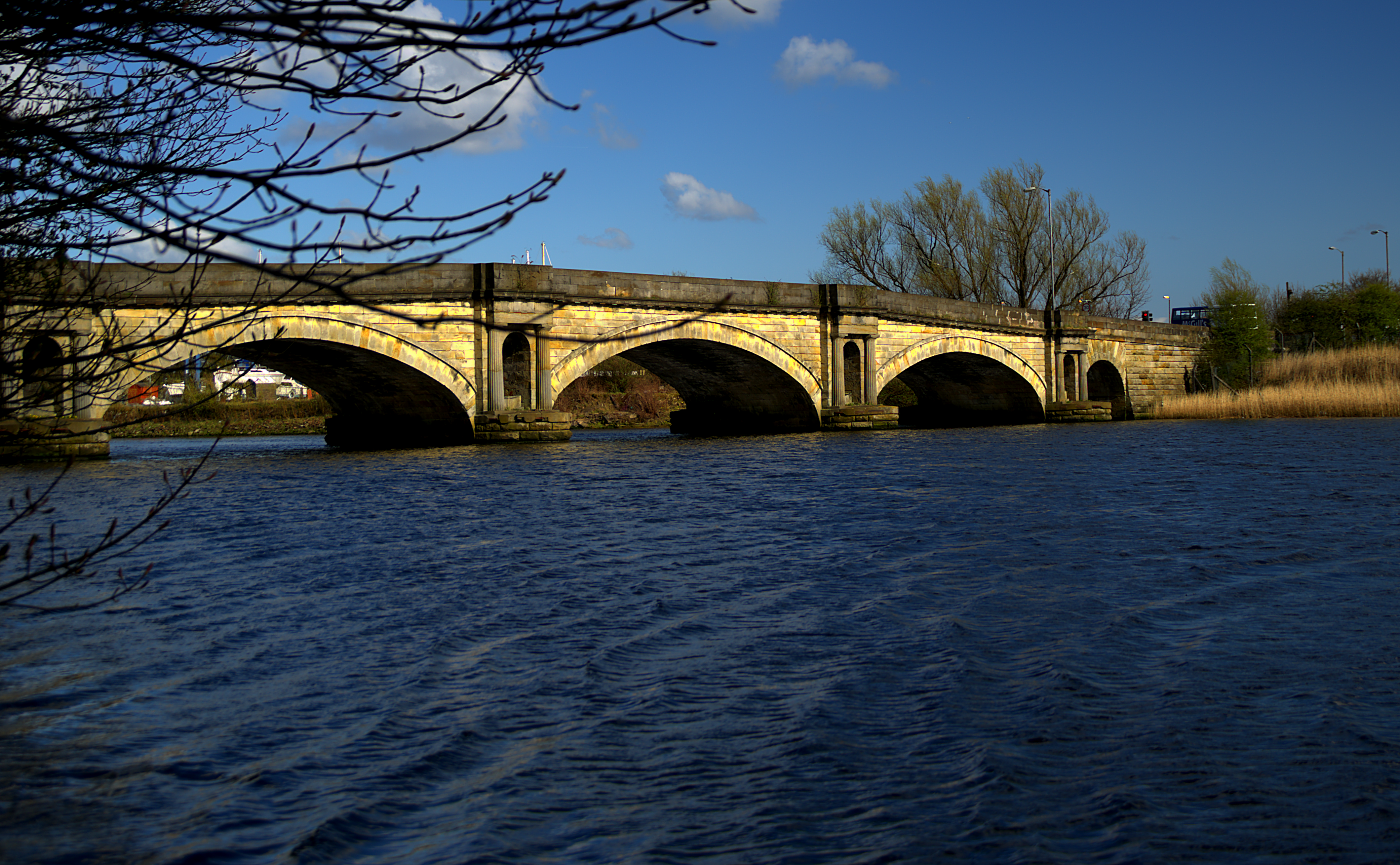
19th century stone bridge over the Black Cart at Inchinnan

The Black Cart Water originates at Castle Semple Loch in Lochwinnoch, Renfrewshire. From there, it flows northeast though Johnstone, passes Linwood and then under the M8 motorway at Blackstoun, where it is joined by the River Gryfe. The river then flows parallel with the main runway of Glasgow Airport; passing under the A8 at Renfrew by means of a stone bridge, where it joins the White Cart Water.

== White Cart Water ==
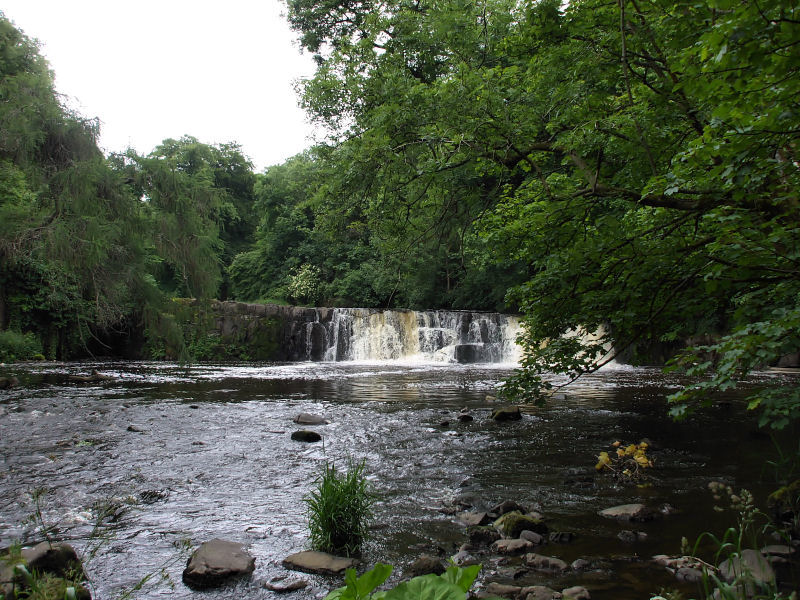
Waterfall at White Cart Water in Linn Park between Netherlee and Muirend

The waterhead of the White Cart Water originates in South Lanarkshire, just beyond the south-eastern boundary of East Renfrewshire, where Eaglesham Moor meets Ellrig Muir. Although a large number of historical sources from the 1500s to the 1900s attest its origin on Ellrig Hill, some discrepancies in mid-19th century OS mapping between counties, coupled with later mis-readings of the same by gazetteers, have led to a much repeated but false consensus in later sources, that the watercourse rises further west, on Corse Hill in Eaglesham parish; an error repeated by such reputable sources as newspapers, local authority websites and digital map data licences used by many entities. From its hydrological source, known historically as the Tor Burn or Tors Burn, the watercourse flows northwest where it combines with several unnamed rills draining from the northern slopes of Corse Hill. Thence it runs past the southern landward area of East Kilbride where it is augmented by the False Cart, Threepland Burn, Crosshouse Gill, and eventually the Polnoon Water, thereby becoming a sizeable watercourse which was traditionally regarded as the rise of the White Cart proper. Thence it flows towards the settlement of Waterfoot, where the Earn Water then joins the river, forming the boundary between East Renfrewshire and South Lanarkshire here before running through the centre of the village of Busby. It passes under a large railway viaduct before being joined by the Thorntonhall Burn and Kittoch Water, an important tributary and the main river from East Kilbride. After this the river again becomes a border as it runs around the eastern side of Clarkston and Netherlee. The river is surrounded by ancient woodland through Busby and there is a large SSSI for the even larger ancient woodland on the east bank past Clarkston and Netherlee. This ends roughly where it crosses the Glasgow city boundary into Linn Park, heading downstream to Cathcart. Here the river turns west, flowing through Battlefield, Langside, Shawlands, Pollokshaws and then Auldhouse where there is a confluence with the Auldhouse Burn, (made from the confluence of Capelrig Burn and Broom Burn in Newton Mearns and travelling in two streams through Rouken Glen Park in Giffnock and the town of Thornliebank).

The river then starts cutting through Pollok Country Park, passing under the M77 motorway at Pollok towards Crookston and Cardonald, where it is joined by the Levern Water from Neilston and Barrhead. From Crookston, the river passes the grounds of Leverndale Hospital and then crosses into Renfrewshire and flows through the farmlands of Hawkhead, parallel with the Paisley Canal railway line. On entering the town of Paisley, the river falls over rapids called the Hammils and flows under two roads to emerge in the town centre at Paisley Abbey. It then passes under Gauze Street, the Piazza Shopping Centre and Paisley Gilmour Street railway station where it emerges from the Abercorn Bridge, a wide, high arched red sandstone bridge at Old Sneddon Street. From there it runs, mostly hidden from view, towards Glasgow Airport and Renfrew.

In Paisley the White Cart is joined by tributary streams including the Lady Burn, the St Mirin Burn, the Sneddon Burn and the Espedair Burn. Just outside the burgh boundary, close to Glasgow Airport, the river meets with the Abbot's Burn. The Greenock Road (A8), between Inchinnan and Renfrew, passes over the White Cart Water by means of the swing bridge. The White Cart Water then joins with the Black Cart Water, just downstream of the bridge, to become the River Cart.

Robert Burns's poem The Gallant Weaver mentions the White Cart Water.

A major flood alleviation scheme has been built by Glasgow City Council to protect vulnerable property on the south side of Glasgow. Designed by Halcrow the scheme was at the time the largest flood alleviation project undertaken in Scotland. The scheme built three dams, all in neighbouring East Renfrewshire. One is on the border with South Lanarkshire.

== Medieval uses ==
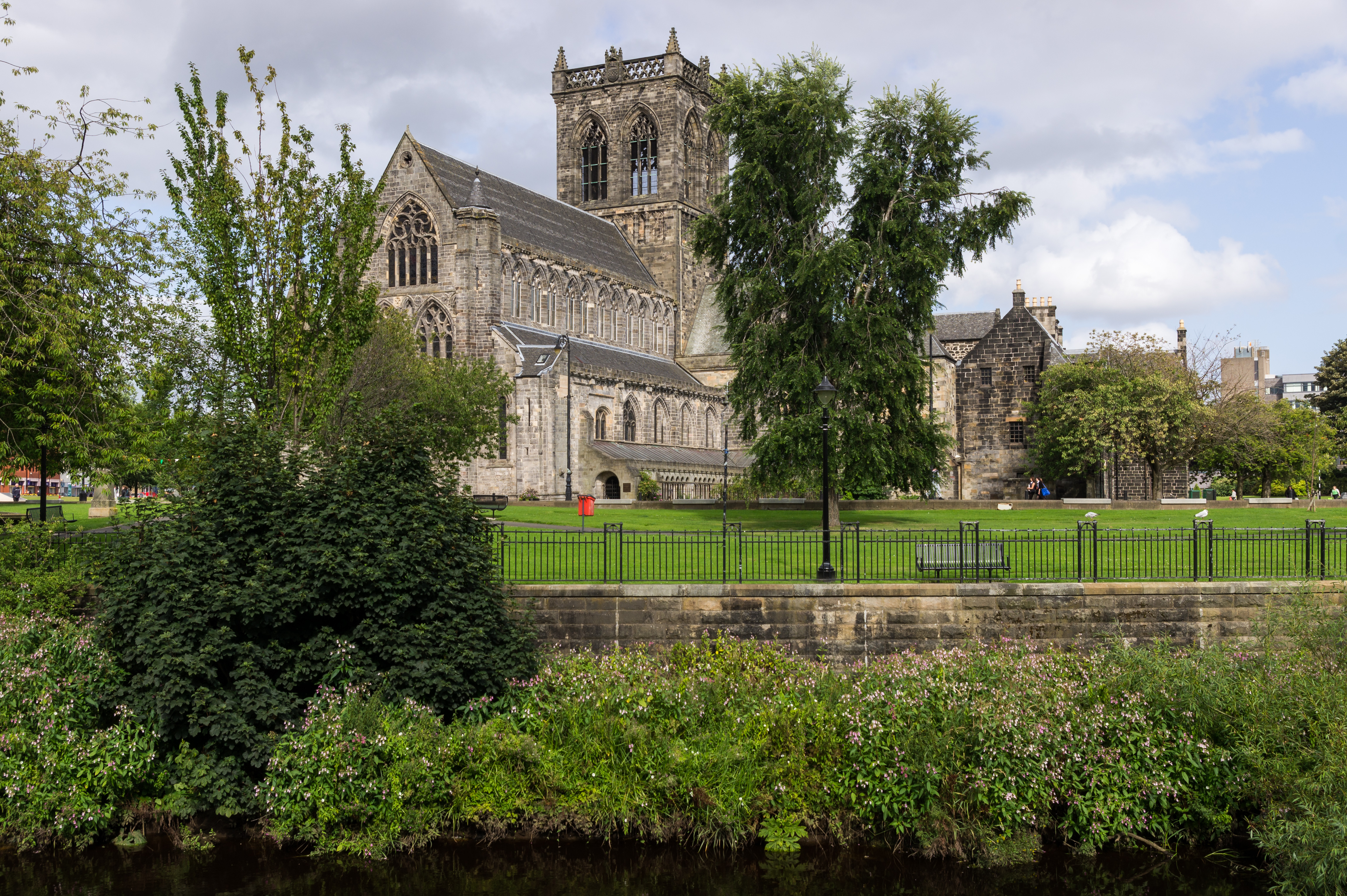
Paisley Abbey from the west with White Cart Water

Paisley Abbey has a medieval drain, belonging to the monastery, which was rediscovered in the 1990s; and excavated by archaeologists. The abbey/monastery drain linked with the White Cart Water both upstream and downstream of the abbey, near to where the Town Hall now stands. The White Cart Water provided both drinking water for the monastery and was used to flush away kitchen waste and the latrines.

== River Cart Navigation improvement schemes ==
The River Cart and the White Cart are navigable to Paisley; being blocked in the 1960s, at Sneddon Street, by the aqueduct under the Piazza Shopping Centre.

=== 18th and 19th century improvements ===
The Paisley Beer Duties Act 1753 provided for "laying a duty of two pennies Scots, or one sixth part of a penny Sterling, on every Scots Pint of Ale and Beer which shall be brewed for sale, brought into, tapped or sold within the Town of Paisley and Liberties thereof, in the County of Renfrew, for improving the Navigation of the River Cart, and for other Purposes".

River Cart Navigation Act 1787
- Act of Parliament
- Parliament of Great Britain
- Long title: An Act for enabling the Magistrates and Town Council of Paisley, to improve the Navigation of the River Cart, and to make a Navigable Cut or Canal, across the Turnpike Road leading from Glasgow to Greenock.
- Citation: 27 Geo. 3. c. 56
- Territorial extent: Great Britain

Dates
- Royal assent: 21 May 1787
- Commencement: 23 January 1787 (Note: Start of session.)
- Repealed: 17 February 1971
Other legislation
Amended by	River Cart Navigation and Paisley Harbour Act 1835
Repealed by	Paisley Corporation (Cart Navigation) Order Confirmation Act 1971

Status: Repealed

Text of statute as originally enacted

A further act of Parliament, the River Cart Navigation Act 1787 (27 Geo. 3. c. 56), was obtained by the Cart Trust for the river's improvement in 1787, in response to pressure from Paisley's shipbuilders. This led to some improvements around Inchinnan. The first steamer service to Paisley, provided by the Prince of Orange, started in July 1815.

The original Swing Bridge, at Inchinnan, on the Turn Pike road, now the A8, was opened in 1838; the mechanism for swing bridge was made by Barr and McNab of the Abercorn Foundry, Paisley. A year earlier the, Scotch gauge, Paisley and Renfrew Railway had opened between Paisley Hamilton Street and Renfrew Wharf. The railway was intended to both enhance the capabilities of the River Cart navigation as well as competing against it for goods and passenger traffic. The Cart Trust later went bankrupt.

The Forth and Cart Canal, opened in 1840, together with the Forth and Clyde Canal, was intended to provide a direct link between Paisley, Port Dundas, Edinburgh, and the Firth of Forth, without the need to go down the River Clyde to Bowling and return along the Forth and Clyde Canal to almost the starting point. Its aim was to bring coal to Paisley.

In January 1866 the Paisley and Renfrew Railway was temporarily closed. When it reopened as a standard gauge railway it was linked to the Glasgow and Paisley Joint Railway at Arkleston Junction. As a result, Hamilton Street station closed.

Paisley's harbour was extended and the re-opening in April 1891 was celebrated by a fleet of steamers sailing from Paisley to Rothesay.

=== 20th century improvements ===
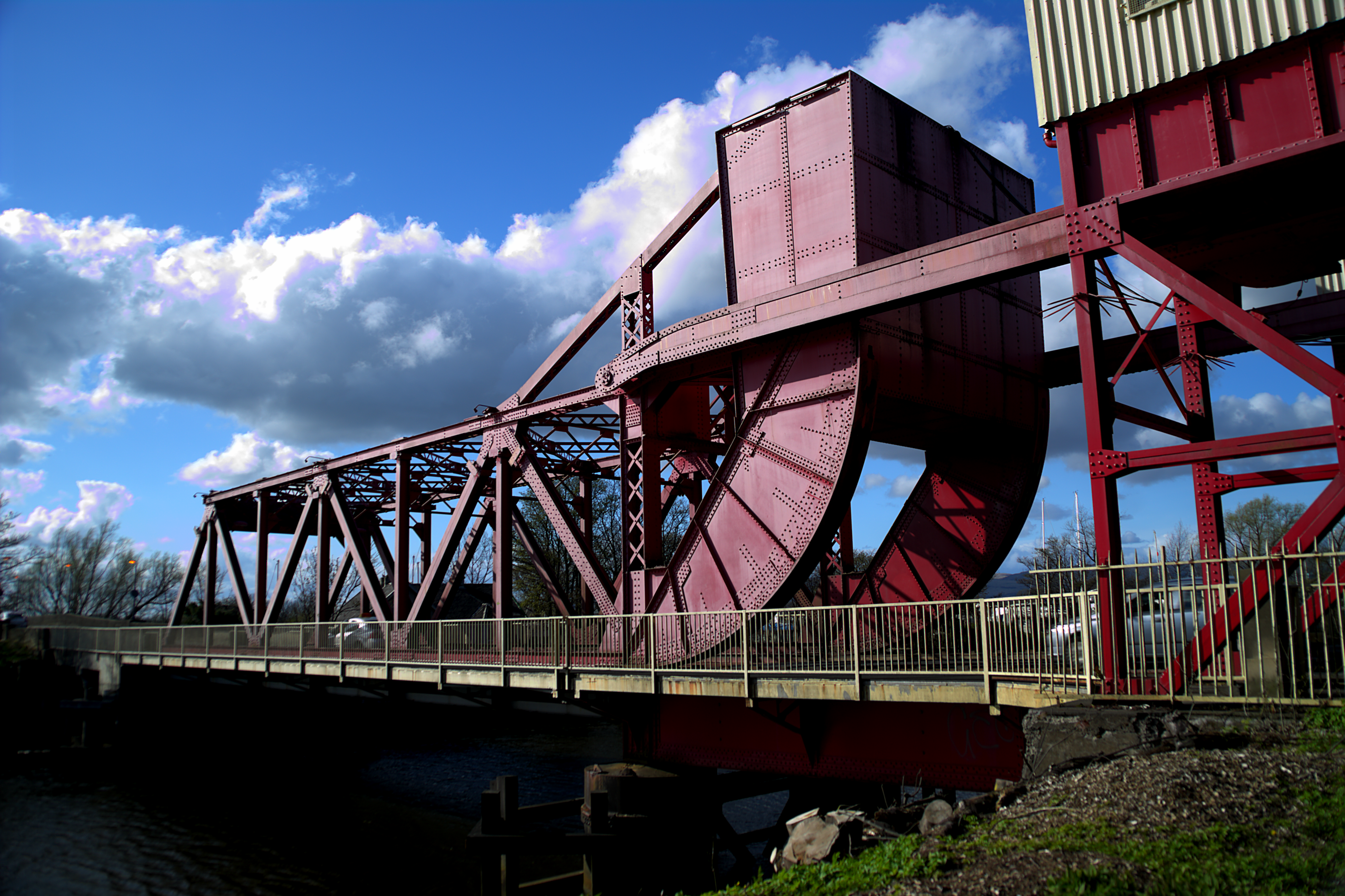
1923 Bascule bridge by William Arrol & Co

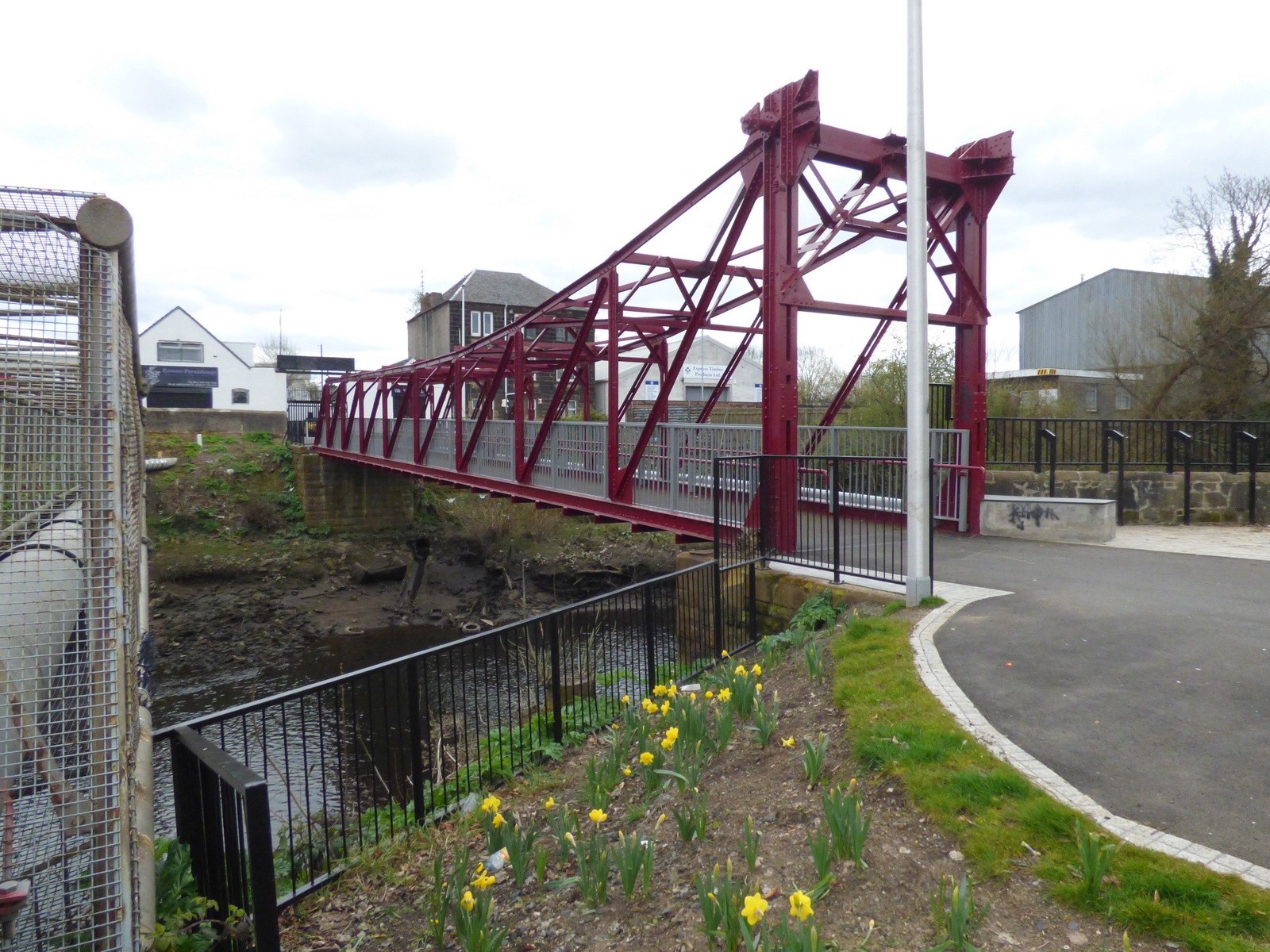
The reopened Carlile Place Footbridge

Further, unsuccessful, attempts were made to improve the River Cart at the start of the 20th century. In 1920, after the end of World War I, attempts were made to buy out the bankrupt Cart Trust; but they resisted these attempts.

Two Scherzer type Bascule bridges were built across the river, one at Renfrew and one at Paisley. These are the only Scherzer type bridges in the West of Scotland.

The original swing bridge at Renfrew was replaced in 1923 by a bascule bridge, which was made by Sir William Arrol & Company. It is still capable of opening, as the Doosan Babcock factory at Renfrew requires the capability to move large loads by river. The first American troops to disembark onto UK soil in the Second World War did so by ship at Carlile Quay in Paisley.

Sir William Arrol and Co also made the pedestrian lifting bridge across the White Cart Water at Carlile Quay (off New Sneddon Street) in 1911. The lifting apparatus was removed when navigation above this point ceased in 1942. The bridge was closed to traffic in 1997, the structure being deemed unsafe. It reopened in November 2021 following a major refurbishment, although the lifting mechanism was not restored.

An Act of Parliament was obtained in 1938 by the Ministry of Transport, the Admiralty and the Ministry of Shipping. A harbour was built at Laigh Park (Laighpark harbour) at which large cargo boats / ships could load and unload; it was linked to the Paisley and Renfrew Railway. This was used extensively during World War II. Carlile Quay being used for smaller boats. The navigation lights were also upgraded.

The harbour fell into disuse in the 1960s and has been used as a scrapyard for many decades. Carlile Quay has been landscaped, refurbished and made more attractive to pedestrians. Apartment buildings and houses have been built on the vacant site adjacent to the quay.

=== 21st century developments ===
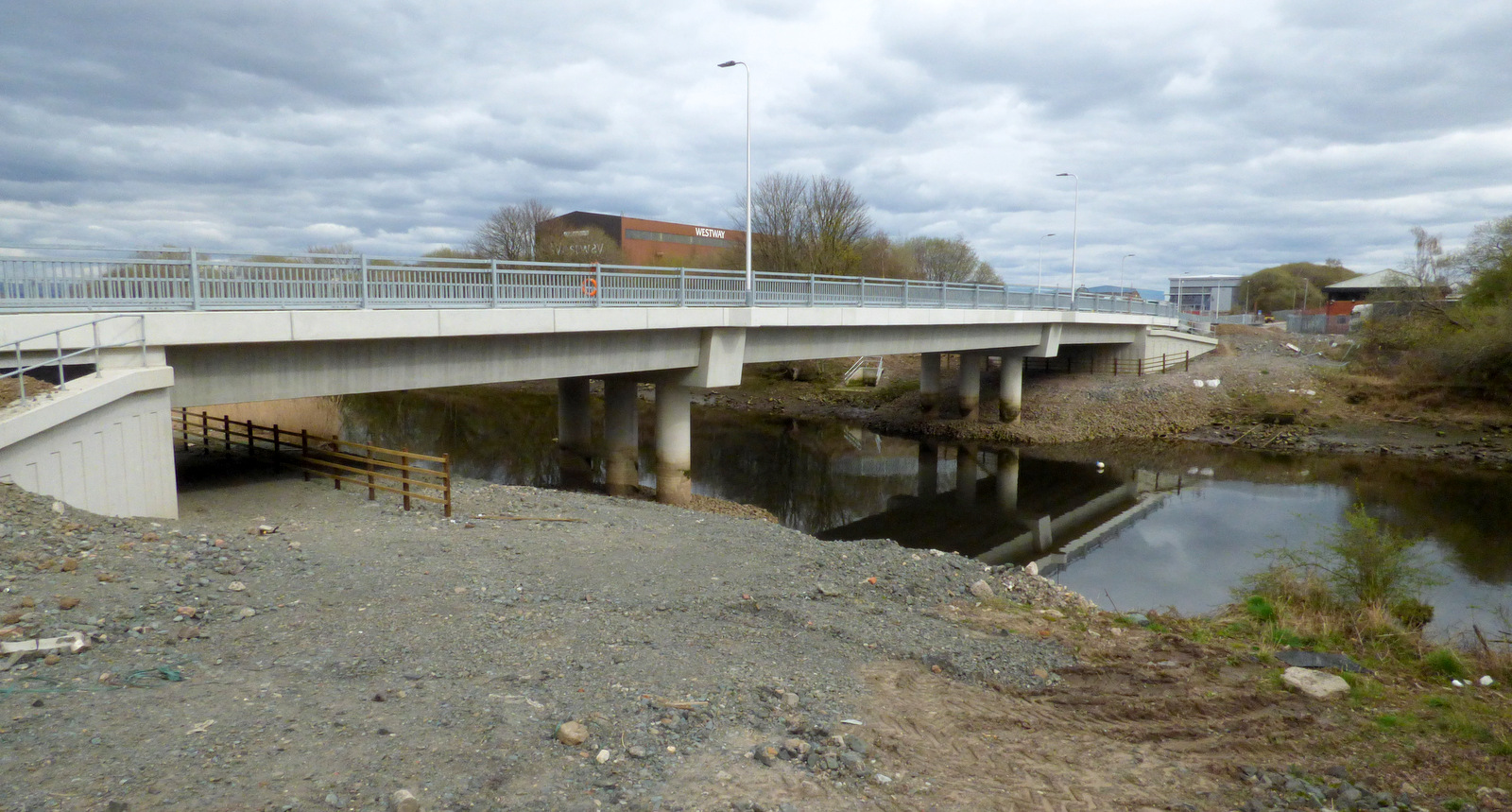
Barnwell Street bridge nearing completion

As referenced above, the Carlile footbridge was reopened in November 2021. Around the same time, a new road bridge was being constructed further downstream between Wright Street in Renfrew and Arran Avenue at the Glasgow Airport long stay car park. Known as Barnwell Street bridge, it was officially opened in August 2022.

Due to its low clearance, this static bridge limits upstream navigation to smaller craft only.

=== Sewage ===
All of Paisley's sewage and industrial effluent had been discharged untreated into the River Cart via its tributaries: the St Mirin Burn, the Lady Burn, the Sneddon Burn, the Espedair Burn, etc. By 1870 this had led to many complaints about smells and epidemics.

"Intercepting sewers" were therefore built on either side of the St Mirin burn to intercept the sewage and discharge it directly into the White Cart Water. Whilst this helped clean up Paisley it did not clean up the River Cart. It led to complaints from Johnstone, Renfrew and Glasgow and calls by them for Paisley to provide a sewage treatment farm. Johnstone, Bridge of Weir, Lochwinnoch and Glasgow already had sewage treatment farms. Glasgow's works had begun operations in 1894.

Land at Laigh Park was bought for this purpose between the first and second World Wars although construction work did not start until 1949 with the works opening in 1952. The sewage works were linked to the intercepting sewers and took all of Paisley's sewage and industrial effluent for treatment.

=== Water power ===
Both the Black Cart Water and the White Cart Water provided power to drive mills. The best preserved on the White Cart is Dripps Mill in Waterfoot, which still has two functioning 19th century waterwheels.

== See also ==
- Canals of the United Kingdom
- History of the British canal system
