= Canal safety gates =

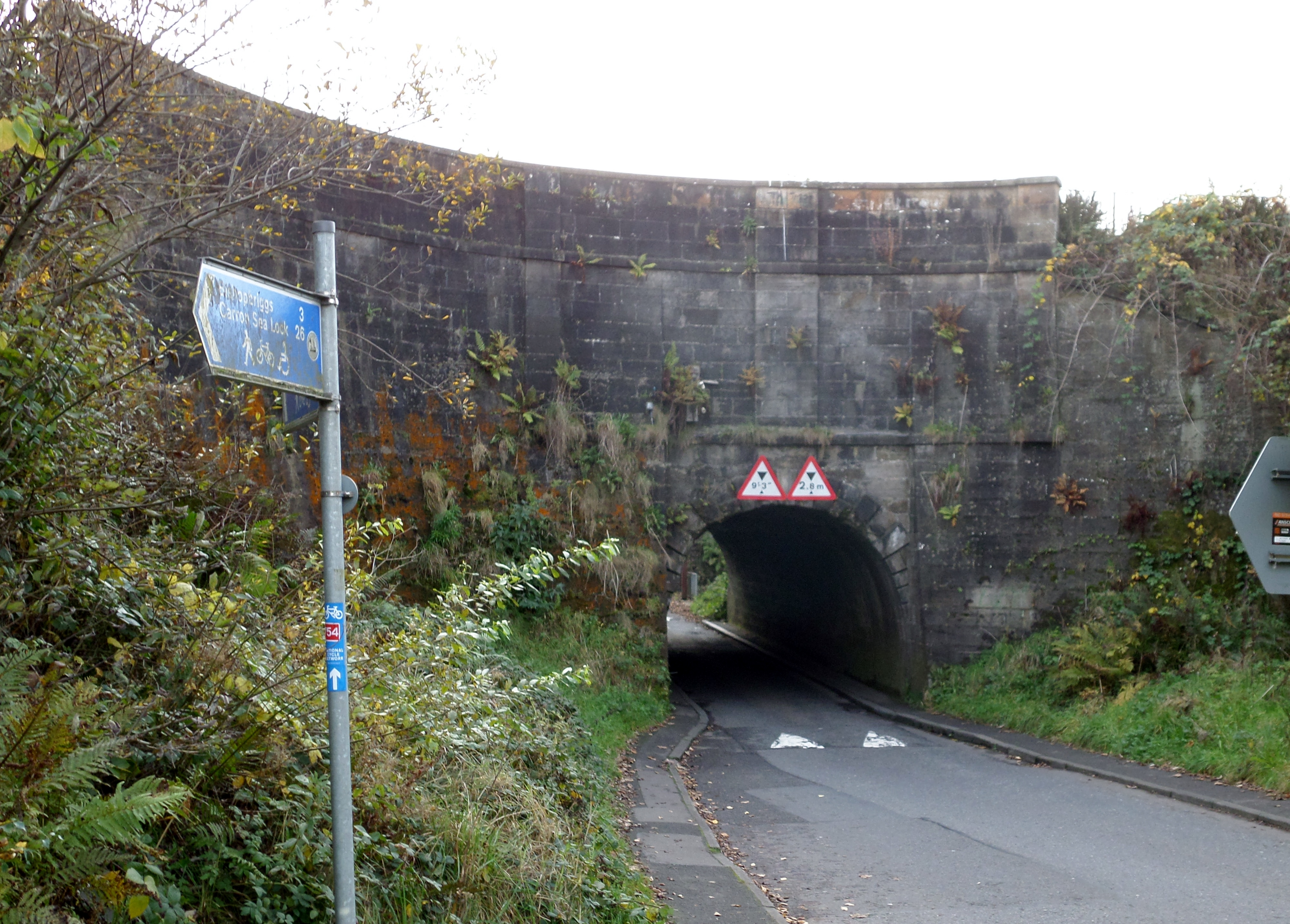
Stockingfield or Lochburn Aqueduct was a potential target for the Luftwaffe in WWII.

Canal safety gates or canal air raid protection gates are structures that were installed on canals specifically to reduce or prevent flood damage to dwellings, factories, etc. in the event of aqueducts, canal banks, etc. being breached either through natural events or by enemy action during wars, insurgency, sabotage, etc. They sometimes have a secondary function in regard of canal maintenance work. Substantial structures or simple 'stop gates' or 'stop planks' were used to prevent flooding and were usually only put in place when air raid warnings were given.

== Introduction ==
Large volumes of stored water have considerable destructive potential and where structures such as canals run on embankments above low lying built up areas or where aqueducts exist, appropriate safety precautions were taken either as a war-time contingency or at the time of construction. These 'canal safety gates' or 'canal air raid protection gates (ARPG)' were constructed and installed in regard to the scale of the danger posed and ranged from simple wooden planks known as 'stop gates' or 'stop planks' to more massive constructions built of concrete and steel such as the safety gates built on the Forth and Clyde Canal near Stockingfield Junction and on the Glasgow Branch at Firhill Road and Craighall Road.

Where a water link was no longer commercially important, but still represented a risk in case of damage, it might be closed off permanently with concrete or an earth bank. This was done in Bristol at the beginning of WWII to protect the floating harbour by blocking the river access from the harbour at Bathurst Basin and the Feeder Canal at Totterdown Basin.

== Canals with safety gates ==
=== The Forth and Clyde Canal ===
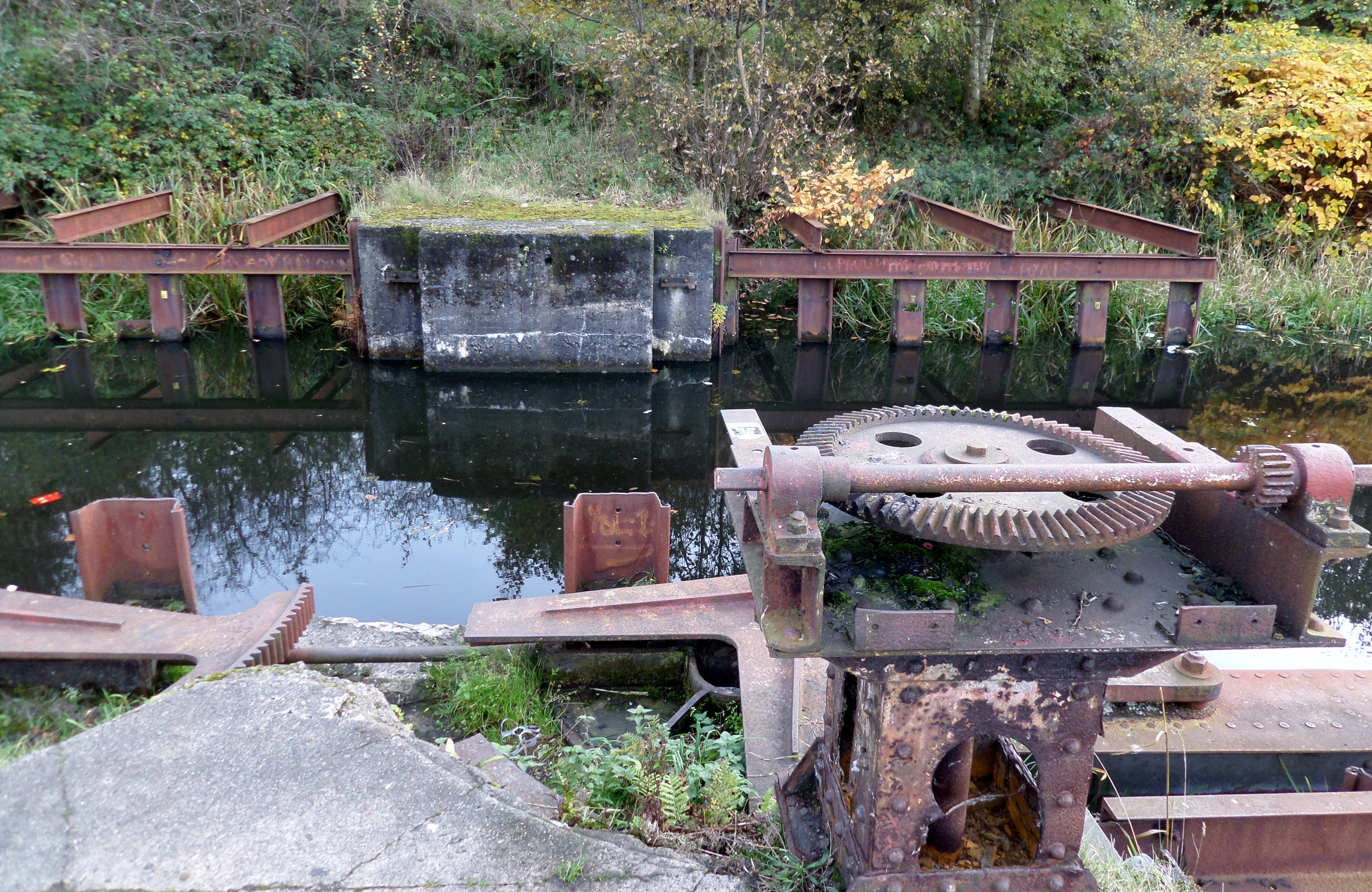
The Stockingfield Narrows 'Safety Gates'

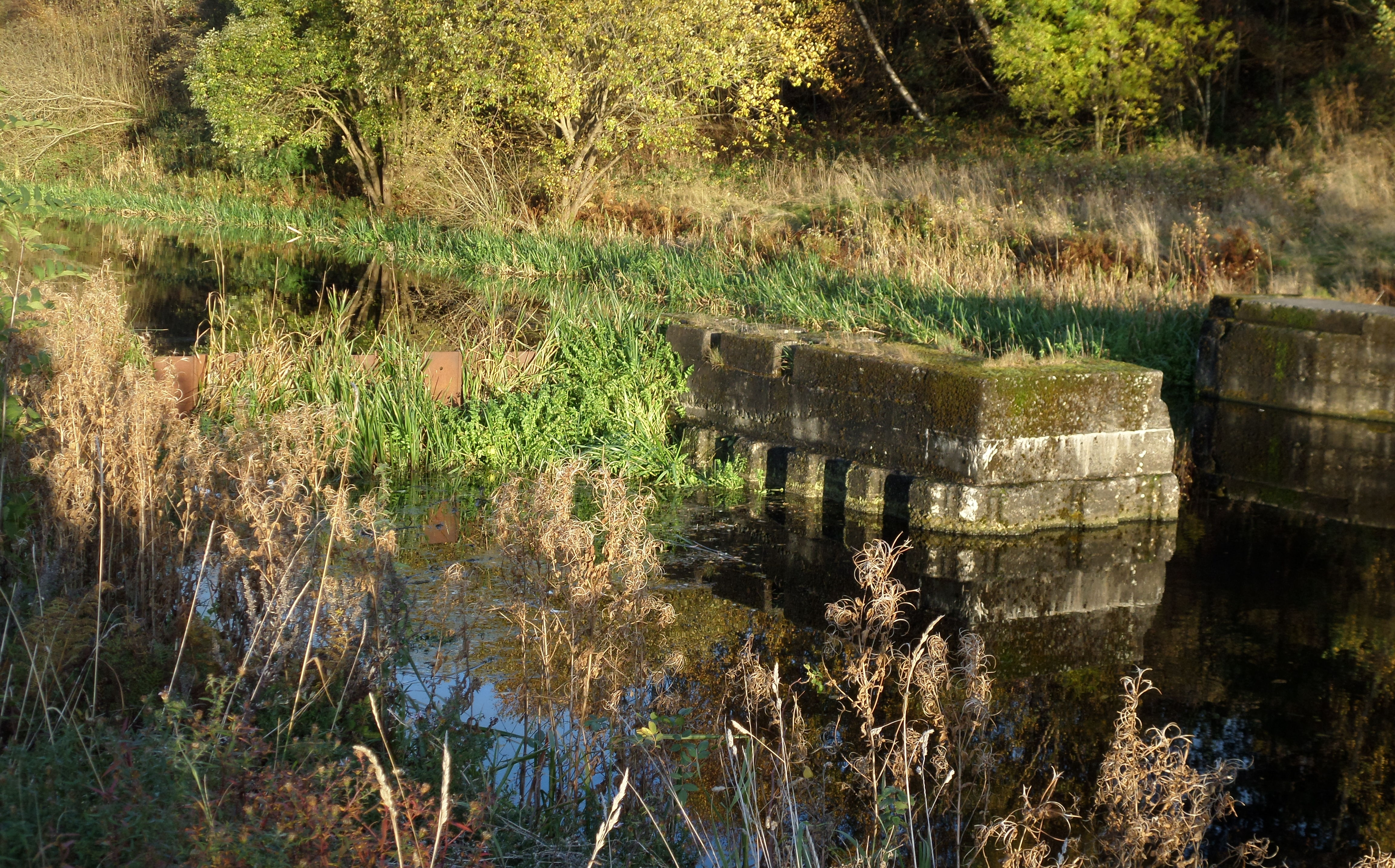
The safety gates at Firhill Road Narrows on the Glasgow Branch of the Forth & Clyde Canal

In 1942 two massive steel safety, or stop, gates were constructed on the Edinburgh side of Stockingfield Junction at what is known as the Stockingfield Narrows. The purpose of these two hand cranked steel gates was to hold back the waters of the Forth and Clyde Canal to prevent serious flooding in Glasgow in the event of bombing destroying or breaching the nearby Stockingfield Aqueduct. The nearest lock on the Edinburgh main line that could control the water loss after a breach is 27 kilometres (17 miles) away at Wyndford, Lock 20.

Further sets of safety, or stop, locks were also created in WWII on the Glasgow Branch at the Firhill Road Narrows and at Craighall Road Narrows near Speirs Wharf, protecting the city from potential damage to the two aqueducts on this route. The Stockingfield Narrows gates are substantially intact whilst mainly the concrete parts of the structures remain at Firhill Road Narrows.

=== The Union Canal ===
The Union Canal was built as a contour or mathematical canal and is approximately 52 kilometres (32 miles) in length, following the 73-metre (240-foot) contour throughout, thereby avoiding the need for locks but lacking this means of restricting water loss in the event of a breach. For safety the engineers between 1818 and 1822 provided gates in case of structural failures and for canal maintenance using single leaf, timber gates at nineteen locations. Scottish Canals have had two timber bridge hole gates made to the original design and dimensions for installation at Linlithgow.

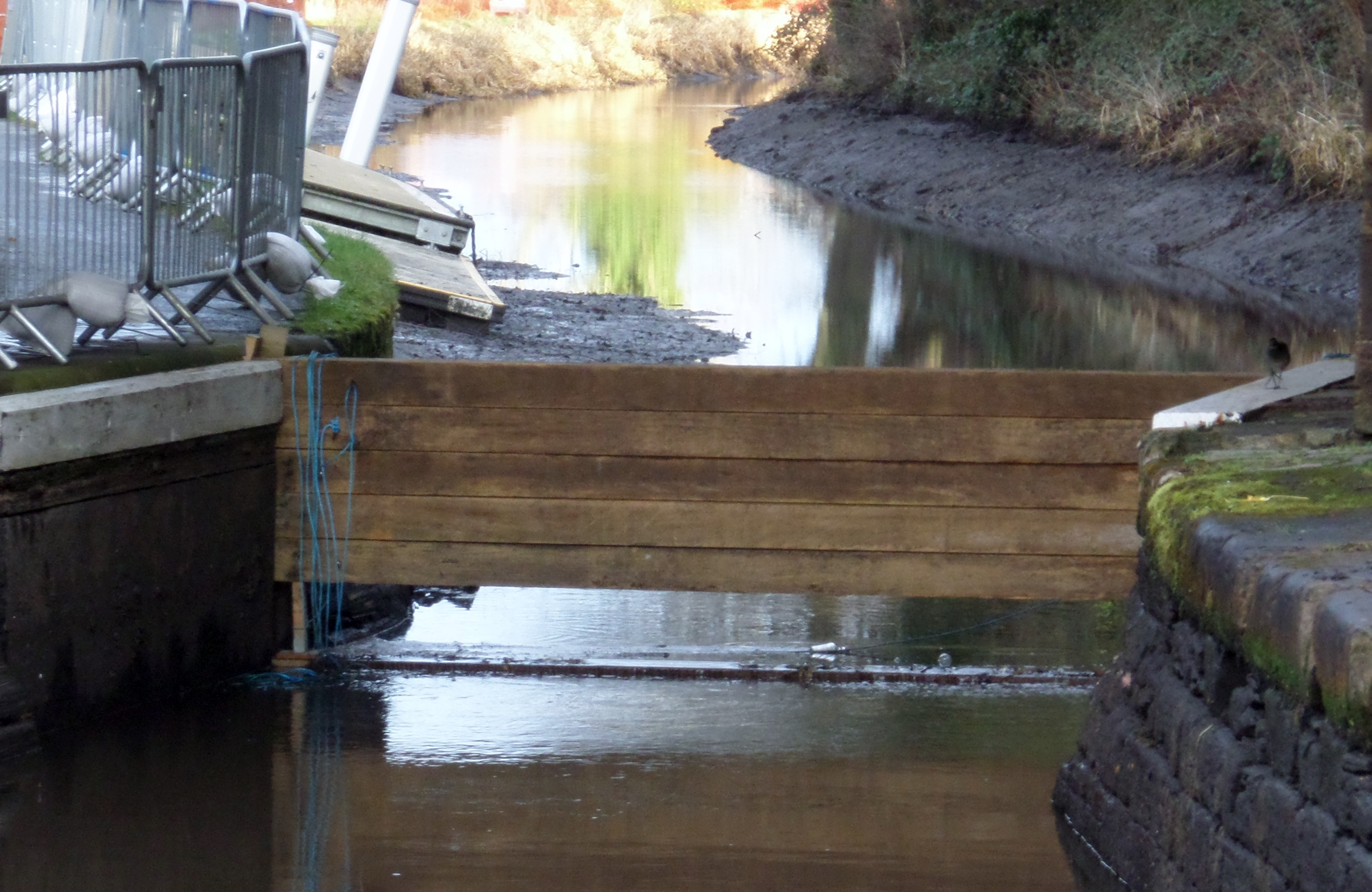
Safety gates at Linlithgow canal basin

=== The Gloucester and Sharpness Canal ===
The Gloucester and Sharpness Canal is a 27-kilometre-long (17-mile) canal, up to 5 metres (16 feet) in depth, so that in the event of a canal breach millions of litres of water would flood the area. A series of safety gates are located along the canal and are particularly important as an unusual feature of the canal is a lack of locks, being described as a contour canal. In an emergency these gates automatically close to ensure that any risk created by a flood is controlled, protecting Gloucester and the villages along the course of the canal to Sharpness.

=== The Grand Union and Regent's Canal ===
The Grand Union Canal starts in London and runs to Birmingham with a total length of 220 kilometres (140 miles) and 166 locks. Safety or Air Raid Protection (ARP) gates were installed at around 16 locations that were designed to automatically close if the canals were damaged during the WWII Luftwaffe's air raids. A very large number of bombs, etc. fell in the vicinity of the canals in London during the war, however no significant flooding resulted from damage to canals.

The Air Raid Precautions (ARP) Department was created in 1935 to ensure that local authorities and other employers co-operated with central government. Canals on embankments through low-lying or built up areas such as London were identified as being particularly vulnerable to bombing and sabotage. At the very least resultant flooding would endanger lives, disrupt transport interchanges at King's Cross and Paddington and endanger factories in the Thames Valley.

In 1938 stop planks and safety gates were installed in the Regent's Canal and in the Grand Union Canal in Greater London area and its Slough branch. Stop plank grooves were cut at each end of the aqueducts and at all weir sluices, whilst the stop gates were built in such a way that they did not unduly obstruct canal traffic.

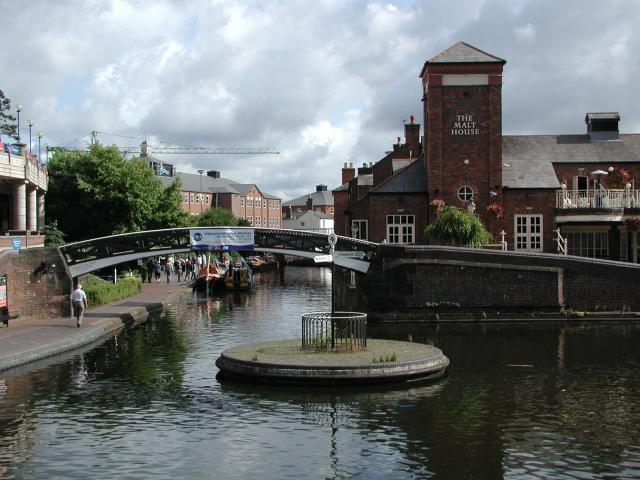
Roundabout Island on the Birmingham Canal Navigations

=== Birmingham Canal Navigations ===
The Roundabout island at Old Turn Junction was installed during WWII, to facilitate the insertion of safety gates to protect the railway tunnel of the Stour Valley railway line that runs beneath it, in the event of a breach through bombing. The canal at this point was too wide and the island was required to narrow the canal enough for gates to be installed when required.

=== Dortmund–Ems Canal ===
The Dortmund–Ems Canal in Germany was a prime target for bombing by the RAF in WWII and had safety gates installed to reduce flooding, loss of water from the canal and limit numbers of boats stranded.

=== The Danube–Tisa–Danube Canal ===
The Danube–Tisa–Danube Canal system in Serbia has 24 gates, 16 locks, five safety gates.

== Micro-history ==
Attempts were made by six members of the Ribbon Society (Irish dissidents) in March 1883 to blow up the Possil Road Aqueduct on the Glasgow Branch of the Forth and Clyde Canal.

== See also ==
- Canals of the United Kingdom
- History of the British canal system

=== References ===
Notes

Sources

- Bartley, Paula (2016). Queen Victoria. Routledge. ISBN 978-0-415-72091-5
- Hume, John R. (1976). The Industrial Archaeology of Scotland. 1. The Lowlands and Borders. London : B.T.Batsford. ISBN 0-7134-3234-9.
- Shill, Ray (1999). Birmingham's Canals. Sutton Publishing Ltd. ISBN 0-7509-2077-7.
- Skipper's Guide. Forth & Clyde Canal Scottish Canals. 2016.
