= Forth and Clyde Canal =

Canal crossing central Scotland

Coordinates: 55°55′47″N 4°28′56″W

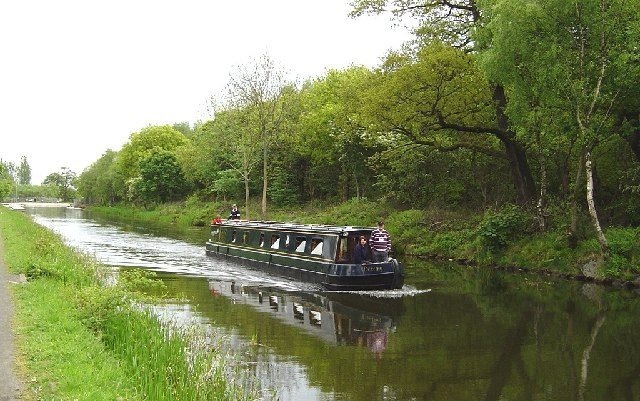
- The Forth and Clyde Canal, near Bonnybridge and Larbert
- Interactive map of Forth and Clyde Canal
- Country: United Kingdom

Specifications
- Length: 35 miles (56 km)

Geography
- Start point: Firth of Forth
- End point: Firth of Clyde

The Forth and Clyde Canal is a canal opened in 1790, crossing central Scotland; it provided a route for the seagoing vessels of the day between the Firth of Forth and the Firth of Clyde at the narrowest part of the Scottish Lowlands. This allowed navigation from Edinburgh on the east coast to the port of Glasgow on the west coast. The canal is 35 miles (56 km) long and it runs from the River Carron at Grangemouth to the River Clyde at Bowling, and had an important basin at Port Dundas in Glasgow.

Successful in its day, it suffered as the seagoing vessels were built larger and could no longer pass through. The railway age further impaired the success of the canal, and in the 1930s decline had ended in dormancy. The final decision to close the canal in the early 1960s was made due to maintenance costs of bridges crossing the canal exceeding the revenues it brought in. However, subsidies to the rail network were also a cause for its decline and the closure ended the movement of the east-coast Forth River fishing fleets across the country to fish the Irish Sea. The lack of political and financial foresight also removed a historical recreational waterway and potential future revenue generator to the town of Grangemouth. Unlike the majority of major canals the route through Grangemouth was drained and backfilled before 1967 to create a new carriageway for port traffic.

The M8 motorway in the eastern approaches to Glasgow took over some of the alignment of the canal, but more recent ideas have regenerated the utility of the canal for leisure use.

== Geography ==
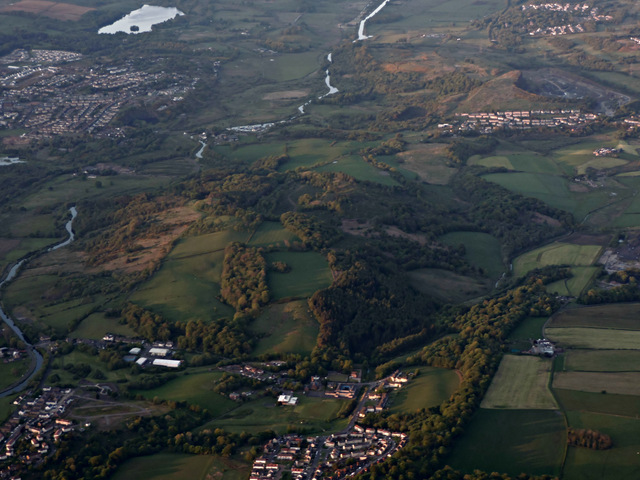
Bar Hill and Twechar with Kilsyth and Croy in the background

The eastern end of the canal is connected to the River Forth by a stretch of the River Carron near Grangemouth. The canal roughly follows the course of the Roman Antonine Wall and was the biggest infrastructure project in Scotland since then. The highest section of the canal passes close to Kilsyth and it is fed there by an aqueduct which gathers water from (the purpose built) Birkenburn Reservoir in the Kilsyth Hills, stored in another purpose-built reservoir called Townhead near Banton, from where it feeds the canal via a feeder from the Shawend Burn near Craigmarloch. The canal continues past Twechar, through Kirkintilloch and Bishopbriggs to the Maryhill area north of Glasgow city centre. A branch to Port Dundas was built to secure the agreement and financial support of Glasgow merchants who feared losing business if the canal bypassed them completely. This branch flows past Murano Street Student Village, halls of residence for the University of Glasgow. The western end of the canal connects to the River Clyde at Bowling.

In 1840, a 1/2-mile (800 m) canal, the Forth and Cart Canal, was built to link the Forth and Clyde canal, at Whitecrook, to the River Clyde, opposite the mouth of the River Cart.

== Origins ==
Forth and Clyde Navigation Act 1768
- Act of Parliament
- Parliament of Great Britain
- Long title: An Act for making and maintaining a Navigable Cut or Canal from the Firth or River of Forth, at or near the Mouth of the River of Carron, in the County of Stirling, to the Firth or River of Clyde, at or near a Place called Dalmuir Burn-foot, in the County of Dumbarton; and also a collateral Cut from the same to the City of Glasgow, and for making a Navigable Cut or Canal of Communication from the Port and Harbour of Borrowstounness, to join the Said Canal, at or near, the Place where it will fall into the Firth of Forth.
- Citation: 8 Geo. 3. c. 63
- Territorial extent: Great Britain

Dates
- Royal assent: 8 March 1768
- Commencement: 24 November 1767 (Note: Start of session.)
- Repealed: 21 June 1841
Other legislation
Amended by	Forth and Clyde Navigation Act 1771; Forth and Clyde Navigation Act 1773; Forth and Clyde Navigation Act 1784; Forth and Clyde Navigation (No. 2) Act 1787; Forth and Clyde and Monkland Canal Act 1790; Forth and Clyde Navigation Act 1820
Repealed by	Forth and Clyde Navigation Act 1841

Status: Repealed

Text of statute as originally enacted

Forth and Clyde Navigation Act 1771
- Act of Parliament
- Parliament of Great Britain
- Long title: An Act to explain, amend, and render more effectual an Act made in the Eighth Year of His present Majesty's Reign, intituled, "An Act for making and maintaining a Navigable Cut or Canal from the Firth or River of Forth, at or near the Mouth of the River of Carron in the County of Stirling, to the Firth or River of Clyde, at or near a Place called Dalmuir Burnfoot in the County of Dumbarton; and also a collateral Cut from the same to the City of Glasgow; and for making a Navigable Cut or Canal of Communication, from the Port and Harbour of Borrowstounness, to join the said Canal at or near the Place where it will fall into the Firth of Forth."
- Citation: 11 Geo. 3. c. 62
- Territorial extent: Great Britain

Dates
- Royal assent: 8 March 1771
- Commencement: 13 November 1770
- Repealed: 21 June 1841
Other legislation
Amends	Forth and Clyde Navigation Act 1768
Amended by	Forth and Clyde Navigation Act 1773; Forth and Clyde Navigation (No. 2) Act 1787; Forth and Clyde and Monkland Canal Act 1790
Repealed by	Forth and Clyde Navigation Act 1841

Status: Repealed

Text of statute as originally enacted

Forth and Clyde Navigation Act 1773
- Act of Parliament
- Parliament of Great Britain
- Long title: An Act to enlarge the Powers of Two Acts, made in the Eighth and Eleventh Years of the Reign of His present Majesty, for making and maintaining a navigable Cut or Canal, from the Firth or River of Forth, at or near the Mouth of the River of Carron, in the County of Stirling, to the Firth or River of Clyde, at or near a Place called Dalmuir Burnfoot, in the County of Dumbarton; and also a collateral Cut from the same to the City of Glasgow; and for making a navigable Cut or Canal of Communication from the Port and Harbour, of Burrowstounness, to join the said Canal at or near the Place where it will sell into the Firth of Forth.
- Citation: 13 Geo. 3. c. 104
- Territorial extent: Great Britain

Dates
- Royal assent: 10 May 1773
- Commencement: 26 November 1772
- Repealed: 21 June 1841
Other legislation
Amends	Forth and Clyde Navigation Act 1768; Forth and Clyde Navigation Act 1771
Amended by	Forth and Clyde Navigation (No. 2) Act 1787; Forth and Clyde and Monkland Canal Act 1790
Repealed by	Forth and Clyde Navigation Act 1841

Status: Repealed

Text of statute as originally enacted

Forth and Clyde Navigation Act 1784
- Act of Parliament
- Parliament of Great Britain
- Long title: An Act for extending, amending, and altering the Powers of an Act made in the Eighth Year of the Reign of His present Majesty, intituled, "An Act for making and maintaining a navigable Cut, or Canal, from the Firth or River of Forth, at or near the Mouth of the River of Carron, in the County of Stirling, to the Firth or River of Clyde, at or near a Place called Dalmuir Burnfoot, in the County of Dumbarton; and also a collateral Cut from the same to the City of Glasgow; and for making a navigable Cut, or Canal of Communication, from the Port and Harbour of Borrowstounness, to join the said Canal, at or near the Place where it will fall into the Firth of Forth."
- Citation: 24 Geo. 3. Sess. 2. c. 59
- Territorial extent: Great Britain

Dates
- Royal assent: 19 August 1784
- Commencement: 18 May 1784
- Repealed: 21 June 1841
Other legislation
Amends	Forth and Clyde Navigation Act 1768
Amended by	Forth and Clyde Navigation (No. 2) Act 1787; Forth and Clyde and Monkland Canal Act 1790
Repealed by	Forth and Clyde Navigation Act 1841

Status: Repealed

Text of statute as originally enacted

Forth and Clyde Navigation Act 1787
- Act of Parliament
- Parliament of Great Britain
- Long title: An Act for varying and extending the Powers of the Company of Proprietors of the Forth and Clyde Navigation.
- Citation: 27 Geo. 3. c. 20
- Territorial extent: Great Britain

Dates
- Royal assent: 21 May 1787
- Commencement: 23 January 1787
- Repealed: 21 June 1841
Other legislation
Repealed by	Forth and Clyde Navigation Act 1841
Relates to	Forth and Clyde Navigation (No. 2) Act 1787

Status: Repealed

Text of statute as originally enacted

Forth and Clyde Navigation (No. 2) Act 1787
- Act of Parliament
- Parliament of Great Britain
- Long title: An Act for altering and extending the Line of the Cut or Canal authorized to be made and maintained by so much of several Acts made in the Eighth, Eleventh, Thirteenth, and Twenty-fourth Years of the Reign of His present Majesty, as authorizes the making and maintaining a navigable Cut or Canal from the Frith or River of Forth at or near the Mouth of the River of Carron in the County of Stirling, to the Frith or River of Clyde at or near a Place called Dalmuir Burnfoot in the County of Dumbarton; and also a collateral Cut from the same to the City of Glasgow; for deepening the said Cut or Canal, and for explaining and amending so much of the said Acts as relates to the making and maintaining the said Cut or Canal.
- Citation: 27 Geo. 3. c. 55
- Territorial extent: Great Britain

Dates
- Royal assent: 28 May 1787
- Commencement: 23 January 1787
- Repealed: 21 June 1841
Other legislation
Amends	Forth and Clyde Navigation Act 1768; Forth and Clyde Navigation Act 1771; Forth and Clyde Navigation Act 1773; Forth and Clyde Navigation Act 1784
Amended by	Forth and Clyde and Monkland Canal Act 1790
Repealed by	Forth and Clyde Navigation Act 1841
Relates to	Forth and Clyde Navigation Act 1787

Status: Repealed

Text of statute as originally enacted

Forth and Clyde and Monkland Canal Act 1790
- Act of Parliament
- Parliament of Great Britain
- Long title: An Act for forming a Junction between the Forth and Clyde Navigation, and the Monkland Navigation, and for altering, enlarging, and explaining, several former Acts passed, for making and maintaining the said Navigations.
- Citation: 30 Geo. 3. c. 73
- Territorial extent: Great Britain

Dates
- Royal assent: 9 June 1790
- Commencement: 21 January 1790
Other legislation
Amends	Forth and Clyde Navigation Act 1768; Monkland Canal Act 1770; Forth and Clyde Navigation Act 1771; Forth and Clyde Navigation Act 1773; Forth and Clyde Navigation Act 1784; Forth and Clyde Navigation (No. 2) Act 1787
Amended by	Forth and Clyde Navigation Act 1806; Forth and Clyde Navigation Act 1814

Status: Amended

Text of statute as originally enacted

Forth and Clyde Navigation Act 1806
- Act of Parliament
- Parliament of the United Kingdom
- Long title: An Act to alter and amend the several Acts passed for making and maintaining the Forth and Clyde Navigation.
- Citation: 46 Geo. 3. c. cxx
- Territorial extent: United Kingdom

Dates
- Royal assent: 12 July 1806
- Commencement: 12 July 1806 (Note: Section 1.)
Other legislation
Amends	Forth and Clyde and Monkland Canal Act 1790
Amended by	Forth and Clyde Navigation Act 1814; Forth and Clyde Navigation Act 1836
Relates to	Garnkirk and Glasgow Railway Act 1827

Text of statute as originally enacted

Forth and Clyde Navigation Act 1814
- Act of Parliament
- Parliament of the United Kingdom
- Long title: An Act to enlarge, alter and amend the Powers of the several Acts for making and maintaining the Forth and Clyde Navigation.
- Citation: 54 Geo. 3. c. cxcv
- Territorial extent: United Kingdom

Dates
- Royal assent: 14 July 1814
- Commencement: 14 July 1814 (Note: The Acts of Parliament (Commencement) Act 1793.)
Other legislation
Amends	Forth and Clyde and Monkland Canal Act 1790; Forth and Clyde Navigation Act 1806
Amended by	Forth and Clyde Navigation Act 1836
Relates to	Garnkirk and Glasgow Railway Act 1827

Status: Amended

Forth and Clyde Navigation Act 1820
- Act of Parliament
- Parliament of the United Kingdom
- Long title: An Act for altering and amending several Acts for making and maintaining the Forth and Clyde Navigation.
- Citation: 1 Geo. 4. c. xlviii
- Territorial extent: United Kingdom

Dates
- Royal assent: 8 July 1820
- Commencement: 8 July 1820
Other legislation
Amends	Forth and Clyde Navigation Act 1768; Forth and Clyde Navigation Company and Crinan Canal Company Act 1799
Amended by	Forth and Clyde Navigation Act 1836
Relates to	Garnkirk and Glasgow Railway Act 1827; Forth and Cart Junction Canal Act 1836

Text of statute as originally enacted

Forth and Clyde Navigation Act 1836
- Act of Parliament
- Parliament of the United Kingdom
- Long title: An Act for improving, enlarging, and extending the Forth and Clyde Navigation, and certain Harbours and Works belonging thereto and connected therewith; and for making and maintaining Two Branch Cuts or Canals from the said Navigation.
- Citation: 6 & 7 Will. 4. c. xliii
- Territorial extent: United Kingdom

Dates
- Royal assent: 19 May 1836
- Commencement: 19 May 1836
Other legislation
Amends	Forth and Clyde Navigation Act 1806; Forth and Clyde Navigation Act 1814; Forth and Clyde Navigation Act 1820
Amended by	Forth and Clyde Navigation Act 1841
Repealed by	21 June 1841
Relates to	Forth and Cart Junction Canal Act 1836

Status: Amended

Text of statute as originally enacted

Forth and Clyde Navigation Act 1841
- Act of Parliament
- Parliament of the United Kingdom
- Long title: An Act to consolidate, amend, and enlarge the Powers and Provisions of the several Acts relating to the Forth and Clyde Navigation.
- Citation: 4 & 5 Vict. c. lv
- Territorial extent: United Kingdom

Dates
- Royal assent: 21 June 1841
- Commencement: 21 June 1841
Other legislation
Amends	Forth and Clyde Navigation Act 1836
Repeals/revokes	Forth and Clyde Navigation Act 1768; Forth and Clyde Navigation Act 1771; Forth and Clyde Navigation Act 1773; Forth and Clyde Navigation Act 1784; Forth and Clyde Navigation Act 1787
Amended by	Forth and Clyde Navigation Act 1842; Forth and Clyde Navigation Act 1845; Forth and Clyde Navigation and Edinburgh and Glasgow Union Canal Act 1845; Forth and Clyde Navigation Act 1846; Forth and Clyde and Monkland Navigation Junction Act 1846; Forth and Clyde Navigation Amendment Act 1852; Forth and Clyde Navigation (Capital) Act 1866; Forth and Clyde Navigation (Castlecary and Kirkintilloch Road Bridges) Order Confirmation Act 1926; London, Midland and Scottish Railway Order Confirmation Act 1933

Status: Amended

Text of statute as originally enacted

The canal was authorised by the Forth and Clyde Navigation Act 1768 (8 Geo. 3. c. 63).

Priestley, writing in 1831, said:

The first act of parliament relating to this canal, received the royal assent on the 8 March 1768, and it is entitled, 'An Act for making and maintaining a navigable Canal from the Firth or River of Forth, at or near the mouth of the River Carron, in the county of Stirling, to the Firth or River of Clyde, at or near a place called Dalmuir Burnfoot, in the county of Dumbarton; and also a collateral Cut from the same to the city of Glasgow; and for making a navigable Cut or Canal of Communication from the Port or Harbour of Borrowstounness, to join the said Canal at or near the place where it will fall into the Firth of Forth.' The subscribers were incorporated by the name of "The Company of Proprietors of the Forth and Clyde Navigation," with power to raise among themselves the sum of £150,000, in fifteen hundred shares of £100 each, and an additional sum of £50,000, if necessary.

At first there were difficulties with securing the capital for the work, but soon, thanks in the main to investment by Sir Lawrence Dundas, 1st Baronet, "the execution of this canal proceeded with such rapidity, under the direction of [the engineer] Mr. Smeaton, that in two years and three quarters from the date of the first act, one half of the work was finished; when, in consequence of some misunderstanding between him and the proprietors, he declined any further connection with the work, which was shortly afterwards let to contractors, who however failed, and the canal was again placed under the direction of its original projector, who brought it to within six miles [10 km] of its proposed junction with the Clyde, when the work was stopped in 1775 for want of funds, and it continued at a stand for several years."

Numerous supplementary acts of Parliament preceded this period, and more followed, but the key to unlocking the problem was some creativity, in which "the Barons of the Court of Exchequer in Scotland, are, out of the money arising from the sale of forfeited estates, directed to lend the Forth and Clyde Navigation Company the sum of £50,000, by which they were enabled to resume their labours, under the direction of Mr. Robert Whitworth, an engineer possessing a well earned reputation". The work was completed on 28 July 1790.

The Forth and Clyde Navigation Committee was set up in Glasgow in (or before) 1787 and had several notable members: John Riddel (Lord Provost of Glasgow); John Campbell of Clathick; Patrick Colquhoun (Convenor and Superintendent); Robert Whitworth (engineer); Archibald Spiers; John Cumine (as collector of fees at east end) and James Loudon (as collector of fees at west end).

== Contemporary description ==
Priestley wrote in 1831,

Besides the fine rivers above-mentioned [the Forth and Clyde, the canal], is joined by the Edinburgh and Glasgow Union Canal, near Falkirk; with the Monkland and Kirkintilloch Railway at its summit, near the last-mentioned village; and with the Monkland Canal and the Garnkirk and Glasgow Railway, at Port Dundas, near the city of Glasgow.

This magnificent canal commences in the River Forth, in Grangemouth Harbour, and near to where the Carron empties itself into that river. Its course is parallel with the Carron, and in nearly a westwardly direction, passing to the north of the town of Falkirk, and thence to Red Bridge, where it quits the county of Stirling, and enters a detached portion of the shire of Dumbarton. Hence it passes to the south of Kilsyth, and runs along the south bank of the River Kelvin, and over the Luggie Water, by a fine stone aqueduct, at Kirkintilloch; it then approaches within little more than two miles [3 km] of the north-west quarter of the city of Glasgow, to which there is a branch communicating with the Monkland Canal at Port Dundas, near that city. The remaining part of the line is in a westwardly direction, crossing the Kelvin River by a noble aqueduct, and thence to the Clyde, into which, after running parallel with it for some distance, it locks down at Bowling's Bay, near Dalmuir Burnfoot.

The canal is thirty-five miles [56 km] in length, viz, from Grangemouth to the east end of the summit pool, is ten miles and three quarters [17 km], with a rise, from low water in the Forth, of 155 feet [47 m], by twenty locks. The summit level is sixteen miles [26 km] in length, and in the remainder of its course, there is a fall to low water, in the Clyde, at Bowling's Bay, of 156 feet [48 m], by nineteen locks.

The branch to the Monkland Canal at Glasgow is two miles and three quarters [4.4 km]; and there is another cut into the Carron River, at Carron Shore, in order to communicate with the Carron Iron Works.

Though this canal was originally constructed for vessels drawing 7 feet [2.1 m], yet by recent improvements, sea-borne craft of 10 feet [3.0 m] draught may now pass through it, from the Irish Sea to the German Ocean. The locks are 74 feet long and 20 wide [23 m × 6 m]; and upon its course are thirty-three draw-bridges, ten large aqueducts and thirty-three smaller ones; that over the Kelvin being 429 feet [131 m] long and 65 feet [20 m] above the surface of the stream. It is supplied with water from reservoirs; one of which, at Kilmananmuir, is seventy acres [28 ha], and 22 feet [6.7 m] deep at the sluice; and that at Kilsyth is fifty acres [20 ha] in extent, with 24 feet [7.3 m] water at its head.

== Passenger traffic ==
Between 1789 and 1803 the canal was used for trials of William Symington's steamboats, culminating in the Charlotte Dundas, the "first practical steamboat" built at the shipyard in Grangemouth by Alexander Hart.

Passenger boats ran on the canal from 1783, and in 1809 fast boats were introduced, running from Edinburgh to Falkirk in 3 hours 30 minutes, providing such comforts as food, drink and newspapers. By 1812 they carried 44,000 passengers, taking receipts of more than £3,450.

From 1828 there was a steamboat service, operated by Thomas Grahame's boat Cupid.

== Construction ==
The canal was designed by John Smeaton. Construction started in 1768 and after delays due to funding problems was completed in 1790. To mark the opening a hogshead of water taken from the Forth was emptied into the Clyde at Bowling to symbolise the union of the eastern and western seas. The geologist James Hutton became very involved in the canal between 1767 and 1774; he contributed his geological knowledge, made extended site inspections, and acted both as a shareholder and as a member of the management committee. The Union Canal was then constructed to link the eastern end of the canal to Edinburgh.

== Changes of ownership ==
Forth and Clyde Navigation Act 1842
- Act of Parliament
- Parliament of the United Kingdom
- Long title: An Act for altering and amending an Act of the Fourth and Fifth Year of Her present Majesty, intituled "An Act to consolidate, amend, and enlarge the Powers and Provisions of the several Acts relating to the Forth and Clyde Navigation;" for enlarging and making Reservoirs for better supplying the said Navigation with Water; and for enabling the Company of Proprietors of the said Navigation to purchase and acquire the Forth and Cart Junction Canal.
- Citation: 5 & 6 Vict. c. xli
- Territorial extent: United Kingdom

Dates
- Royal assent: 18 June 1842
- Commencement: 18 June 1842
Other legislation
Amends	Forth and Clyde Navigation Act 1841
Amended by	Forth and Clyde Navigation Act 1845; Forth and Clyde Navigation and Edinburgh and Glasgow Union Canal Act 1845; Forth and Clyde and Monkland Navigation Junction Act 1846

Status: Amended

Text of statute as originally enacted

Forth and Clyde Navigation Act 1845
- Act of Parliament
- Parliament of the United Kingdom
- Long title: An Act for altering and enlarging the Powers and Provisions of the Acts relating to the Forth and Clyde Navigation.
- Citation: 8 & 9 Vict. c. iii
- Territorial extent: United Kingdom

Dates
- Royal assent: 8 May 1845
- Commencement: 8 May 1845
Other legislation
Amends	Forth and Clyde Navigation Act 1841; Forth and Clyde Navigation Act 1842
Amended by	Forth and Clyde and Monkland Navigation Junction Act 1846; Forth and Clyde Navigation Act 1846

Status: Amended

Forth and Clyde Navigation Act 1846
- Act of Parliament
- Parliament of the United Kingdom
- Long title: An Act to enable the Company of Proprietors of the Forth and Clyde Navigation to extend and enlarge the Basin at Bowling Bay, and to make and maintain certain other Works in connexion therewith; and to alter and amend the Acts relating to the said Navigation.
- Citation: 9 & 10 Vict. c. ccclxxxiv
- Territorial extent: United Kingdom

Dates
- Royal assent: 18 August 1846
- Commencement: 18 August 1846
Other legislation
Amends	Forth and Clyde Navigation Act 1841; Forth and Clyde Navigation Act 1845
Amended by	London, Midland and Scottish Railway Order Confirmation Act 1933

Status: Amended

Text of statute as originally enacted

Caledonian Railway and Forth and Clyde Navigation Companies Act 1867
- Act of Parliament
- Parliament of the United Kingdom
- Long title: An Act for vesting in the Caledonian Railway Company the Undertaking of the Company of Proprietors of the Forth and Clyde Navigation; and for other Purposes.
- Citation: 30 & 31 Vict. c. cvi
- Territorial extent: United Kingdom

Dates
- Royal assent: 20 June 1867
- Commencement: 20 June 1867

Status: Current legislation

Text of statute as originally enacted

In 1842 an act of Parliament, the Forth and Clyde Navigation Act 1842 (5 & 6 Vict. c. xli) was obtained authorising the Forth and Clyde Canal Company to take over the Forth and Cart Canal.

The Caledonian Railway and Forth and Clyde Navigation Companies Act 1867 (30 & 31 Vict. c. cvi) authorised the Caledonian Railway to take over the Forth and Clyde Canal. In the meantime the canal company had itself built a railway branch line to Grangemouth Dock, which it owned.

The canal was nationalised in 1948, along with the railway companies, and control passed to the British Transport Commission. In 1962, the British Transport Commission was wound up, and control passed to the British Waterways Board; subsequently Scottish Canals took control.

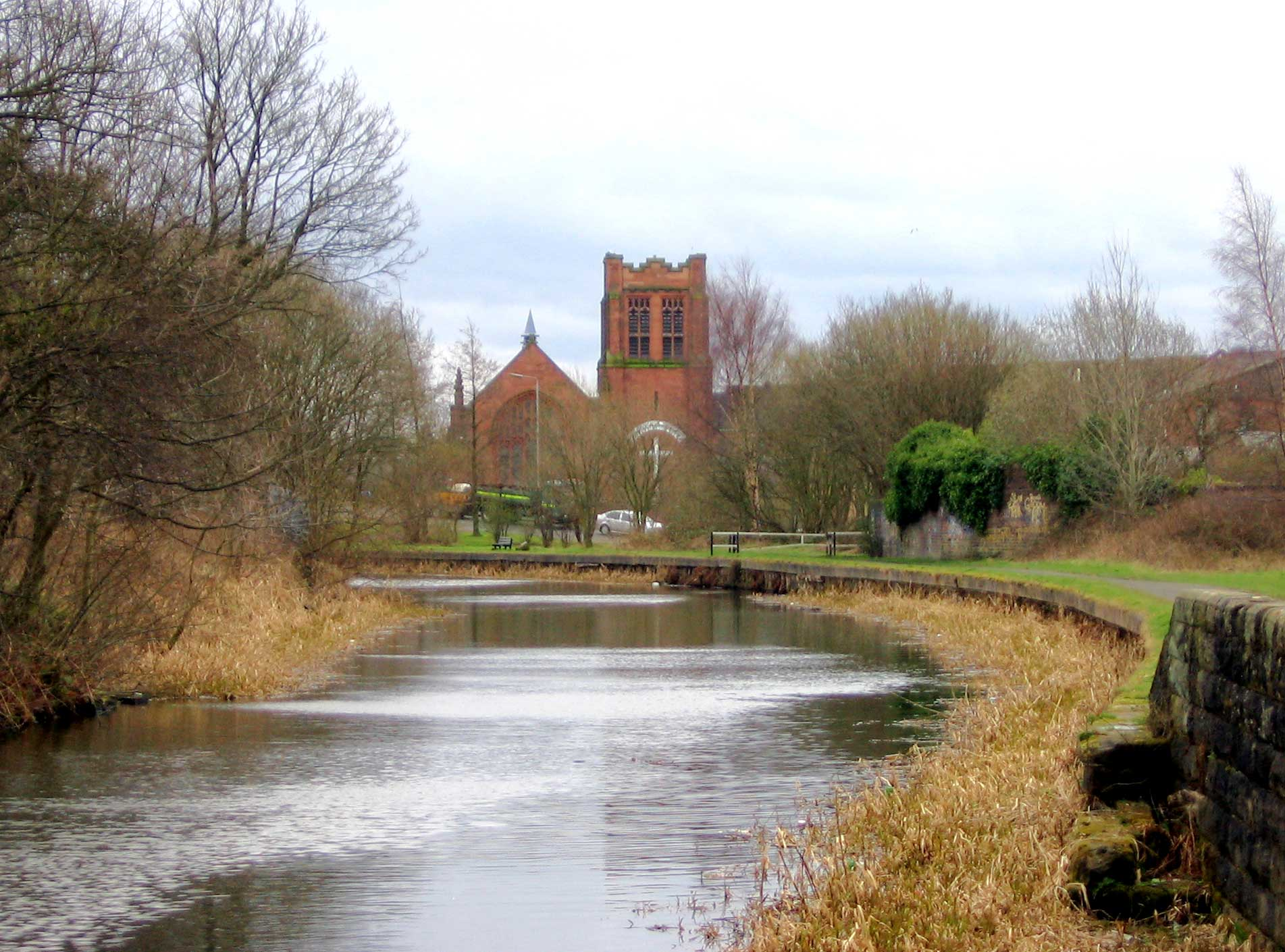
The branch within Glasgow from Maryhill to Port Dundas, showing Ruchill Church.

== Run down and revival ==
Forth and Clyde Canal (Extinguishment of Rights of Navigation) Act 1962 (Note: Section 2.)
- Act of Parliament
- Parliament of the United Kingdom
- Long title: An Act to extinguish any right of navigation on the Forth and Clyde Canal, and the obligations upon the British Transport Commission to keep that canal open and to maintain it for purposes of navigation.
- Citation: 10 & 11 Eliz. 2. c. 16
- Territorial extent: United Kingdom

Dates
- Royal assent: 29 March 1962
- Commencement: 1 January 1963
- Repealed: 16 June 1977
Other legislation
Repealed by	Statute Law (Repeals) Act 1977

Status: Repealed

Text of statute as originally enacted

In 1963 the canal was closed rather than construct a motorway crossing, and so it became disused and semi-derelict. Canal locks in the Falkirk area on the Union Canal near the connection to the Forth and Clyde canal had been filled in and built over in the 1930s.

As part of the millennium celebrations in 2000, National Lottery funds were used to regenerate both canals. A boatlifting device, the Falkirk Wheel, was built to connect the two canals and once more allow boats to travel from the Clyde or Glasgow to Edinburgh, with a new canal connection to the River Carron and hence the River Forth. The Falkirk Wheel opened on 27 May 2002 and is now a tourist attraction.

When the canal was reopened, the Port Dundas branch was reinstated from Stockingfield Junction, where it leaves the main line, to Speirs Wharf, where further progress was blocked by culverts created as part of the M8 Motorway construction and the abortive Maryhill Motorway. A connection from there to Pinkston Basin, which once formed the terminus of the Monkland Canal, was later achieved by the construction of 330 yards (300 m) of new canal and two locks, lowering the level of the canal to enable it to pass beneath existing structures. The project cost £5.6 million, and the first lock and intermediate basin were opened on 29 September 2006. The lock was named Speaker Martin's Lock, after Michael Martin MP, the speaker in the House of Commons who performed the opening ceremony. Opening of the second lock was delayed by a dispute over land ownership.

== Forth and Clyde Canal Society ==
The Forth and Clyde Canal Society is a waterway society on the Forth and Clyde Canal in the Central Lowlands of Scotland. It was formed in 1980 to "campaign for the Forth and Clyde's preservation, restoration and development"

According to the Forth and Clyde Canal Society's website, their current aim is "To promote the canal and to ensure its success".

The Society's campaigning included a petition of over 30,000 signatures for the reopening of the canal, which was then put in place under the Millennium Link project which commenced work in 1999.

The society currently has three boats which are used as trip-boats, charter vessels and for members cruises along the canal.

== Locks ==
There are 39 locks on the Forth & Clyde Canal, as follows:

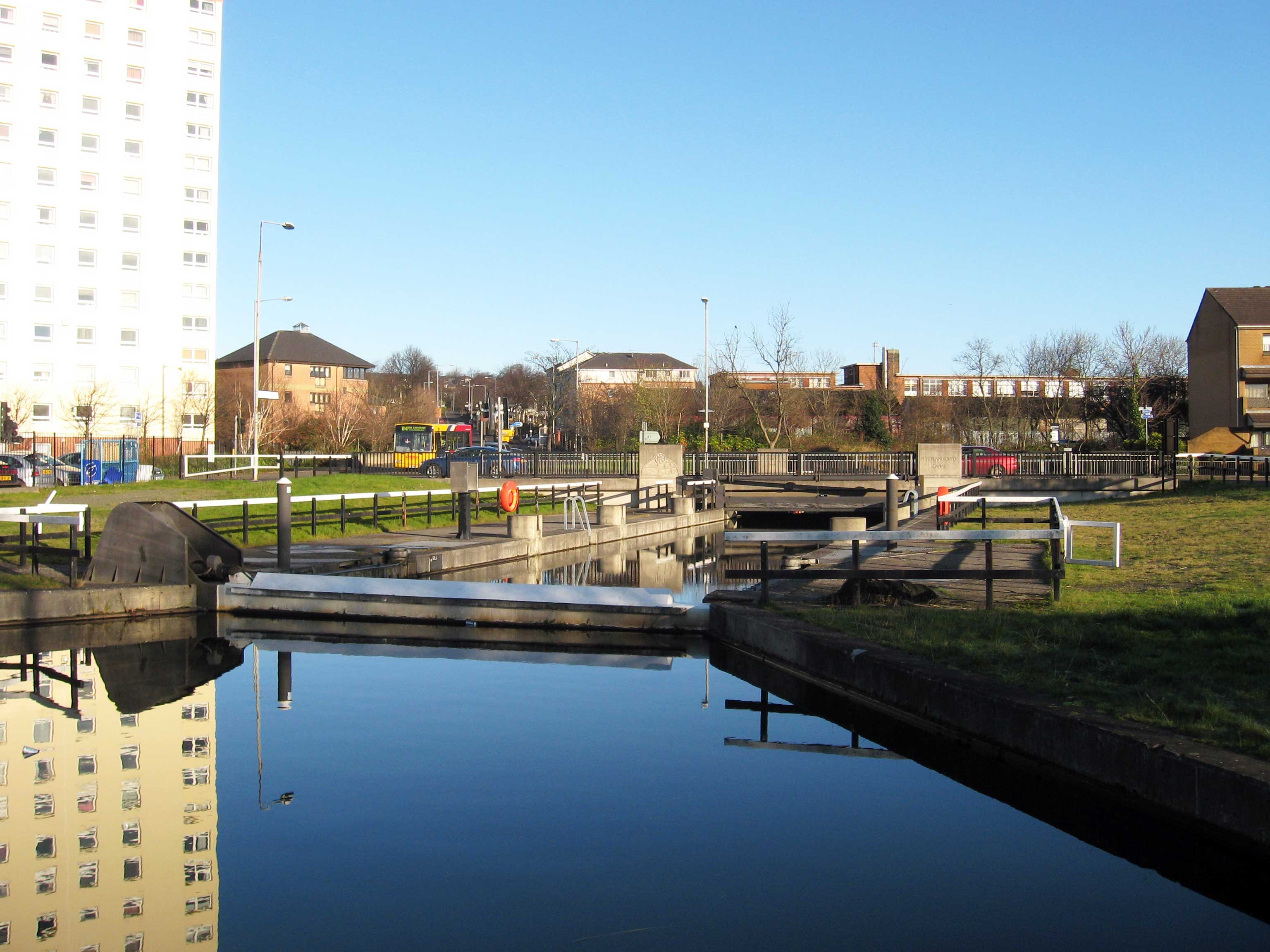
The unique Drop Lock at Dalmuir takes boats below a fixed bridge.

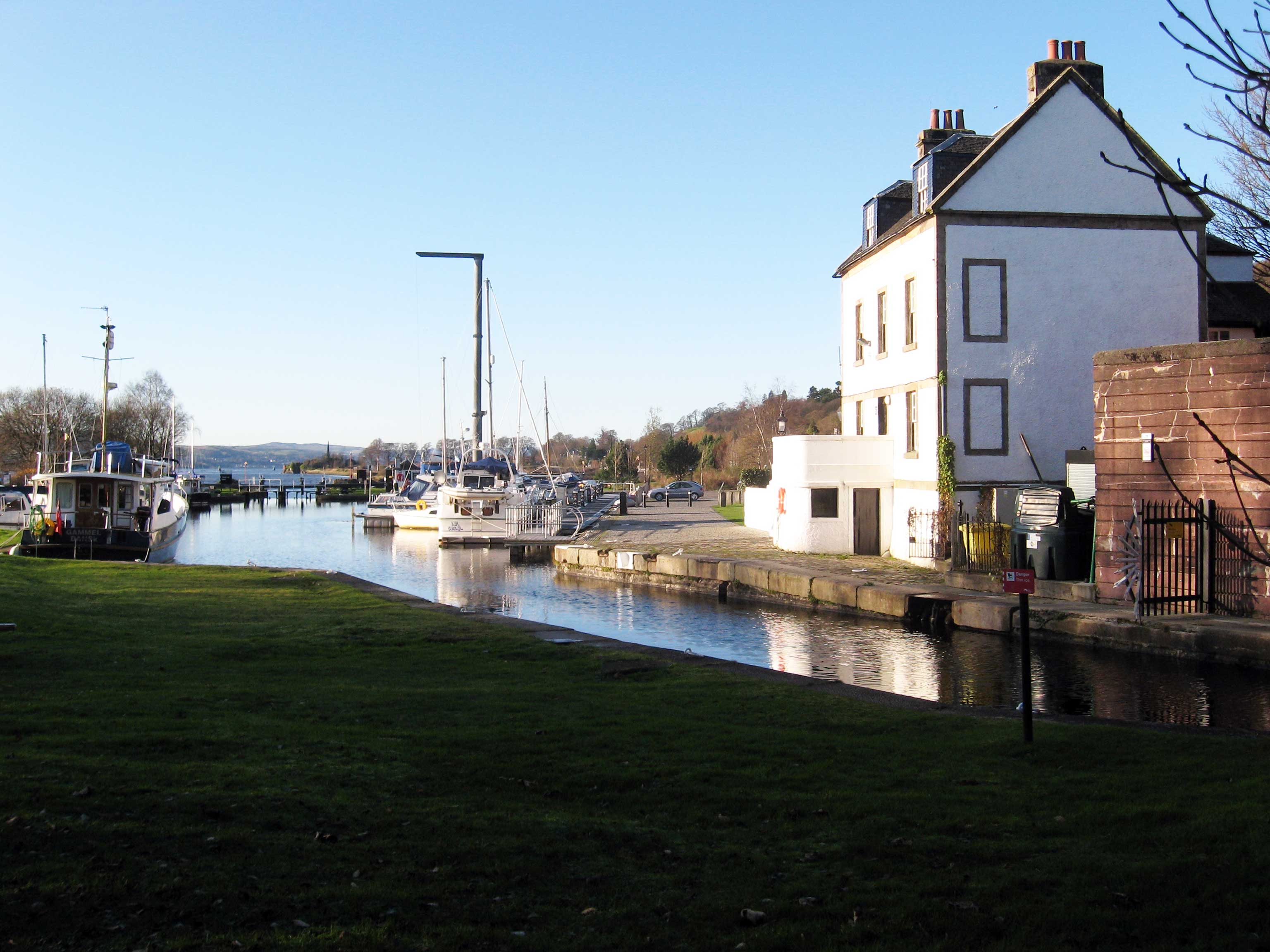
At Bowling the canal widens to a basin at the sea lock to the River Clyde.

- 1 – New River Carron Sea Lock (The Helix Canal Extension – beyond The Kelpies)
- 2 – Basin Moorings (Sea Lock)
- 3 – Carron Cut Lock
- 4 – Abbotshaugh Lock
- 5 – Bainsford Lock
- 6 – Grahamston Iron Works Lock
- 7 – Merchiston Lock
- 8 – Merers Lock
- 9 – Camelon Railway Lock
- 10 – Camelon Lock
- 11 – Rosebank Lock
- 12 – Camelon Lock No. 12
- 13 – Camelon Lock No. 13
- 14 – Camelon Lock No. 14
- 15 – Falkirk Wheel
- 16 – Falkirk Bottom Lock No. 16
- 17 – Underwood Lock No. 17
- 18 – Allandale Lock No. 18
- 19 – Castlecary Lock No. 19
- 20 – Wyndford Lock No. 20 (summit level)
- 21 – Maryhill Top Lock No. 21 (summit level)
- 22 – Maryhill Lock
- 23 – Maryhill Lock
- 24 – Maryhill Lock
- 25 – Maryhill Bottom Lock No. 25
- 26 – Kelvindale (Temple Lock No. 26)
- 27 – Temple Lock No. 27
- 28 – Cloberhill Top Lock No. 28
- 29 – Cloberhill Middle Lock No. 29
- 30 – Cloberhill Bottom Lock No. 30
- 31 – Cloberhill Lock No. 31
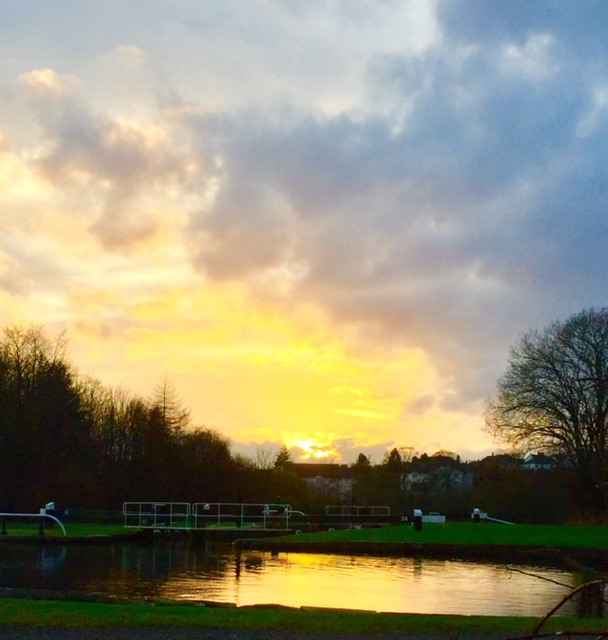
- Maryhill Locks at sunset
  32 – Cloberhill Lock No. 32
- 33 – Boghouse Top Lock No. 33
- 34 – Boghouse Middle Lock No. 34
- 35 – Boghouse Lower Lock. 35
- 36 – No. 36
- Drop Lock – Dalmuir Drop Lock (constructed recently to take navigation below bridge)
- 37 – Old Kilpatrick
- 38 – Dalnottar Lock No. 37
- 39 – Bowling Lock No. 38

The overall ruling dimensions are length: 68 feet 7 inches (20.90 m); beam: 19 feet 9 inches (6.02 m); draught: 6 feet 0 inches (1.83 m); headroom: 9 feet 1 inch (2.77 m), but at the western end larger vessels may use the Bowling basin.

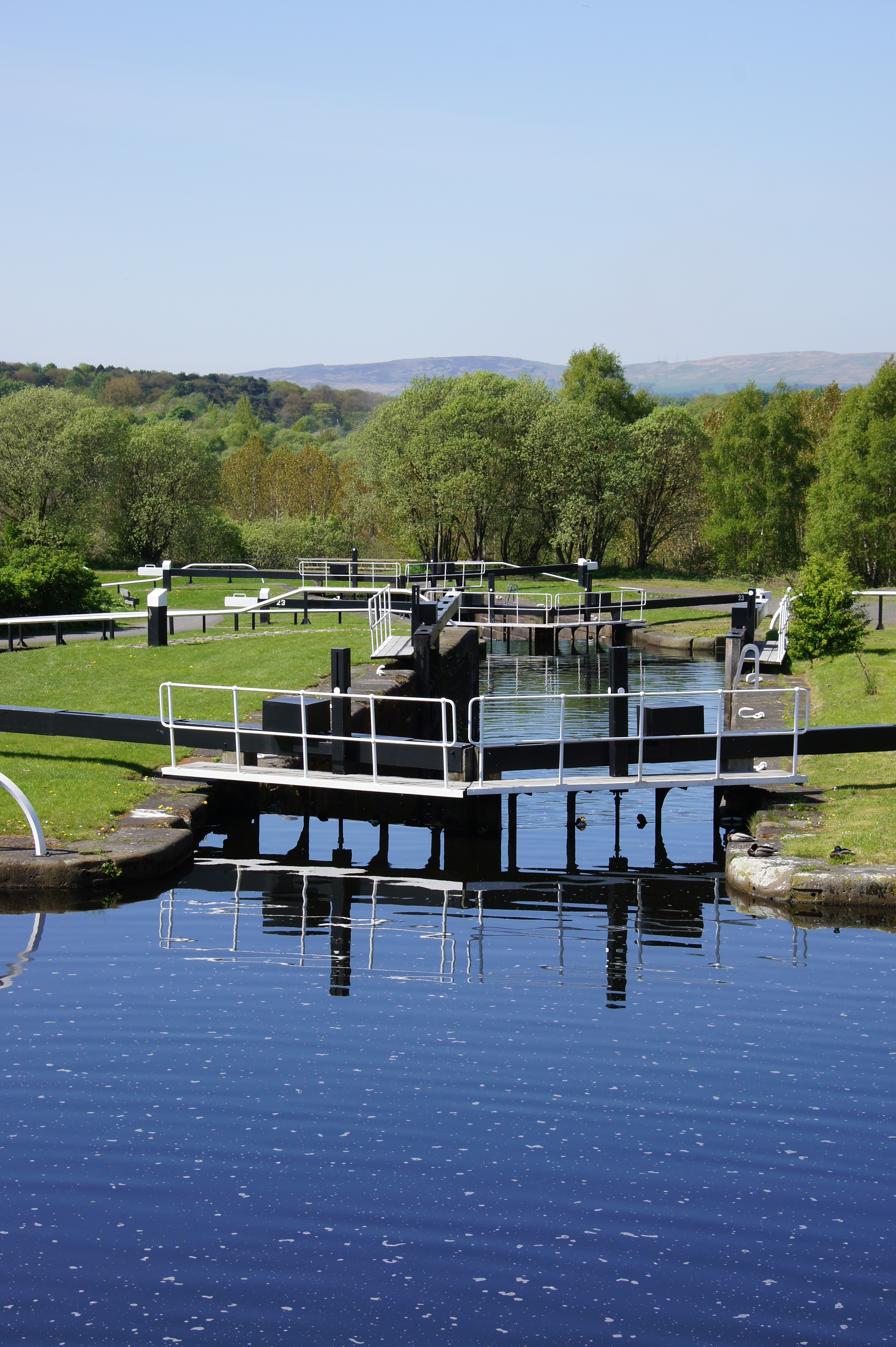
- Maryhill Locks
  Data sourced from www.scottishcanals.co.uk

== See also ==
- Auchinstarry and its new basin, a £1.2M regeneration project
- Forth to Firth Canal Pathway
- Falkirk Helix
- John Muir Way
- World Canals Conference
- Donald's Quay
- Canal safety gates
- Stockingfield Junction
