= Port Dundas =

Area of Glasgow, Scotland (UK)

Coordinates: 55°52′23.87″N 4°15′10.97″W

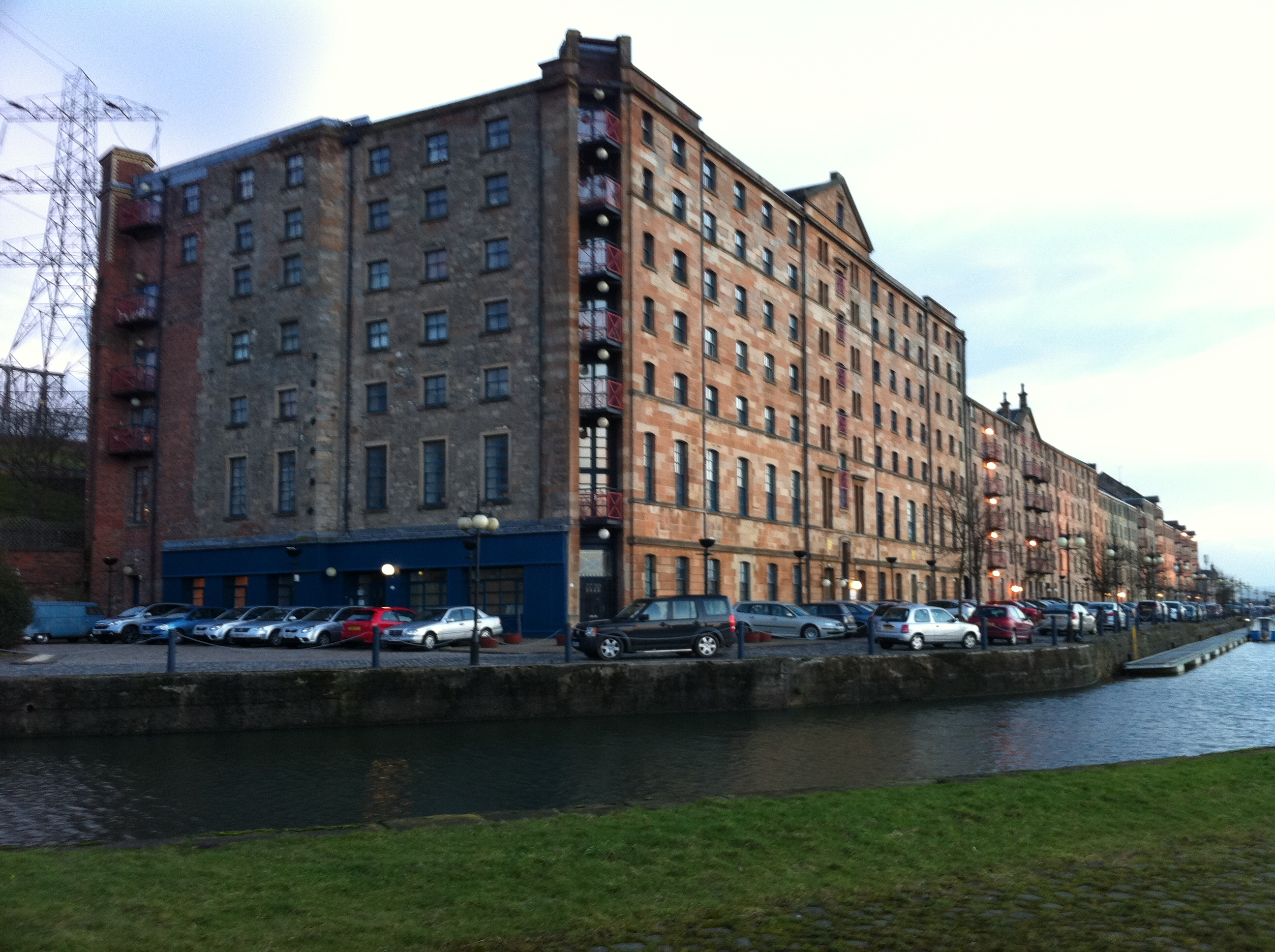
Speirs Wharf was originally the offices of the Forth and Clyde Navigation Company and the City of Glasgow Grain Mills and Stores built for John Currie & Co. in 1851. The buildings were converted in 1989 into 150 loft-style residential apartments, a private leisure centre, and 19 commercial units.

Port Dundas is an area of Glasgow, Scotland, located 1 mile (1.6 km) to the north of the city centre. It lies to the north of Cowcaddens, and to the west of Sighthill, with Hamiltonhill and Possilpark to the north-west.

== History ==
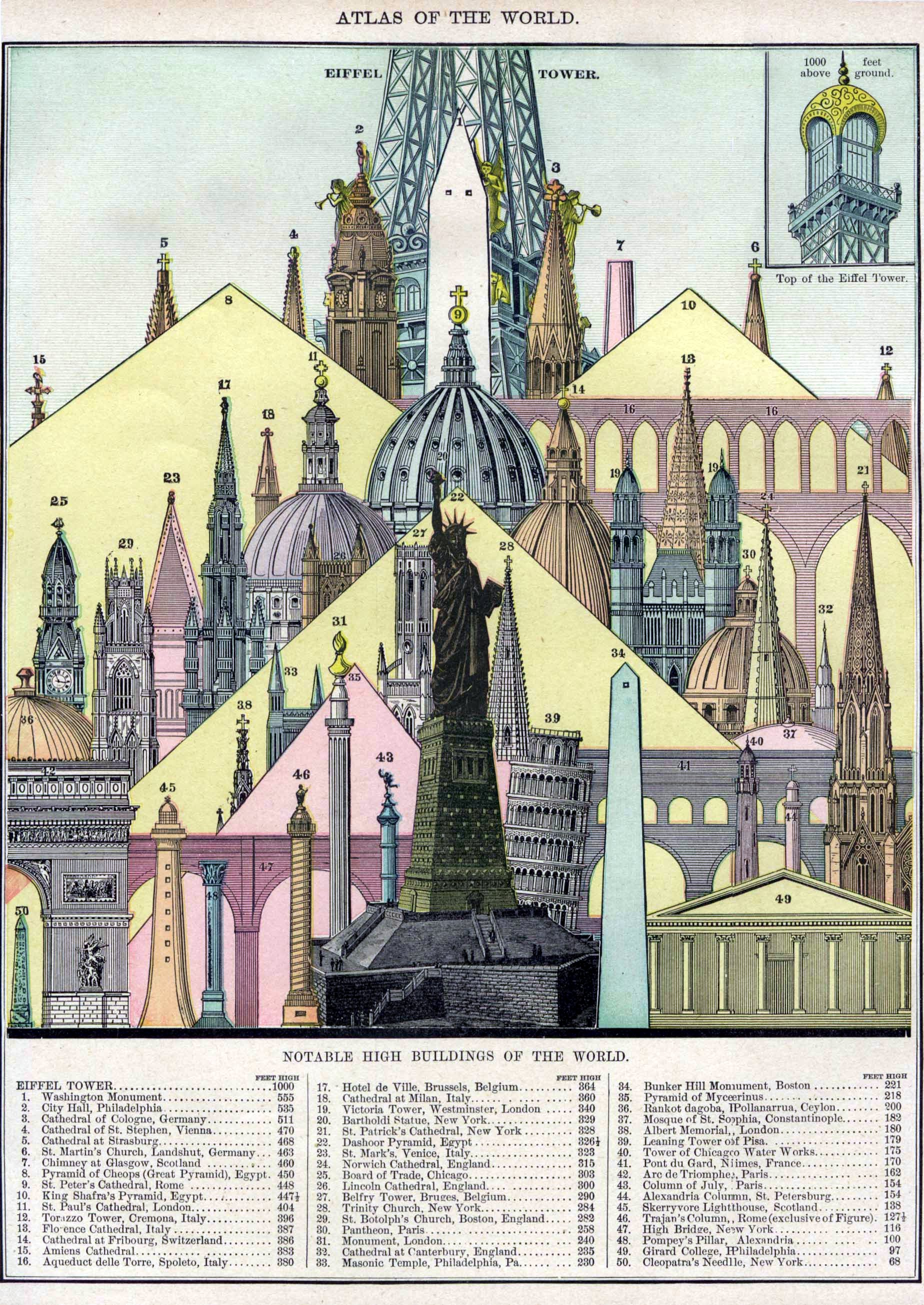
Illustration of 'Notable High Buildings' in Rand McNally's' Universal Atlas of The World (1896), featuring the Port Dundas chimney at #7

The Port Dundas terminus was established at One Hundred Acre Hill between 1786 and 1790 and was named after Sir Lawrence Dundas, one of the major backers of the Forth and Clyde Canal Company. Port Dundas formed the terminus of a branch of the Forth and Clyde Canal in the centre of Glasgow, linking to the adjacent Monkland Canal. It became an industrial centre in the 19th century, with textile mills, chemical works, granaries, distilleries, glassworks, iron foundries, power stations and engineering works all operating in the area. In 1859, a brick chimney was built at Port Dundas for F. Townsend. At 454 feet (138 m) it was the tallest chimney in the world at the time, with an outside diameter of 32 feet (9.8 m) at ground level. It was demolished in 1928.

=== Pinkston Power Station ===
In 1900, the coal-fired Pinkston Power Station was built at Port Dundas to generate electricity for the Glasgow Corporation Tramways network. Equipped with Belliss and Morcom generator sets, Glasgow Corporation had decided to electrify the network by 1901 for the opening of the International Exhibition at Kelvingrove Park. A large cooling tower was added in 1954 and was the largest in Europe at the time. After passing to the South of Scotland Electricity Board in 1958, it was decommissioned in the 1960s, with the cooling tower being demolished in 1977; the first chimney was demolished on a Sunday in April 1978, and the other chimney came down the following Sunday.

=== Industrial decline and regeneration ===
Industry in the area declined through the 20th century. The Monkland Canal was closed to navigation in 1952, and the Forth and Clyde in 1963. Charles Tennant's St Rollox Chemical Works, at one time the largest chemical manufacturer in the world closed its plant to the east of Port Dundas in 1964. The M8 motorway was constructed immediately to the south, over the route of the Monkland Canal, in the 1970s, obstructing access to the canal basin. Early in the 21st century, the Forth and Clyde Canal was restored as a leisure attraction, and the canal and warehouses at Port Dundas were restored as apartments.

=== Port Dundas Grain Distillery ===
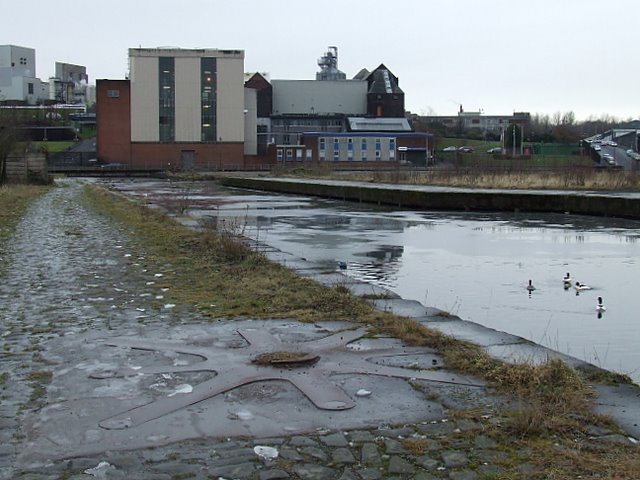
Diageo Port Dundas Grain Distillery.

The area is the site of a former large Scotch Grain distillery, which produced 39 million litres of spirit each year on a 21-acre (85,000 m^{2}) site until being closed in 2010. Originally there were two distilleries in the locality, the first was established in 1811 by Daniel McFarlane. Two years later the second one was established by Brown, Gourlie & Co. During 1845 Coffey stills for the manufacture of grain whisky were installed in both distilleries.

Both distilleries merged in the 1860s and later became part of the Distillers Company in 1877. They were destroyed by fire in 1903 but were rebuilt and reopened in 1913, and rebuilt again in 1916 after being severely damaged by another fire. The distillery was closed for the duration of World War II. A large modernisation programme was undertaken during the 1970s, when a new grain intake, spirit store, still house, boiler house and dark grains plant were opened.

The Port Dundas Grain Distillery and adjacent Dundashill Cooperage, which manufactured Hogshead casks and dates back to 1770, are currently owned by Diageo, and the distillery's large flue gas stack dominates the skyline of North Glasgow. It produced grain whisky used in the Johnnie Walker, J&B, Bell's, Black & White, Vat 69, Haig and White Horse blended whisky brands owned by Diageo. On 1 July 2009, Diageo announced the closure of the Port Dundas distillery, with all production shifting to the company's other Scottish Grain distillery at Cameron Bridge in Fife, as well as the North British Distillery in Edinburgh, which is jointly owned by Diageo and The Edrington Group.

Records
Preceded by Tennant's Stalk	World's tallest chimney 138.4 m (454 ft); 1859–1889	Succeeded by Halsbrücker Esse
