= Ruchill =

District of Glasgow, Scotland

Coordinates: 55.886871°N 4.270316°W

Ruchill: Scots: Rochhull
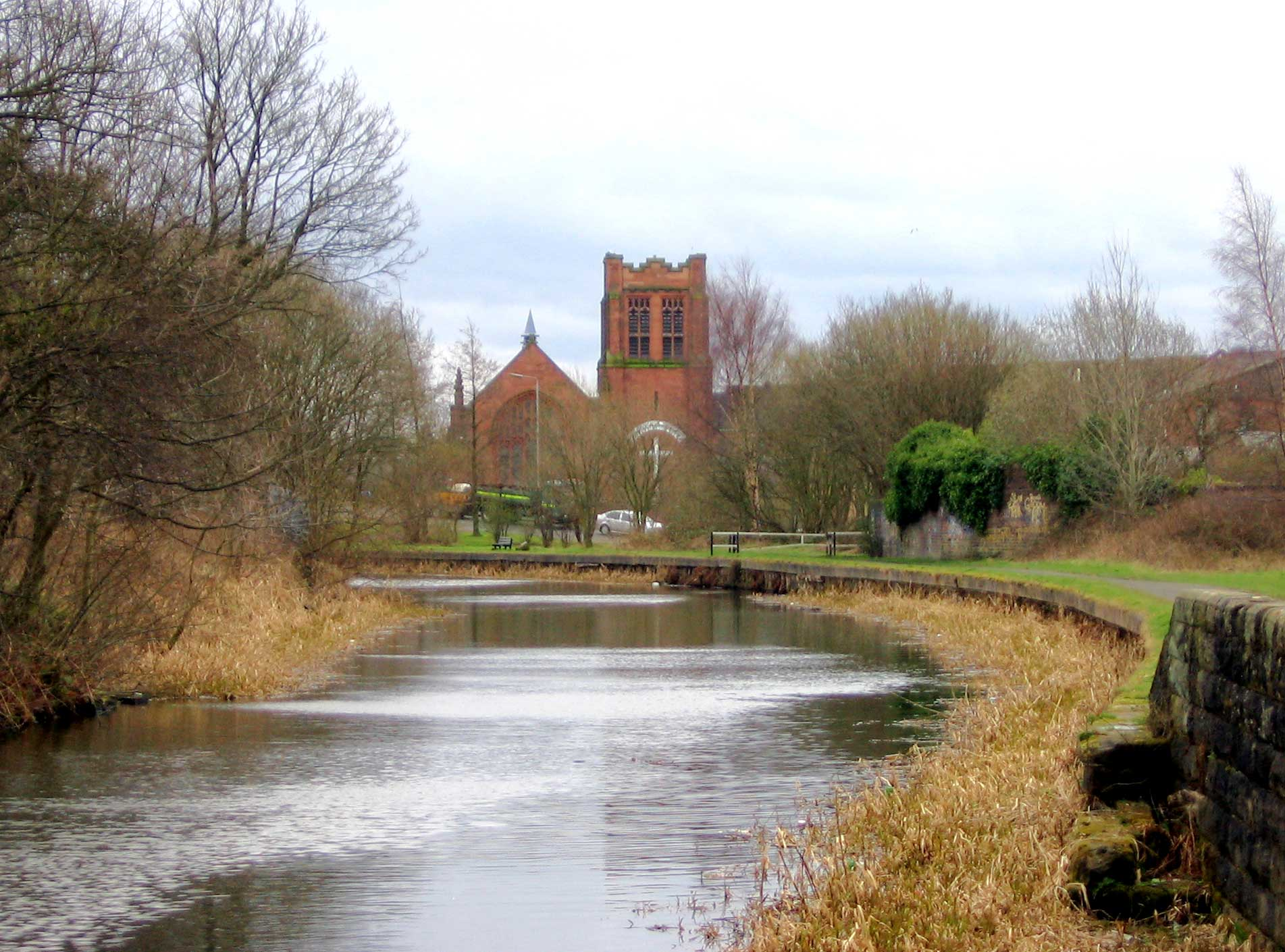
- A branch of the Forth and Clyde Canal runs south from Maryhill through Ruchill to Port Dundas: Ruchill Church stands beside the canal.

- Location within Glasgow
- OS grid reference: NS581683
- Council area: Glasgow City Council
- Lieutenancy area: Glasgow
- Country: Scotland
- Sovereign state: United Kingdom
- Post town: GLASGOW
- Postcode district: G20
- Dialling code: 0141
- Police: Scotland
- Fire: Scottish
- Ambulance: Scottish
- UK Parliament: Glasgow North
- Scottish Parliament: Glasgow Maryhill and Springburn

Ruchill (/ˈrʌxˌhɪl/) is a district in the city of Glasgow, Scotland. It lies within the Canal Ward of north Glasgow in the Ruchill Community Council area between the Maryhill and Possilpark and North Kelvinside areas of the city.

It had previously been characterised by a high degree of deprivation and social problems. However, from the late 1990s much of the poorer-quality housing stock has been cleared to be replaced by newly built housing association and owner-occupied homes, improving much of the area's character.

One part of the area that is largely unchanged is High Ruchill, which unlike the rest of the area was never made up of tenemental properties, but semi-detached housing instead. This part of Ruchill also never suffered the same concentration of social problems as the rest of the area.

The Ruchill area is now connected to the communities in Maryhill and Gishochill via the Stockingfield bridge, over the forth and Clyde canal at the Stockingfield Junction. The bridge pays tribute to Ruchill's history through mosaics which decorate the bridge's panoramic viewing point.

== Ruchill Hospital ==
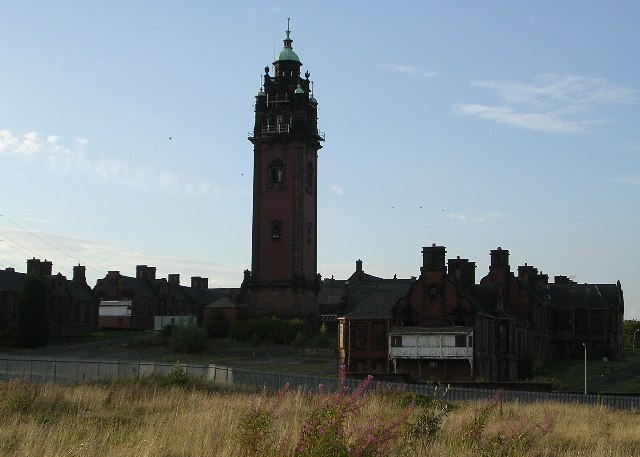
The remaining derelict buildings of Ruchill Hospital in 2005.

The area was formerly the site of Ruchill Hospital, an infectious diseases facility which closed in 1998.

== Ruchill Park ==
Ruchill Park opened in 1892, is prominent in the area, and is one of many public parks in the city. The poor quality of the soil and its high, exposed situation was not ideal for a public park, but under the direction of Parks Superintendent James Whitton the area was transformed. The park's best known feature is the panoramic view of Glasgow and its surroundings which can be obtained from the top of the hill. This is topped by an artificial mound (with a flagpole) constructed from 24,000 cartloads of soil from the construction of the adjacent Ruchill Hospital. It is known locally as "Ben Whitton". During WW2 an anti-aircraft gun was positioned in the park and was used to defend the area during the Clydebank Blitz.

== Ruchill Golf Course ==
Ruchill Golf Course was popular for many years with golfers in the city, but in 2000 the city council closed the facility and money was issued by council to establish redevelopment plans. The golf course has a former railway tunnel running under it, named the "miley" by locals as it was around a mile long. It was formerly part of the Lanarkshire and Dunbartonshire Railway, linking Maryhill Central railway station to Possil railway station. There was also a tunnel linking Ruchill to the Lambhill area. The tunnel ran under the Forth & Clyde Canal, which ran through the golf course. This tunnel is known locally as the Halloween Pen. It was not a railway tunnel but a tunnel used to herd sheep through in the past when the area was still relatively rural.

On 17 September 2009 Ruchill Golf Course was reopened by Colin Montgomerie. However, use of the club house and regular play did not commence until after the open evening on 1 April 2010. The course – now officially termed the "Ruchill Community Golf Facility" is now run by Culture and Sport Glasgow, part of Glasgow City Council, and is a nine-hole course, designed with Colin Montgomerie's input, apparently suited for developing and established players. The Ruchill course closed in October 2019.

== Other amenities ==
Ruchill Church Hall, designed by the celebrated architect Charles Rennie Mackintosh is located to the west of the area, close to Maryhill Road and the Forth and Clyde Canal; Ruchill Parish Church, designed by Neil Campbell Duff, is located beside it.

A new footbridge over the canal connecting the area with Gilshochill and providing a better link to Maryhill, was installed at Stockingfield Junction in 2022.
