= Maryhill =

Area of Glasgow, Scotland

Maryhill: Scottish Gaelic: Cnoc Màiri; Scots: Maryhull
- Maryhill from above

- Flag

- Location within the Glasgow City council area Location within Scotland
- OS grid reference: NS563691
- Council area: Glasgow City
- Lieutenancy area: Glasgow
- Country: Scotland
- Sovereign state: United Kingdom
- Post town: GLASGOW
- Postcode district: G20
- Dialling code: 0141
- Police: Scotland
- Fire: Scottish
- Ambulance: Scottish
- UK Parliament: Glasgow North
- Scottish Parliament: Glasgow Maryhill and Springburn

Maryhill (Scottish Gaelic: Cnoc Màiri) is an area in the north-west of Glasgow in Scotland. A former independent burgh and the heart of an eponymous local authority ward, its territory is bisected by Maryhill Road, part of the A81 road which runs for a distance of roughly three miles (five kilometres) between Glasgow city centre and the suburban town of Bearsden.

The far north west of the area is served by Maryhill railway station.

== History ==
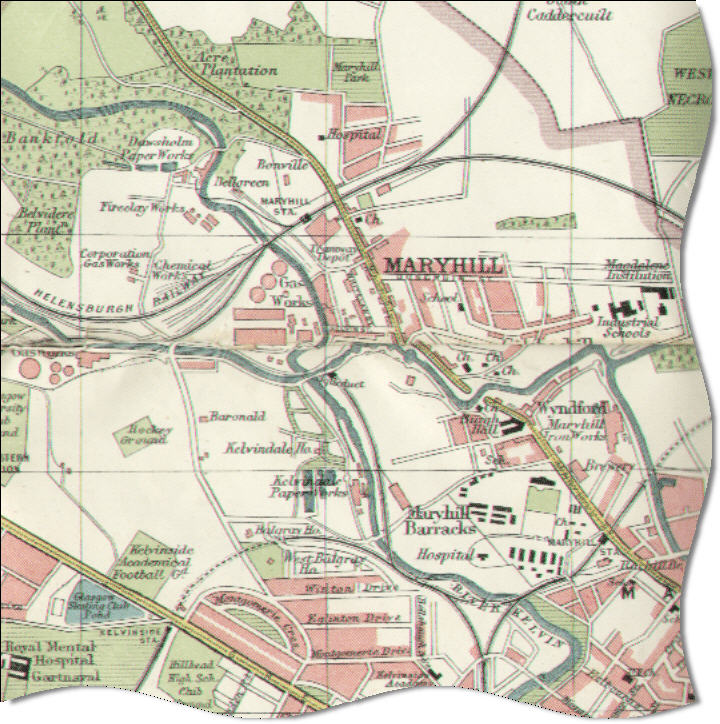
Map of the Maryhill area, circa 1923.

Hew Hill, the Laird, or Lord, of Gairbraid, had no male heir and so he left his estate to his daughter, Mary Hill (1730–1809). She married Robert Graham of Dawsholm in 1763, but they had no income from trade or commerce and had to make what they could from the estate. They founded coalmines on the estate but they proved to be wet and unprofitable.

On 8 March 1768 Parliament approved the cutting of the Forth and Clyde Canal through their estate, which provided some much-needed money. The canal reached the estate in 1775, but the canal company had run out of money and work stopped for eight years. The Government granted funds from forfeited Jacobite estates to start it again and the crossing of the River Kelvin became the focus for massive construction activity. Five locks, the great Kelvin Aqueduct and, between two of the locks, a dry dock boatyard were built. A village too began to grow up and the Grahams provided more land for its development; Robert Graham attached one condition that was to immortalise the heiress of Gairbraid, his wife and the last in line of centuries of Hills of Gairbraid after the death of her father Hew Hill. The then village was to be "in all times called the town of MaryHill".

The new canal waterway attracted industries including boat-building, saw-milling and ironfounding to its banks within Mary's estate. By 1830 the scattered houses had grown to form a large village with a population of 3000. The building of the Glasgow, Dumbarton and Helensburgh Railway passing through Maryhill in the 1850s. The proximity of the Loch Katrine pipeline led to further growth, and in 1856 Maryhill became a burgh in its own right. It was absorbed into the boundaries of the city of Glasgow in 1891.

Part of the Antonine Wall runs through Maryhill, in the Maryhill Park area, where there is the site of a Roman fort adjoining the wall in nearby Bearsden. A Roman bath-house may still be seen there.

Maryhill had one of the first Temperance Society in Scotland after lawlessness filled the streets in the Victorian era.

Maryhill also boasts one of Glasgow's original Carnegie libraries, designed by the Inverness architect James Robert Rhind.

Maryhill Barracks was opened in 1872 and once dominated the area that is now the Wyndford housing estate. It was home to the Scots Greys and the Highland Light Infantry, and held Adolf Hitler's second-in-command Rudolf Hess during World War II after his supposed "peace mission" to the UK [he crashed his plane into a field]. The barracks were decommissioned in 1959 and demolished in 1961. However the Territorial Army unit, the 52nd Lowland, 6th Battalion, the Royal Regiment of Scotland continues to be based at the adjacent Walcheren Barracks.

The Glasgow Industrial School for Girls moved to Maryhill in 1882.

== Geography ==
The Maryhill district has several sub-districts, such as Acre, Botany, Dawsholm Park, Firhill, Gairbraid, Gilshochill, Maryhill Park, North Kelvinside, Queen's Cross, St George's Cross, Cadder, Summerston, Woodside and Wyndford.

== Governance ==
Maryhill is part of the Glasgow Maryhill and Springburn constituency in the Scottish Parliament and of Maryhill Ward (Ward 15) on Glasgow City Council. Glasgow Maryhill was a constituency represented in the House of Commons of the Parliament of the United Kingdom from 1918 until 2005 when it was subsumed into the new Glasgow North constituency.

Maryhill Ward is a multi-member Ward and has three Councillors: Abdul Bostani (SNP), Marie Garrity (Labour) and Franny Scally (SNP). The MSP for Glasgow Kelvin and Maryhill is Bob Doris and the MP for Glasgow North is Martin Rhodes.

== Demography ==
The population of the Glasgow Maryhill and Springburn constituency was 73,493 as of 2015 and the population as of 2013 of the Maryhill/Kelvin Ward was 27,125. Although the population is predominantly White Scottish/British (22,784), Maryhill is ethnically diverse. The largest of the other ethnic groups are Chinese and African (664 and 660 respectively).

== Economy ==
Although historically a working class area, as of 2013 there are more people employed in professional services than in manufacturing, construction and utilities in Maryhill. As of 2011, the working-age population (16–64) was 18,770. Of these, 13,237 were economically active.

According to the Glasgow Centre for Population Health, the level of income deprivation in Glasgow North West is 24%, while the figure for Maryhill is slightly higher at 25%.

== Housing ==
Many areas in the north of Glasgow are below the normal UK standard of living. However, not all areas of North Glasgow are in poor condition. Maryhill is in the north west of the city, and consists of well maintained traditionally "Glaswegian" sandstone tenements with the traditional high ceilings as well as many large Victorian town houses. There are also large housing association-run housing estates.

The district contains the Wyndford and Gairbraid estate, a housing estate with a population of almost 5,000, containing a number of high-rise housing blocks, the highest four reaching heights of 26 storeys. These are intermixed with lower residences to create an estate of significant housing contrast and variety.

In June 2024, planning consent was submitted to Glasgow City Council for the redevelopment of part of the area, specifically for new homes on waste ground between Gilshochill and Summerston where derelict mid-20th century apartment blocks and terraced houses had been demolished a decade earlier.

== Sport ==
Maryhill is the home of Firhill Stadium, which has been the home ground of Scottish Championship club Partick Thistle since 1909. Originally from the burgh of Partick, the club moved to the Maryhill area in 1909 after struggling to find a new home nearer Partick.

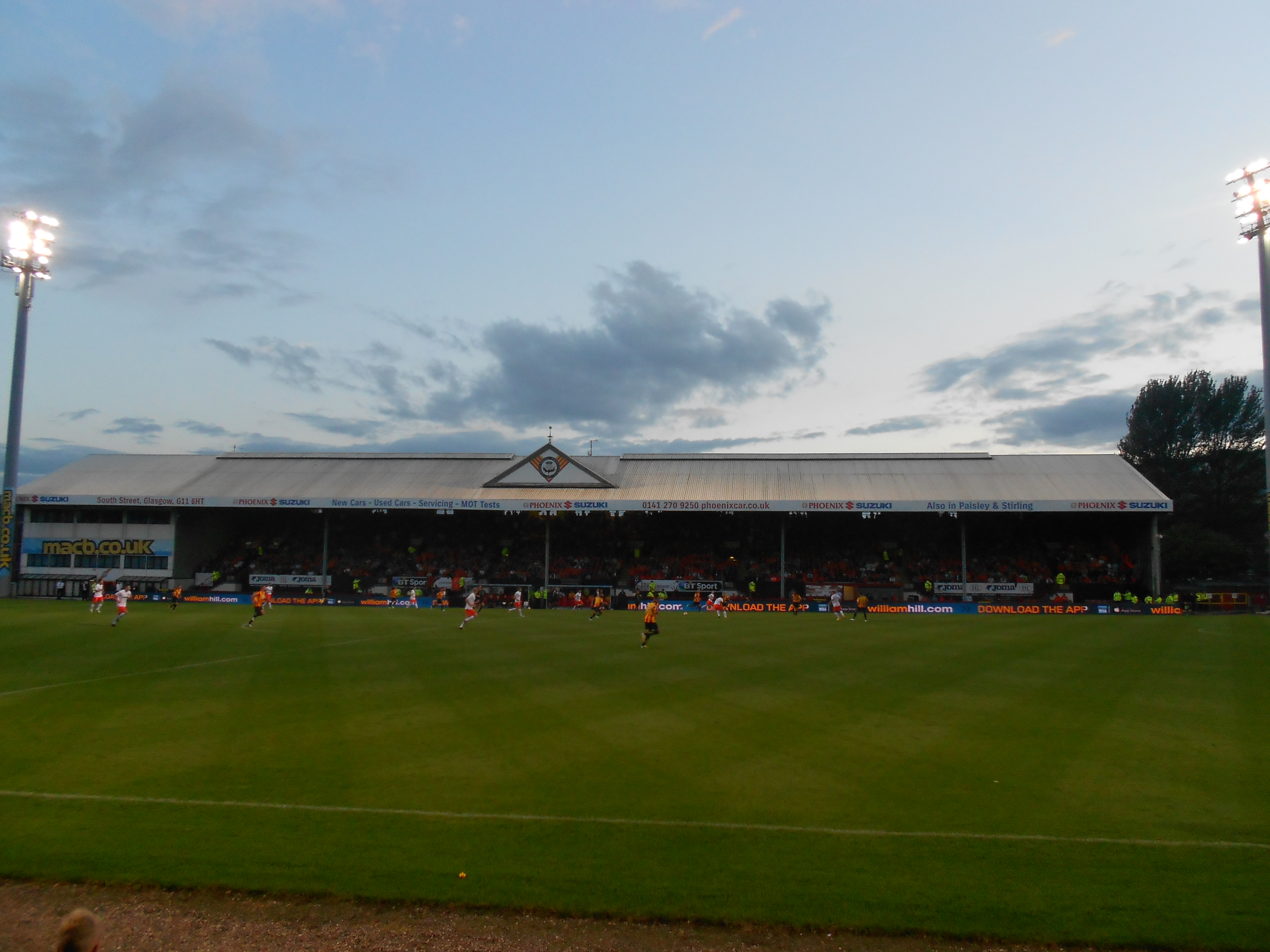
Firhill Stadium during a Scottish Premiership football match (2013)

It was also a temporary home for Clyde and Hamilton Academical during the 1980s and 1990s, and for Queens Park matches in 2021–22 while the club awaited development of their new stadium at Lesser Hampden.

Between 2005 and 2012, Firhill was also the home of professional Rugby Union team Glasgow Warriors who then moved to Scotstoun Stadium. The West of Scotland Football League (formerly junior) team, Maryhill F.C., and Glasgow's oldest athletic club Maryhill Harriers are also located in the area.

== Architecture, canalside and modernisation ==
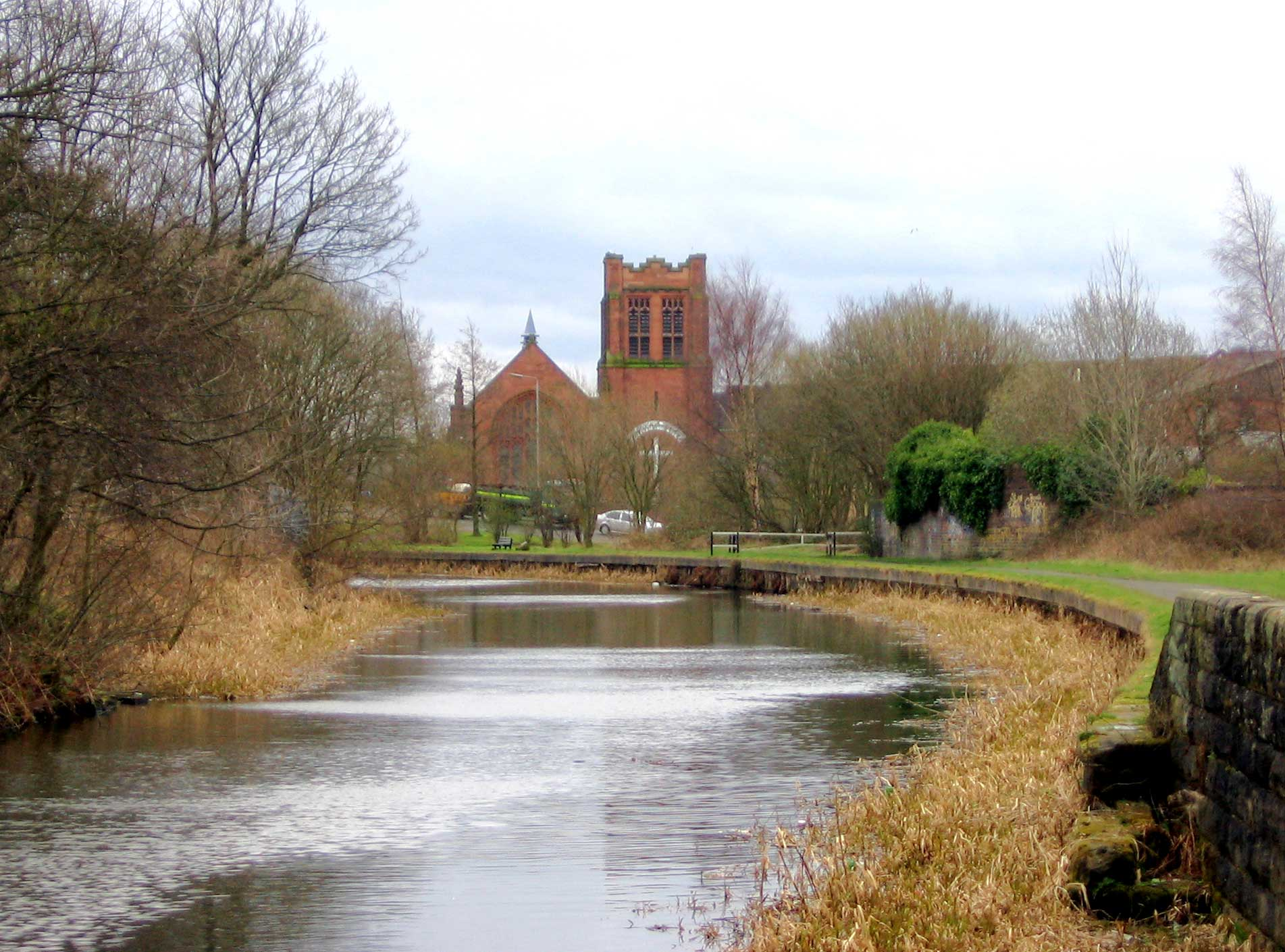
A branch of the Forth and Clyde Canal runs south from Gilshochill in Maryhill through Ruchill to Port Dundas: Ruchill Church stands beside the canal.

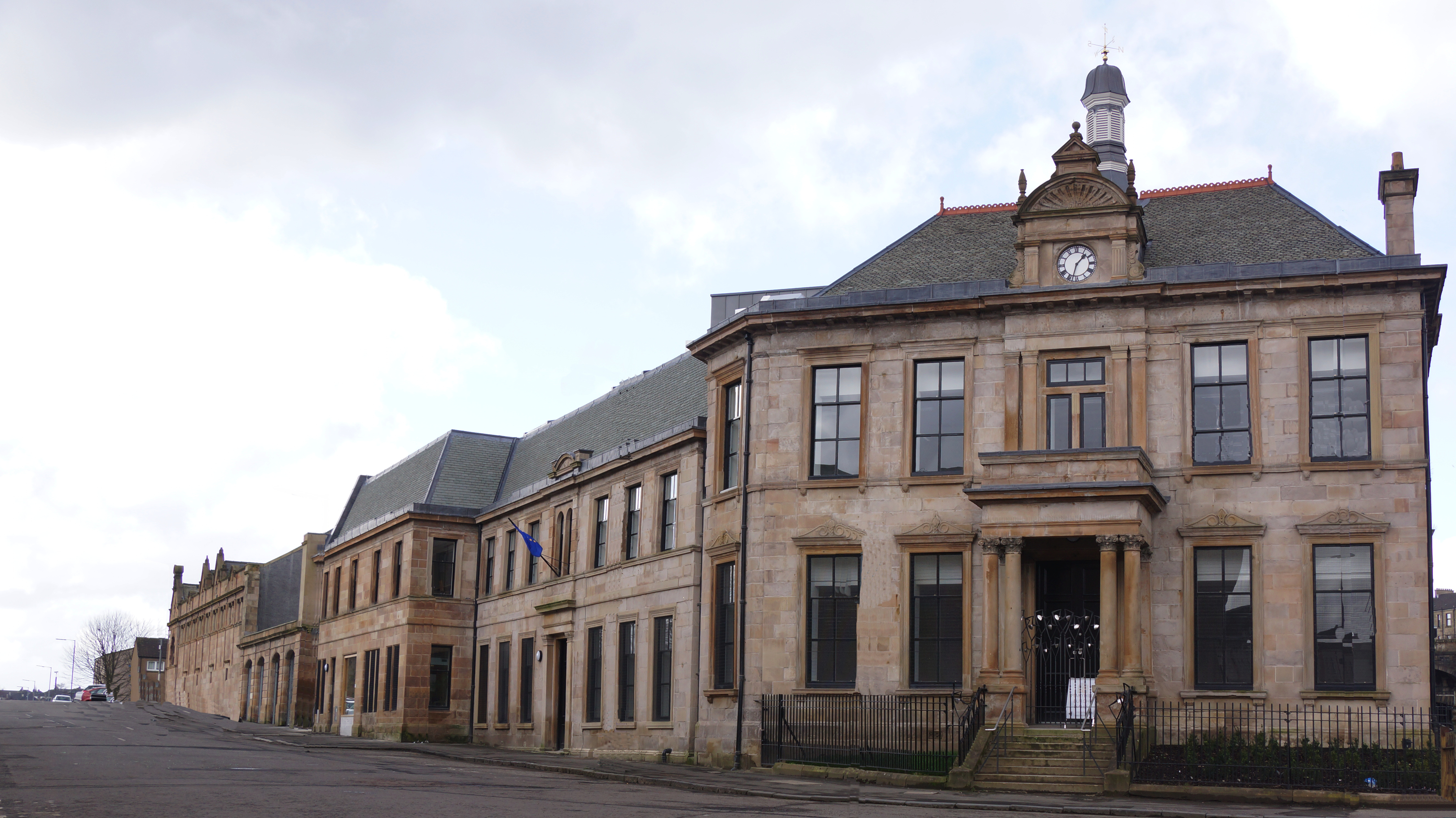
Maryhill Burgh Halls

Ruchill Church Hall was designed by Charles Rennie Mackintosh.

The Forth and Clyde Canal flows through Maryhill, at one stage forming a vital part of the local economy. It was for many years polluted and largely unused after the decline of heavy industry, but recent efforts to regenerate and re-open the canal to navigation have seen it rejuvenated. A new footbridge providing better connections to the Ruchill and Gilshochill neighbourhoods, was installed across the canal at Stockingfield Junction in 2022.

Twenty unique stained glass windows were produced by Stephen Adam in 1878 for the Maryhill Burgh Halls, depicting the many varied industries and occupations of Maryhill's inhabitants. The Burgh Halls, part of a complex of listed buildings including the former Baths & Wash-houses, the former Fire Station, and former Police Station, were restored in a £9.2M regeneration project, and a number of the original stained glass windows have been on display since late 2011.

The Maryhill Lochs were the venue for the 2017 Red Bull Neptune Race on 18 March that year.

== Subdivisions ==
=== Botany ===
Botany (55.8909°N 4.2929°W) is an area in Maryhill. One explanation for the name of the area that it was viewed as a rougher part of the then village of Maryhill, with many rough-and-tumble lodging houses and public houses, and many of its residents were expected to be deported to Botany Bay in Australia, then acting as a penal colony. However, a more prosaic explanation is that there was a school in the area known as the Botany School, now long closed, but the name survived.

This reputation for being a rough area did not lessen over the years, with Botany (commonly referred to as 'The Butney' by local people) having many social problems of deprivation, unemployment and drug abuse. The local gang was known as "The Butny".

The area has been completely cleared by the city council and is under construction for new modern apartment flats along with many other areas of Maryhill.

From 2018 on, the area's name is preserved by a local bar at Maryhill Road 795 which has been named The Botany. In April 2024 the business has been sold to industry veteran Jack Quirk. After a refurbishment it reopened in May, now renamed to Café Ibiza.

=== Maryhill Park ===
Maryhill Park (55.9025°N 4.3016°W) is an area of Maryhill. Unlike much of the rest of Maryhill, the population is predominantly middle-class and the property type in the area consists mainly of Victorian semi-detached town houses. The Maryhill Locks, a steeply-descending series of pools on the Forth & Clyde Canal are nearby.

The present day Maryhill railway station was at one stage called Maryhill Park to distinguish it from the Maryhill railway station that then existed further down Maryhill Road (near the Wyndford area of Maryhill). Both stations were closed as part of the Beeching cuts of the 1960s, and when the former Maryhill Park station was reopened in the 1990s the "Park" part of the title was dropped as the other station was not reopened. The area is also served by numerous bus routes along Maryhill Road.

=== Queen's Cross ===
Queen's Cross is a neighbourhood in the area of Maryhill mostly made up of working class social housing, mainly owned by Queens Cross Housing Association, the local housing authority named for the area.

The cross is the junction where Maryhill Road and Garscube Road meet extending south to the neighbouring areas of St George's Cross and Cowcaddens respectively. The area's Queen's Cross Church designed by Glasgow architect Charles Rennie Mackintosh also serves as the headquarters of the Charles Rennie Mackintosh Society.

== Maryhill in the media ==
Maryhill has been the location for a number of television programmes and films, namely:

- A short-lived 1960s TV soap High Living created by (then) Cowcaddens-based Scottish Television was set in a tower block in the Wyndford area of Maryhill, however as a totally studio-based drama, it relied on pictures of the flats as part of the opening and closing title sequences.
- Taggart, an internationally famous Glaswegian detective television programme, which is translated into many languages including German and Japanese is set and filmed in Maryhill.
- Trainspotting, a cafe in Maryhill was used as a set in Trainspotting, Jaconelli's at the Queens Cross area. Also, Crosslands on Queen Margaret Drive was the pub where Begbie started a fight by throwing a glass over his head into a crowded bar.
- The hit BBC television comedy series Chewin' the Fat was filmed in the area, a precedent followed by its successor the sitcom Still Game.

== Notable people ==
- Jamesina Anderson, politician
- Bertie Auld, footballer
- Maggie Bell, blues-rock singer
- Sean Biggerstaff, actor
- Robert Carlyle, actor
- Donovan, singer-songwriter
- Jim Duffy, footballer
- John Maxwell Geddes (1941–2017), composer
- Archibald Lyle, footballer
- Duncan Macrae, actor
- Ian McAteer, Dalmuir-born former gangster
- David McCallum, actor and musician
- Charlie Nicholas, footballer
- Jerry Reynolds, footballer
- George Ritchie, footballer
- Robert Smith, Baron Smith of Kelvin, businessman
- Soom T, reggae singer and rapper

== See also ==
- Forth to Firth Canal Pathway
- Glasgow tower blocks
