= Jamesina Anderson =

Scottish politician (1885–1977)

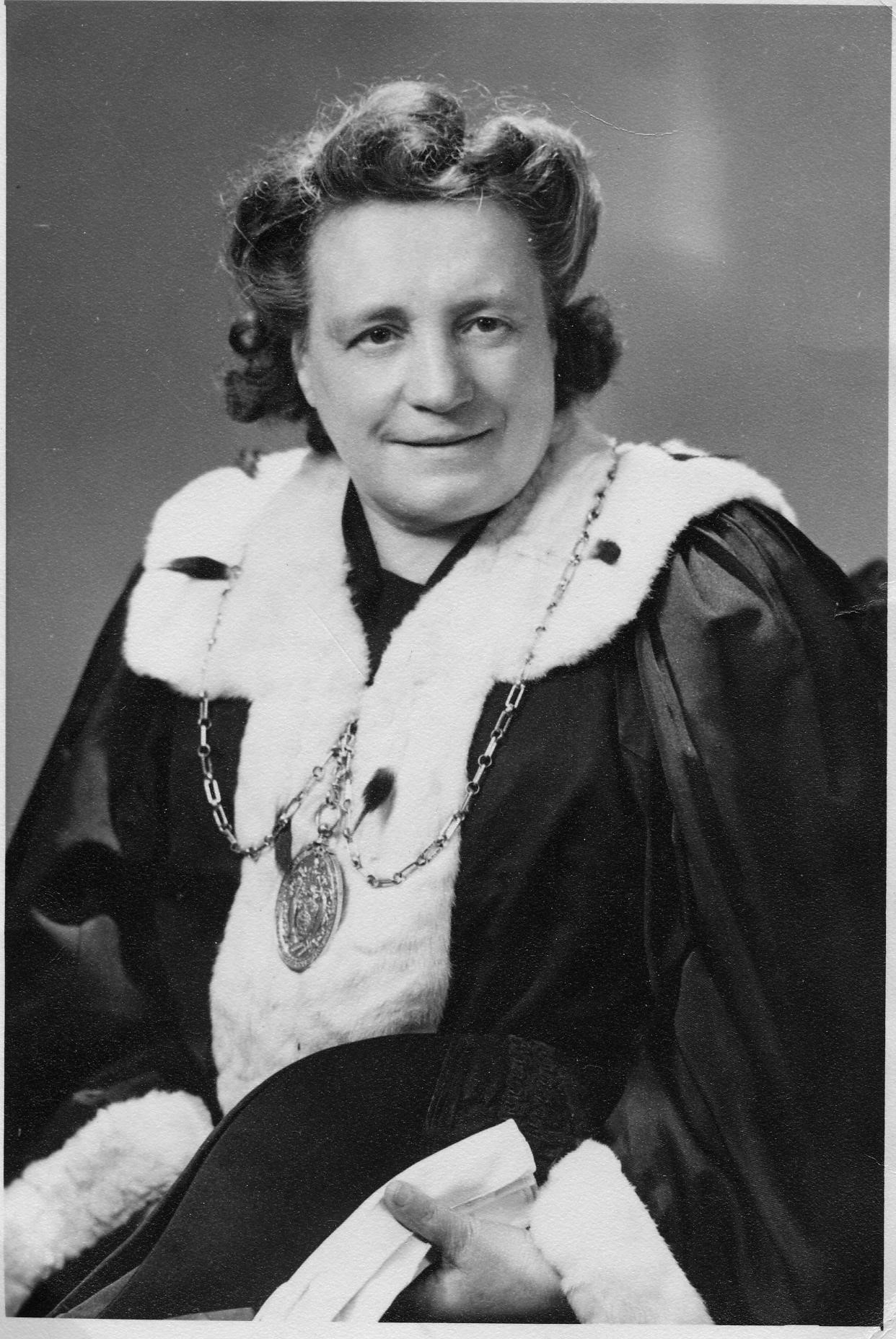
- Born: 1885; Glasgow, Scotland
- Died: 1977 (aged 91–92); Glasgow, Scotland
- Occupation: Politician
- Known for: Local Politics

Jamesina Anderson (née McKenna) (1885–1977) was a Scottish politician, socialist, and advocate of the rights of working-class people, especially the elderly and children.

== Early life and education ==
Jamesina McKenna was born in Glasgow, Scotland in December 1885. Her father, a cab driver, had died three months before her birth. Her mother remarried in 1888. Jamesina left school aged 13–14 and was a hand-loom weaver and milliner until 1906 when she married John Anderson, an iron-milling machinist and a foreman at Singer's sewing machine factory in Clydebank. They had eight children, of whom six survived her. They lived in Maryhill, Glasgow.

== Welfare and Workers' Rights ==
She was a founding member of the Maryhill Ward Committee in 1920 and was elected several times as chair, until it was disbanded following local government reconstruction in 1977. She had a particular interest in the welfare of the elderly, organising fund-raising and holiday events for older people during her working life, and after she retired from the council.

== Political career ==
She was elected to Glasgow Town Council as a Labour Party Councillor for Maryhill in 1945, and represented Maryhill Ward 18 from 1945 to 1962. She was elected as magistrate in 1947, was a Baillie from 1947 to 1951, and served as a Police Court Judge for the burgh of Maryhill from 1951. On the council, she served on a variety of standing committees and was convenor of the Children's Committee. She was also on the sub-committee for Boarding-Out, in which role she travelled to check on children who had been boarded-out to be looked after
