= Queen's Cross Church, Glasgow =

Queen's Cross Church
- The Mackintosh Church
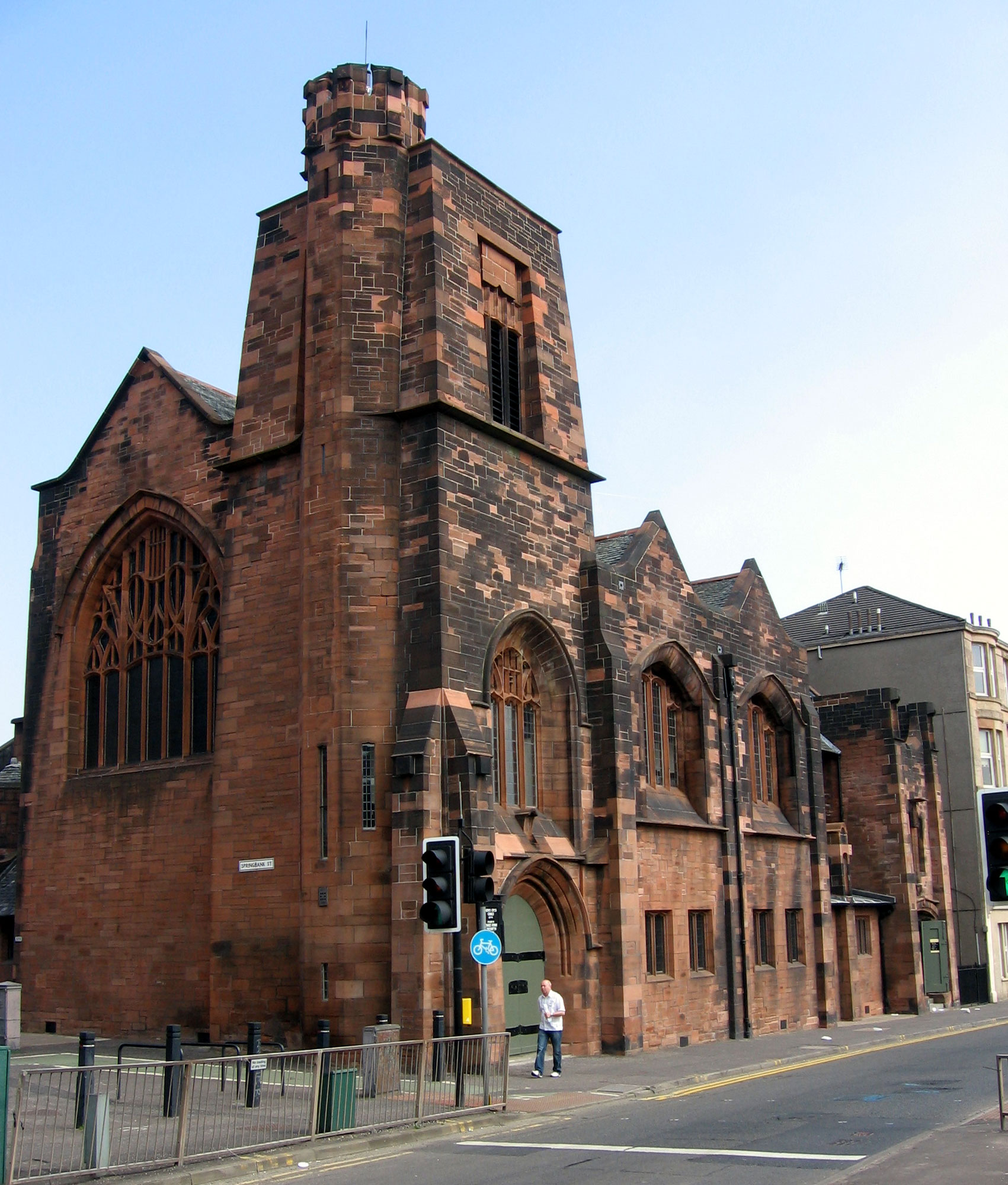
- The church tower seen from the road junction
- Queen's Cross Church
- 55°52′49″N 4°16′18″W
- Location: Glasgow
- Country: Scotland
- Denomination: Secularised
- Previous denomination: Church of Scotland
- Website: Website

Architecture
- Functional status: Museum & Venue hall
- Architect: Charles Rennie Mackintosh
- Architectural type: Church
- Style: Art Nouveau
- Groundbreaking: 23 June 1898
- Completed: 10 September 1899

Specifications
- Materials: Red Sandstone Ashlar

Listed Building – Category A
- Designated: 6 July 1966
- Reference no.: LB33764

Queen's Cross Church is a former Church of Scotland parish church in Glasgow, Scotland. It is the only church designed by Charles Rennie Mackintosh to have been built; hence, it is also known as The Mackintosh Church.

== History ==
In 1896, the Free Church of St Matthew, Glasgow, commissioned a new church and hall from the experienced Glasgow architectural practice of Honeyman and Keppie, to be located within the developing area of Springbank, near Maryhill. John Honeyman allocated the job to his young, talented, trainee architect, Charles Rennie Mackintosh. The site was an awkward one, being on a corner plot and butted by tenements and a large warehouse. In keeping with their beliefs, the Free Church required simplicity in design. A memorial stone was laid on 23 June 1898 and the church held its first service on 10 September 1899.

Although he designed an Anglican Cathedral for Liverpool, as part of a competition, it was never built, so Queen's Cross was the only Mackintosh church to be completed. Building started shortly after Mackintosh finished his competition design for the Glasgow School of Art. It is built at Queen's Cross, at the junction of Garscube Road and Maryhill Road in Glasgow's Maryhill area.

== Mackintosh Design ==
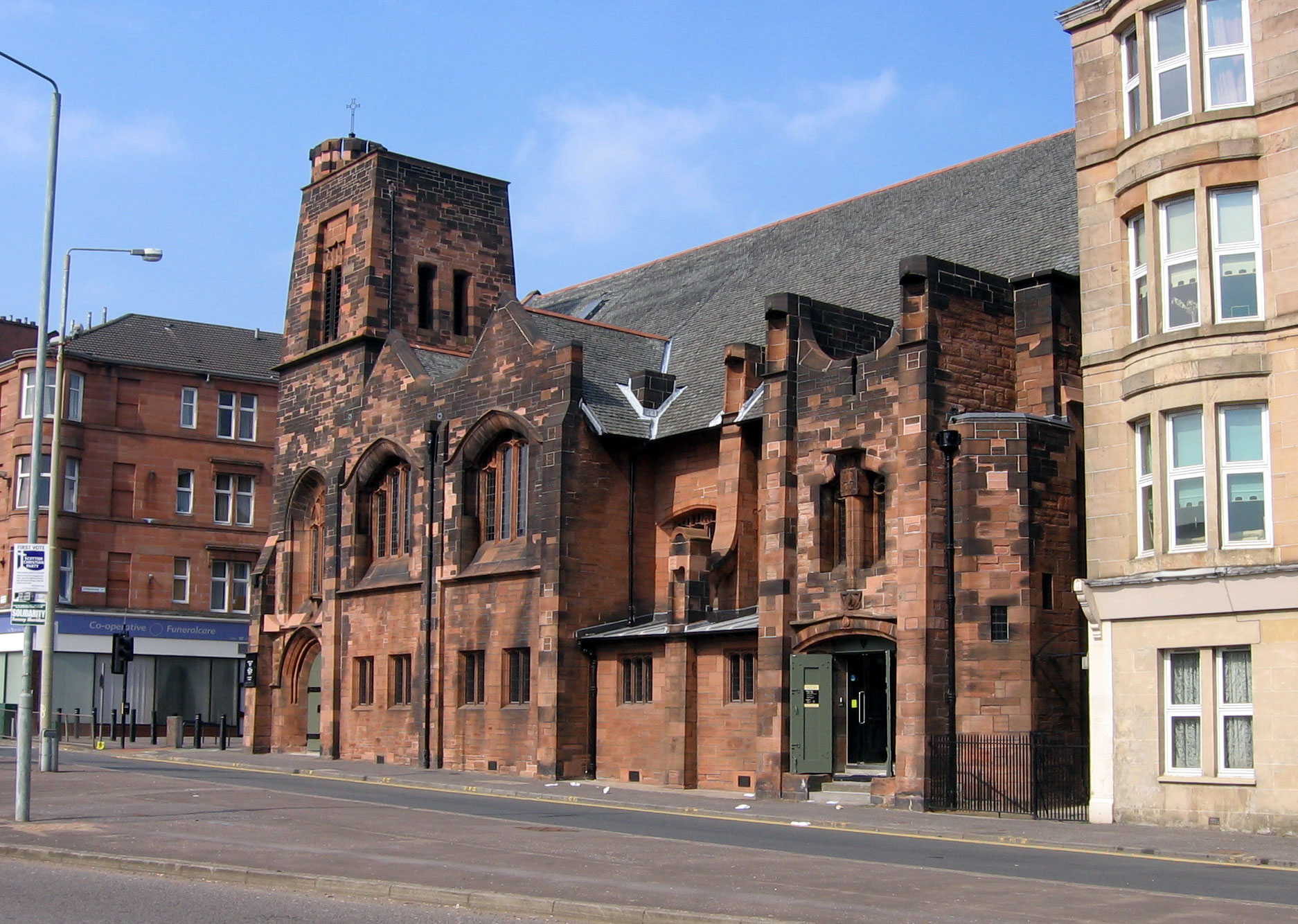
View from south-east.

=== Exterior ===
Unlike many churches in Glasgow, Mackintosh's church doesn't have a huge towering spire, and is rather squat and more like a Norman Castle, called 'Modern gothic' by other architects. The main south-west tower was modelled on one at Merriot in Somerset which Mackintosh visited in 1895.

=== Interior ===
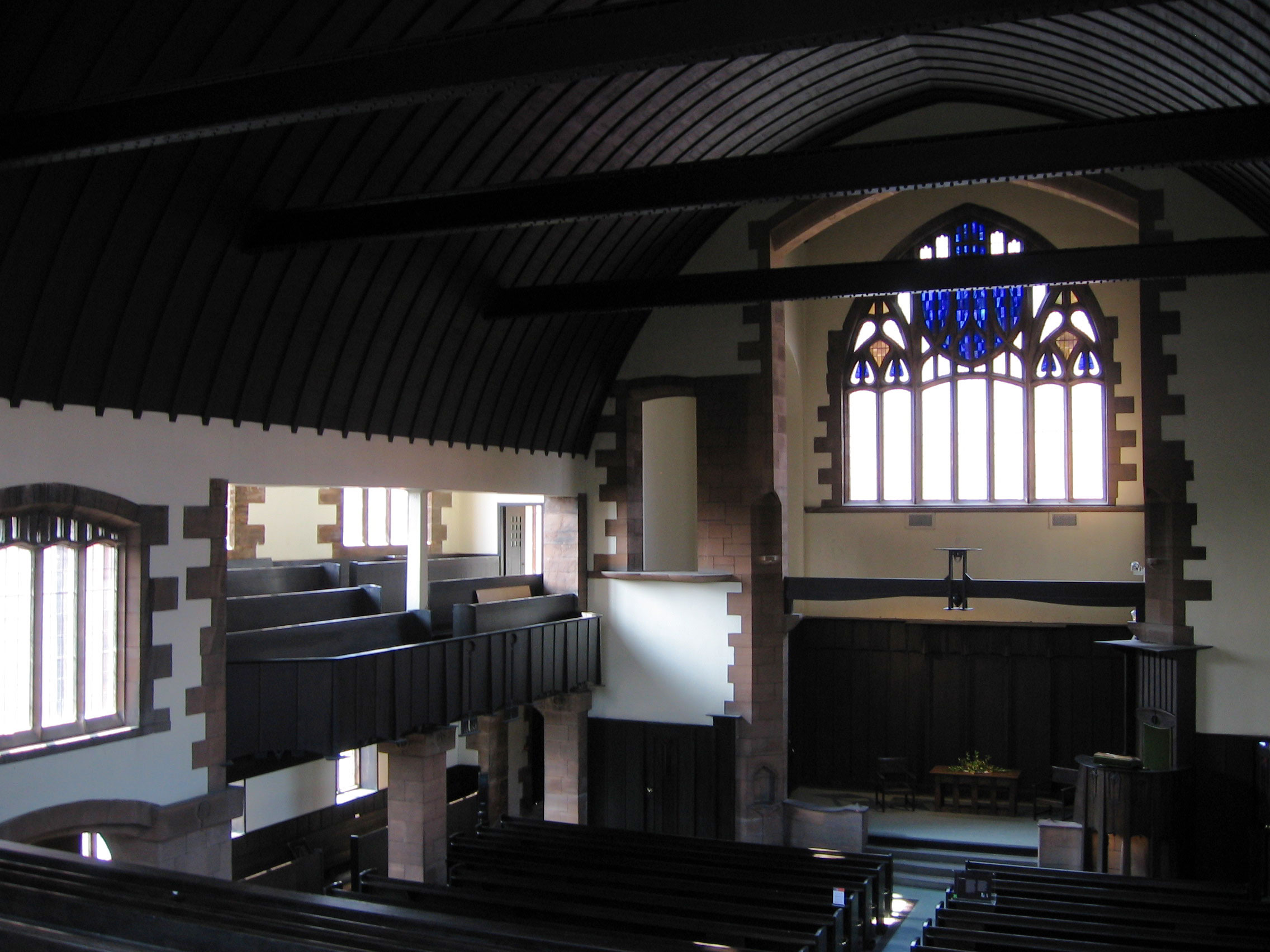
The west window and balcony over the south aisle, seen from the main balcony.

Although the stained glass windows are not 'spectacular' compared to other churches and cathedrals, they are distinctly Mackintosh in design. The style is still used on many Mackintosh-style windows and stained glass souvenirs available today.

The roof is made up by a striking timber-lined barrel-vaulted roof, which spans the entire forty feet of the nave.

The pulpit is carved in Mackintosh designs, which repeat five times around the curved front. It has been suggested that it represents the wings of a bird protecting young shoots - sown on fertile ground.

The design contains gothic influences, such as the magnificent stained glass blue-heart window, and pre-Reformation style elements, such as the replica of the original rood beam, which is unique in Scotland. It is even possible to find Japanese influences in the double beams and pendants inside the church.

== Home of Charles Rennie Mackintosh Society ==
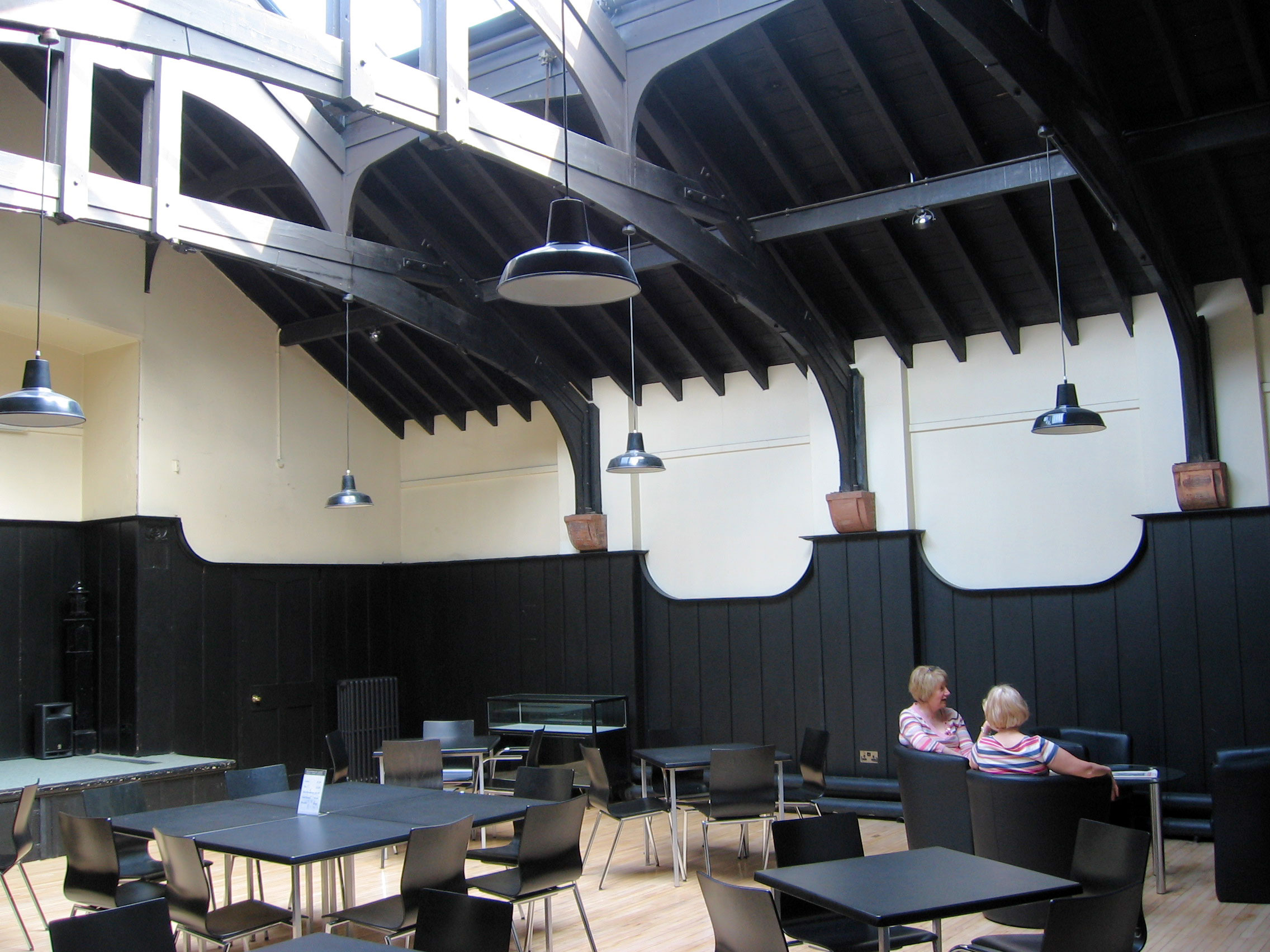
Church hall.

After the church was decommissioned in the 1970s, unlike many churches which were converted to theatres, apartments or demolished and because of the popularity of Mackintosh's work, the church became home of the Charles Rennie Mackintosh Society, which owns and operates the church as a tourist attraction.

The adjoining church hall provides tearoom facilities, and there is a display area under the balcony with many artifacts including replicas of the chairs he designed for the Willow Tearooms.

== See also ==
- Culture in Glasgow
- List of Church of Scotland parishes

== Gallery ==
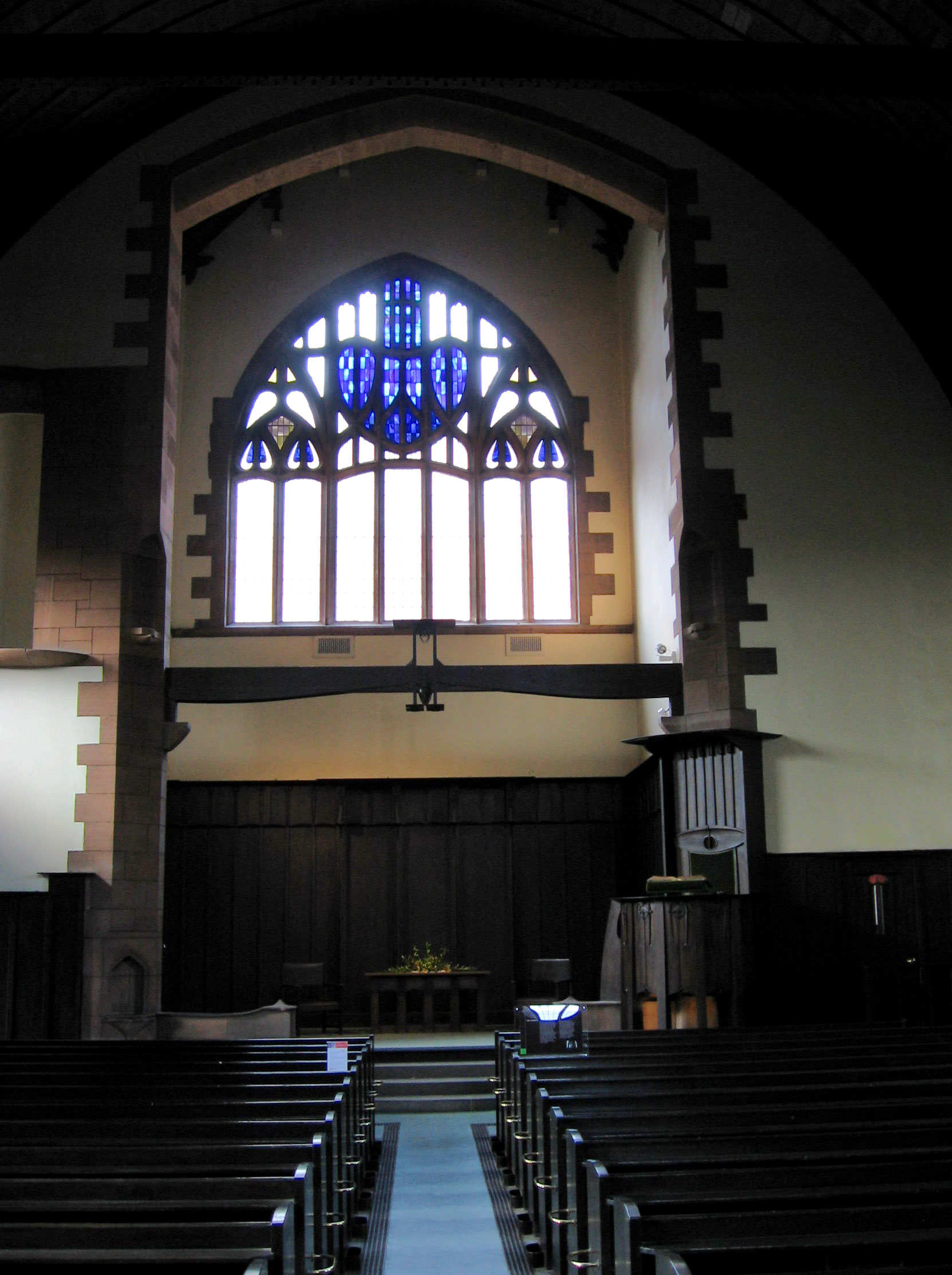
west window

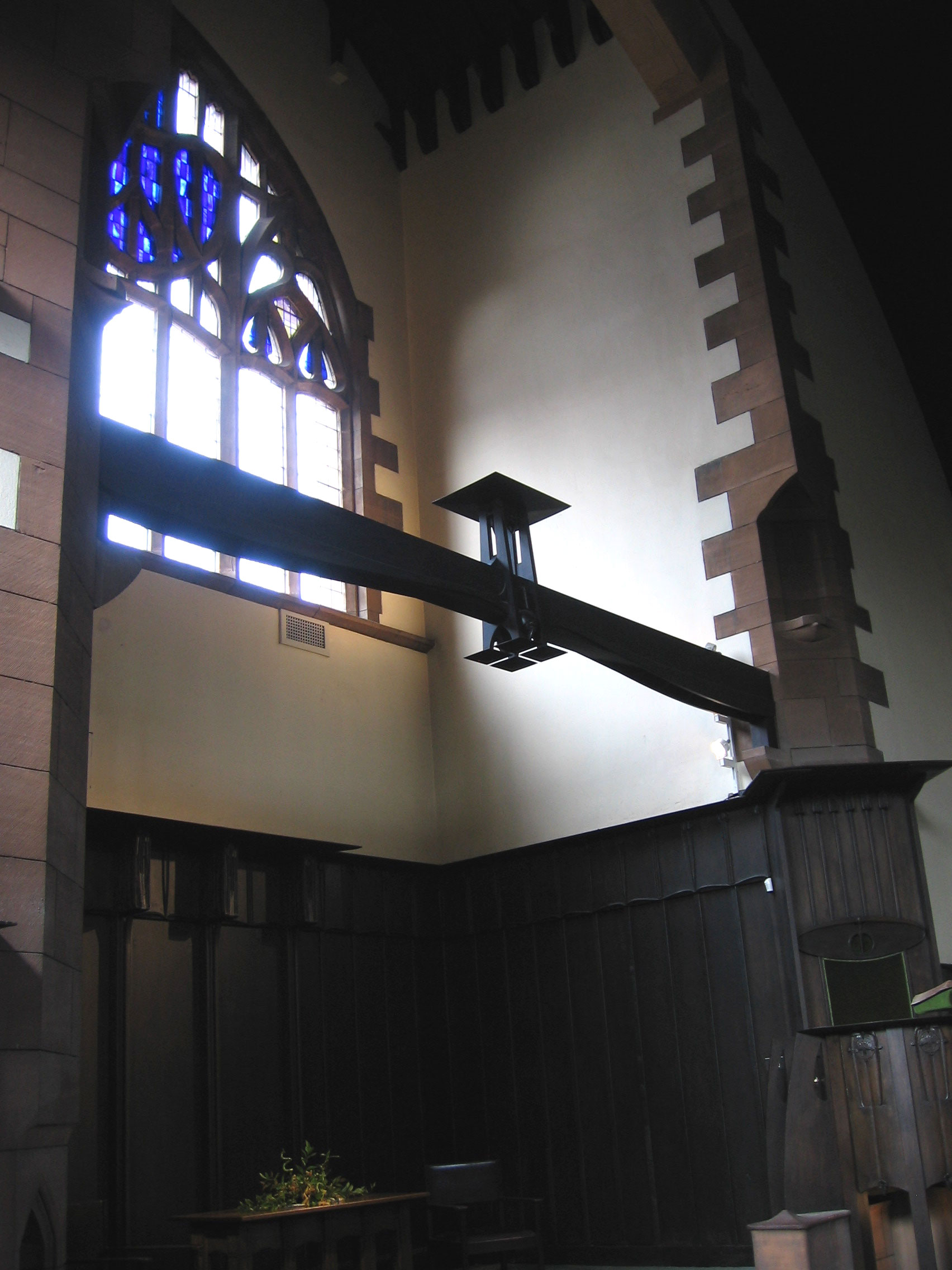
west window

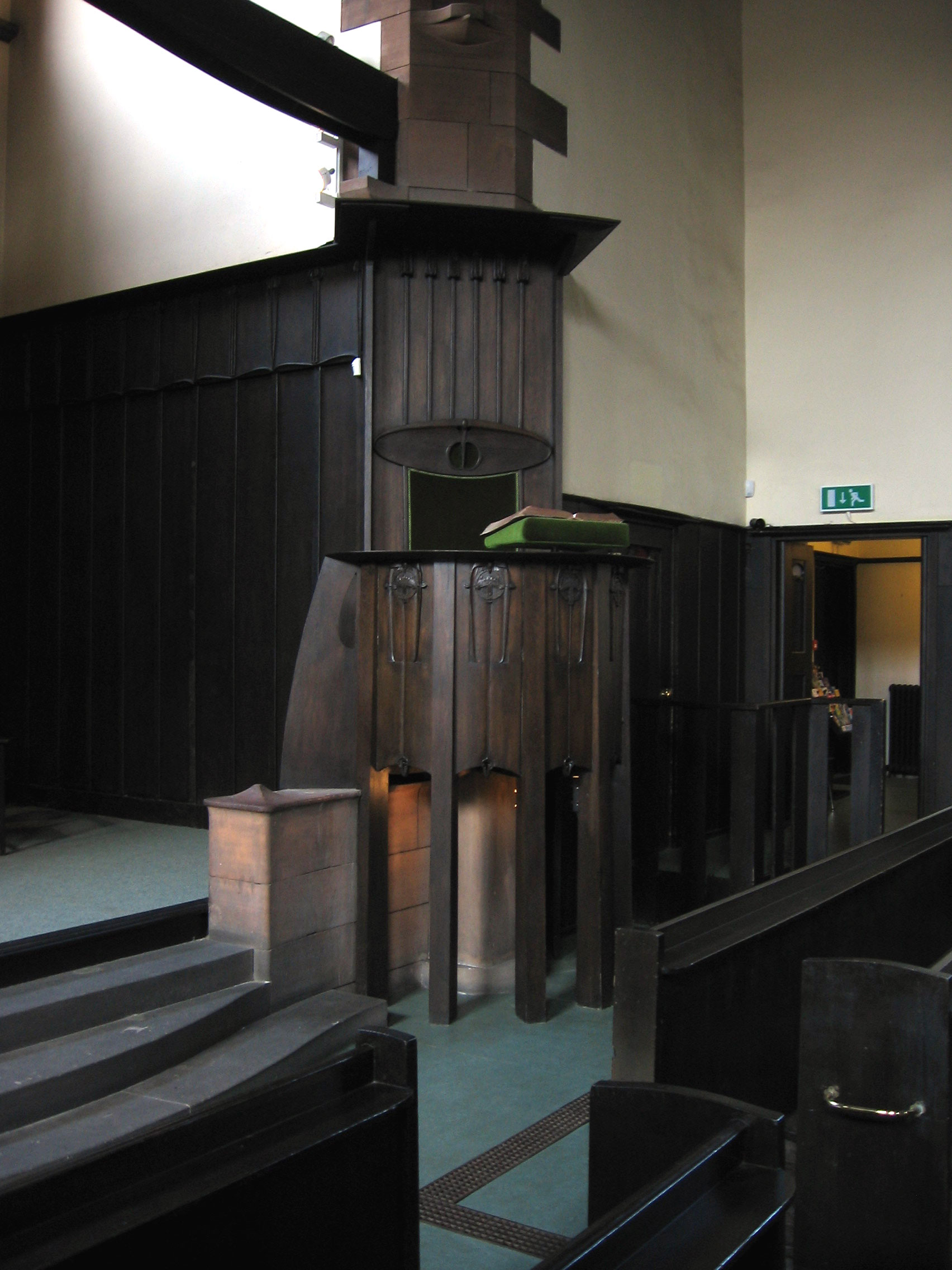
pulpit

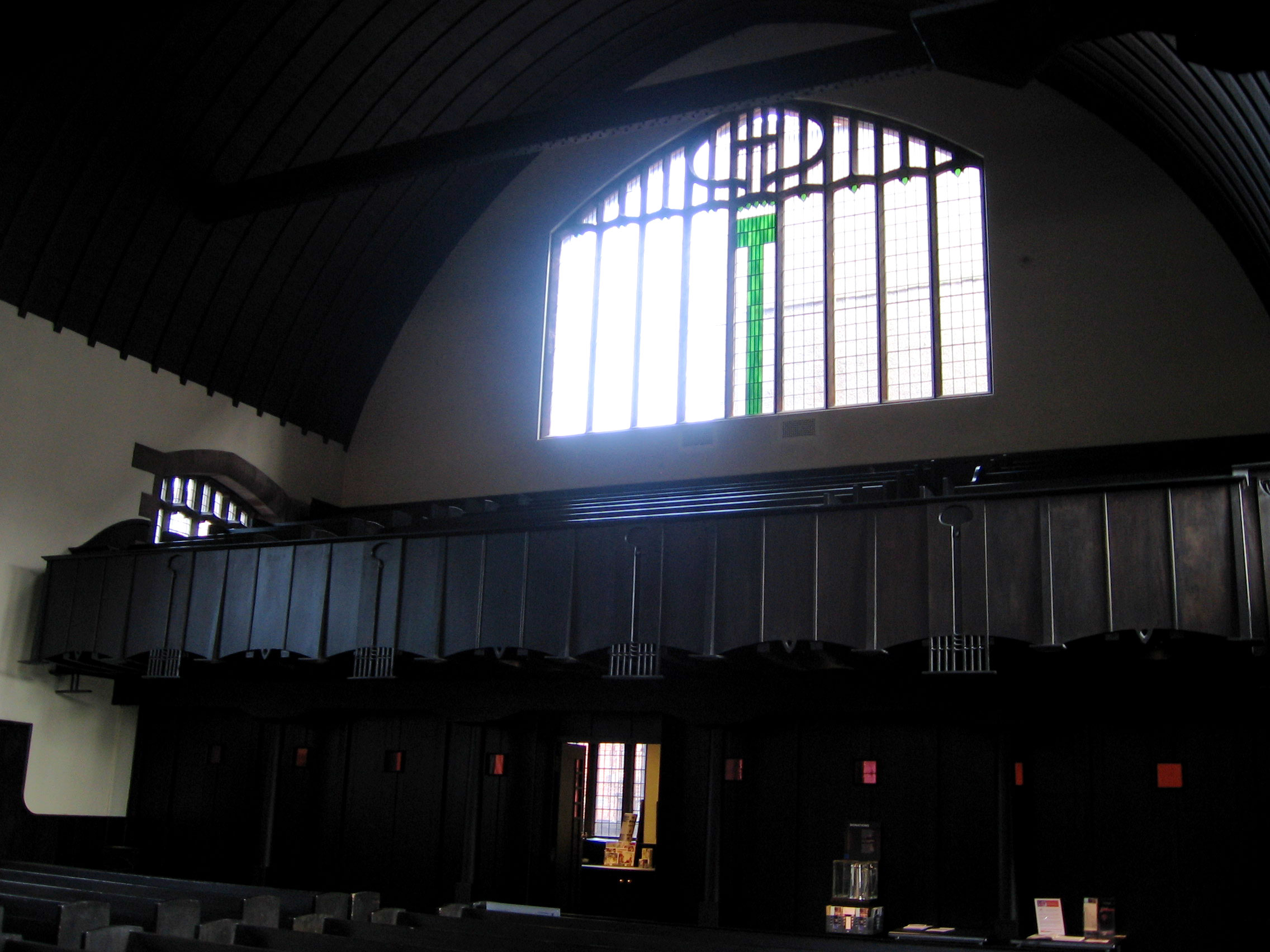
east window over main balcony

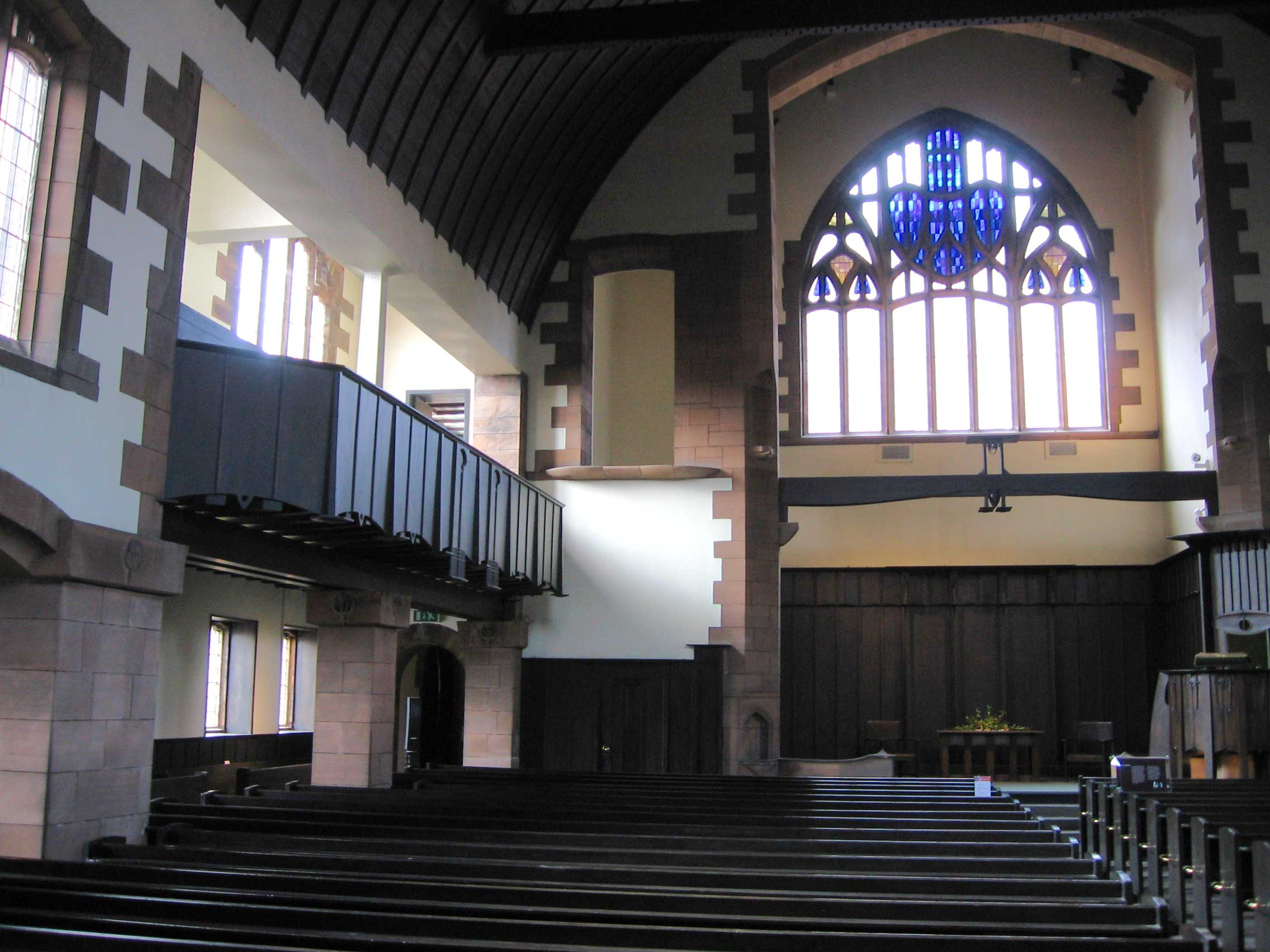
south aisle and west window

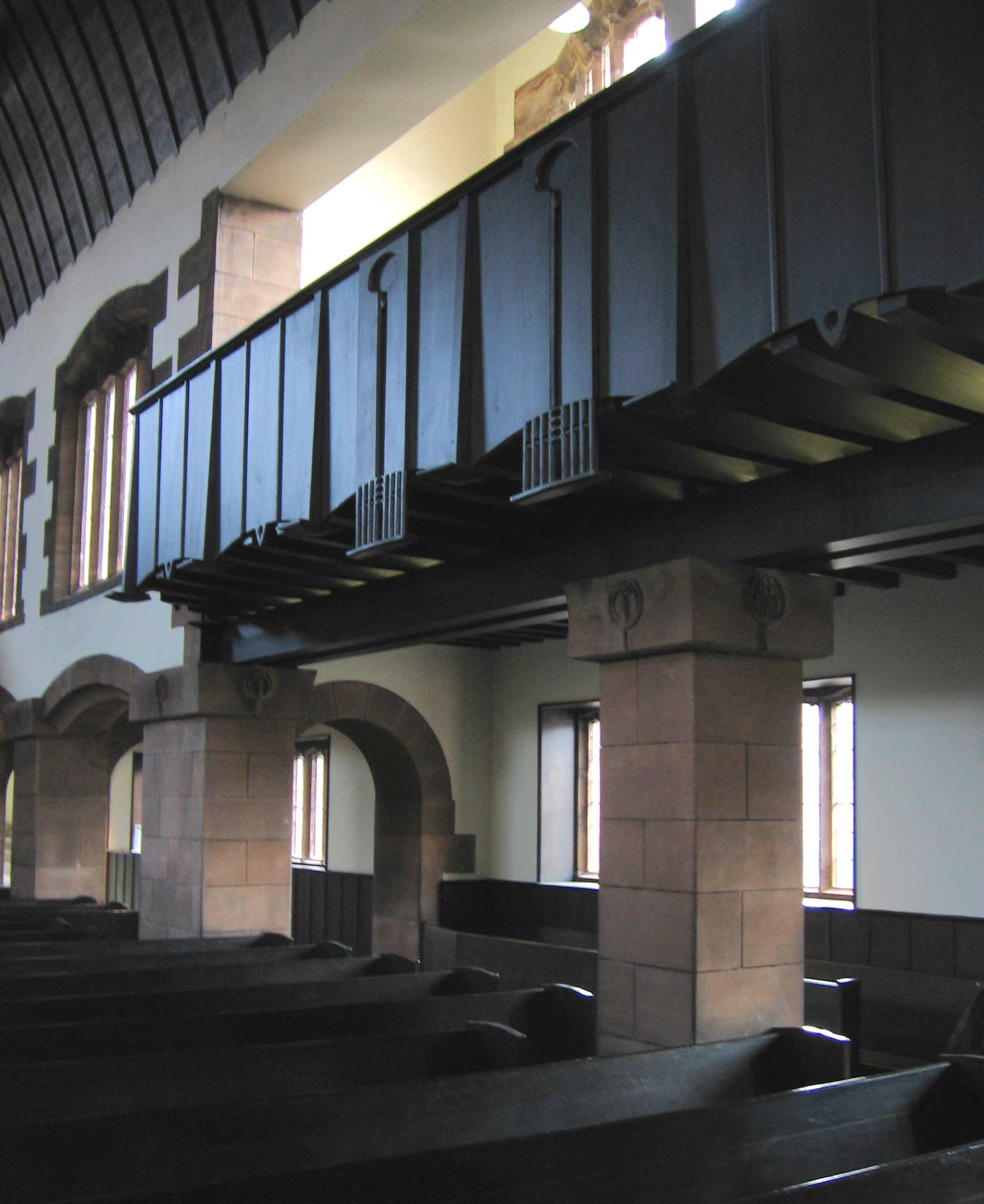
south aisle and balcony

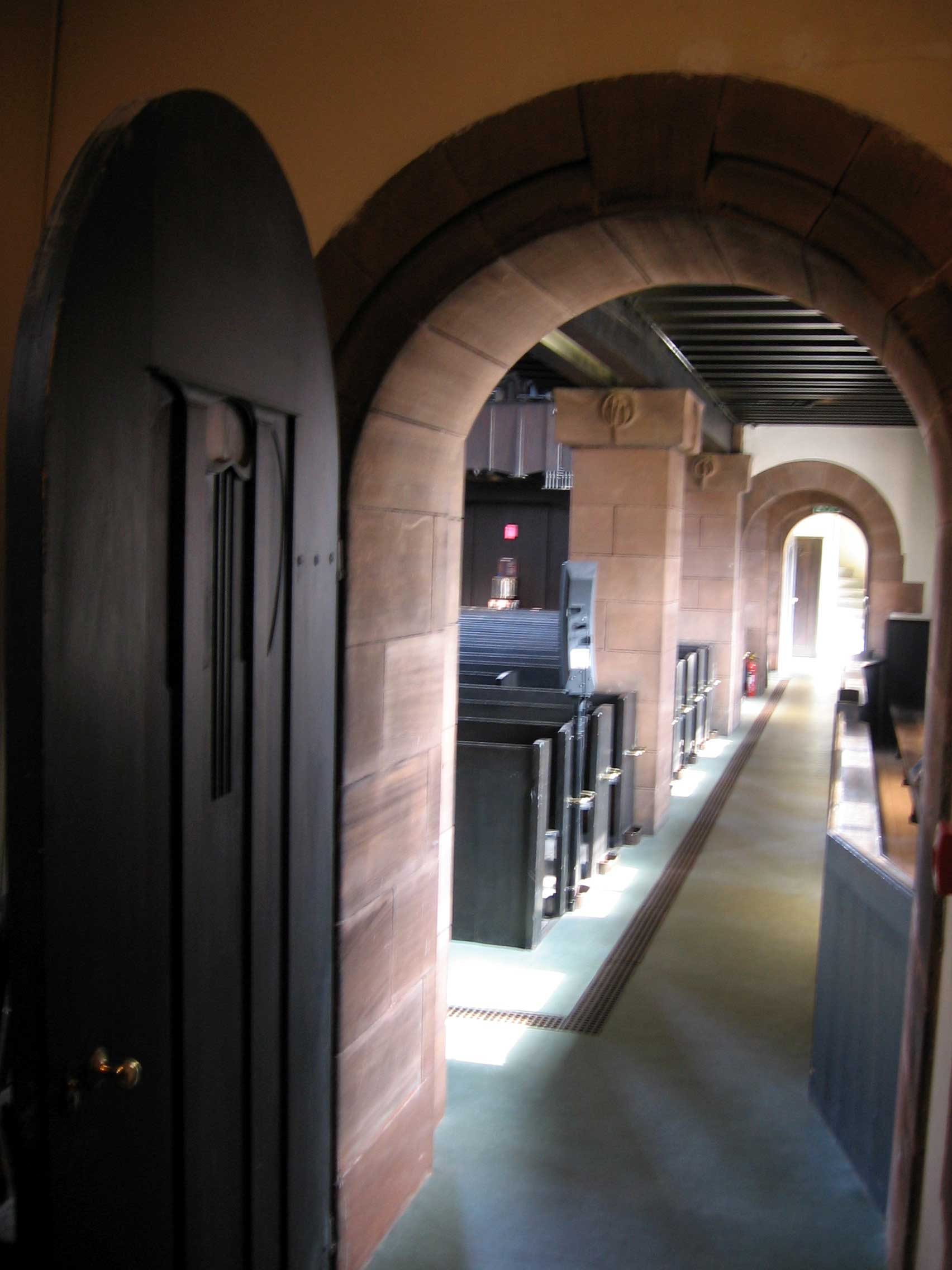
south aisle

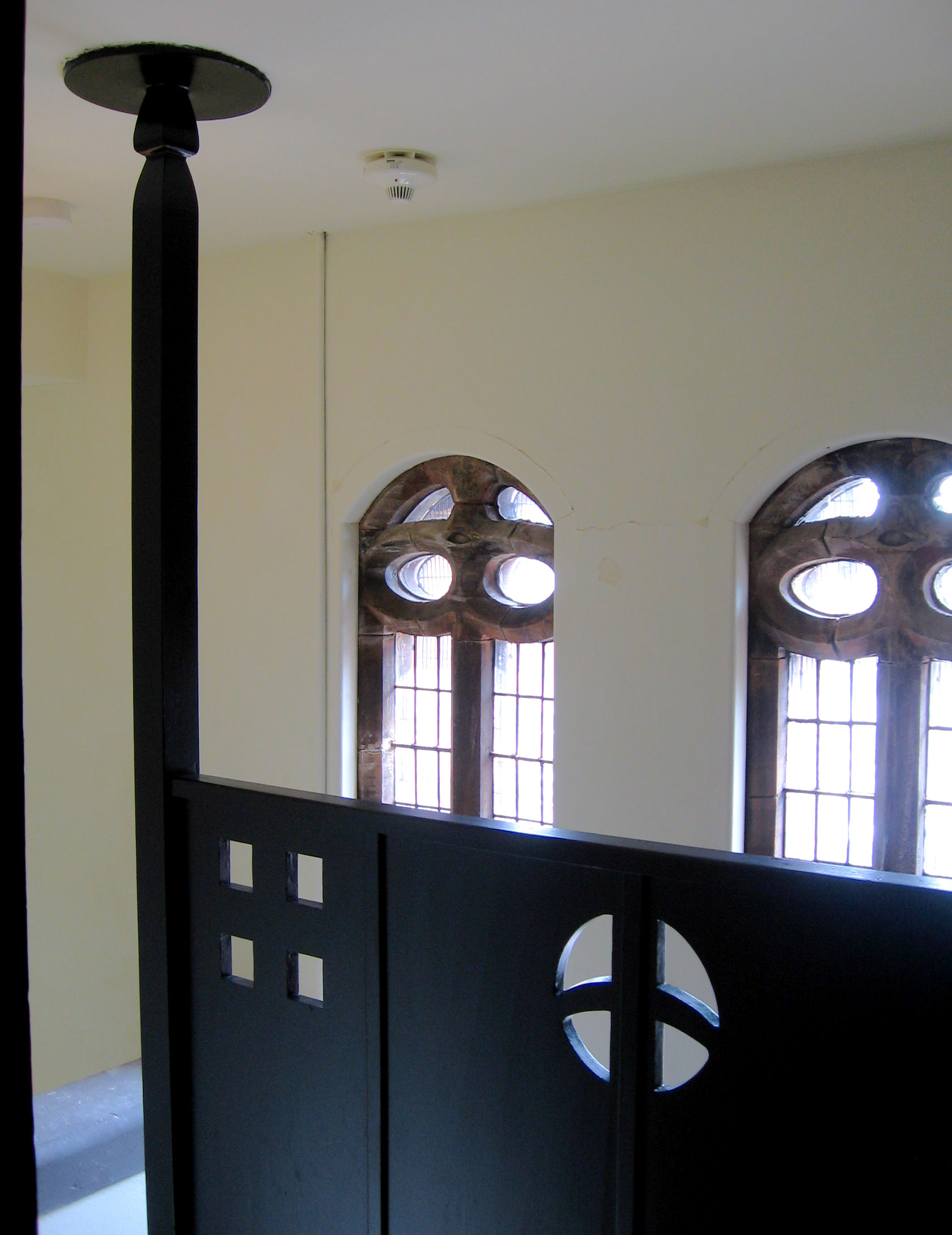
west stair

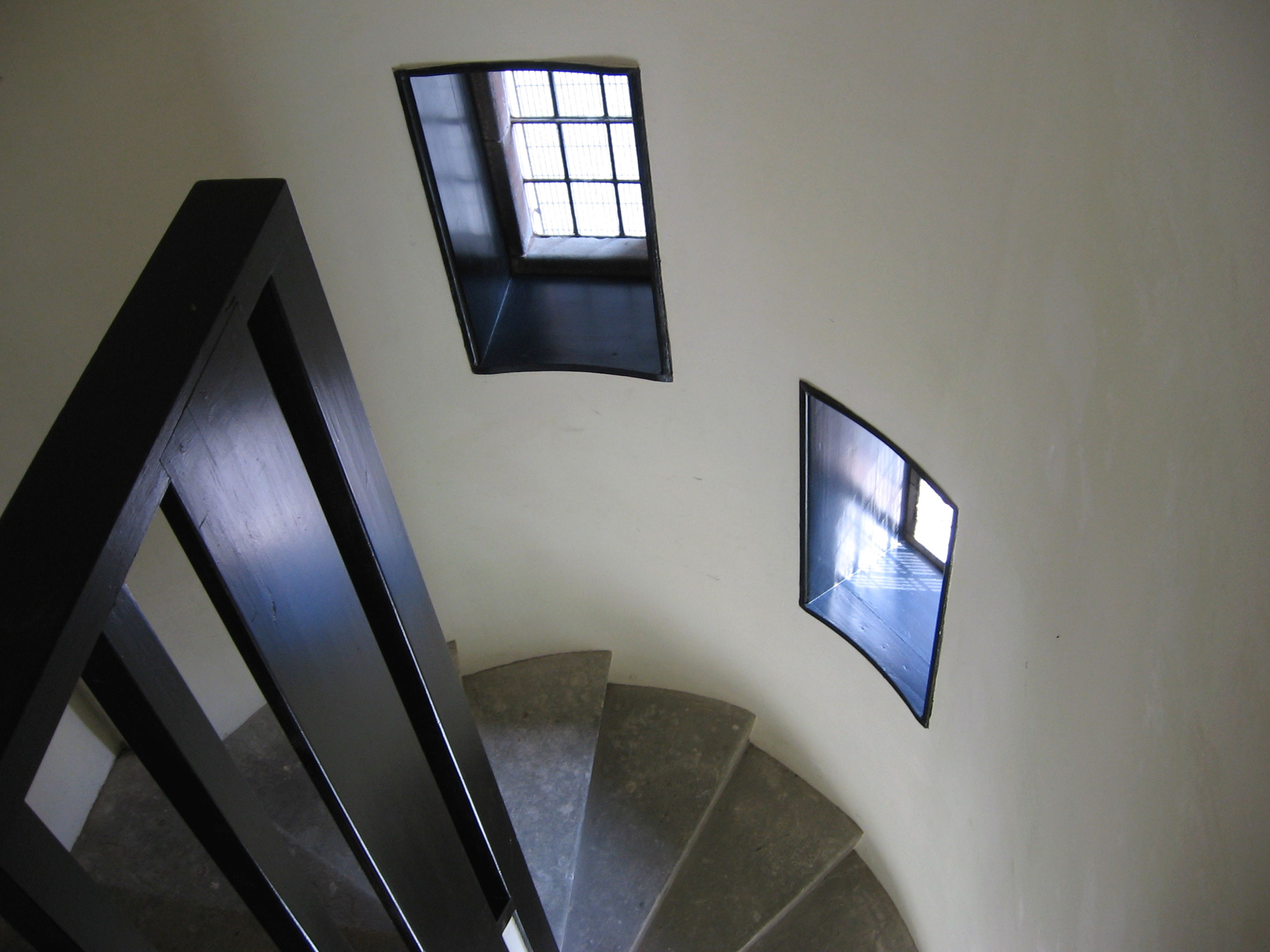
east stair

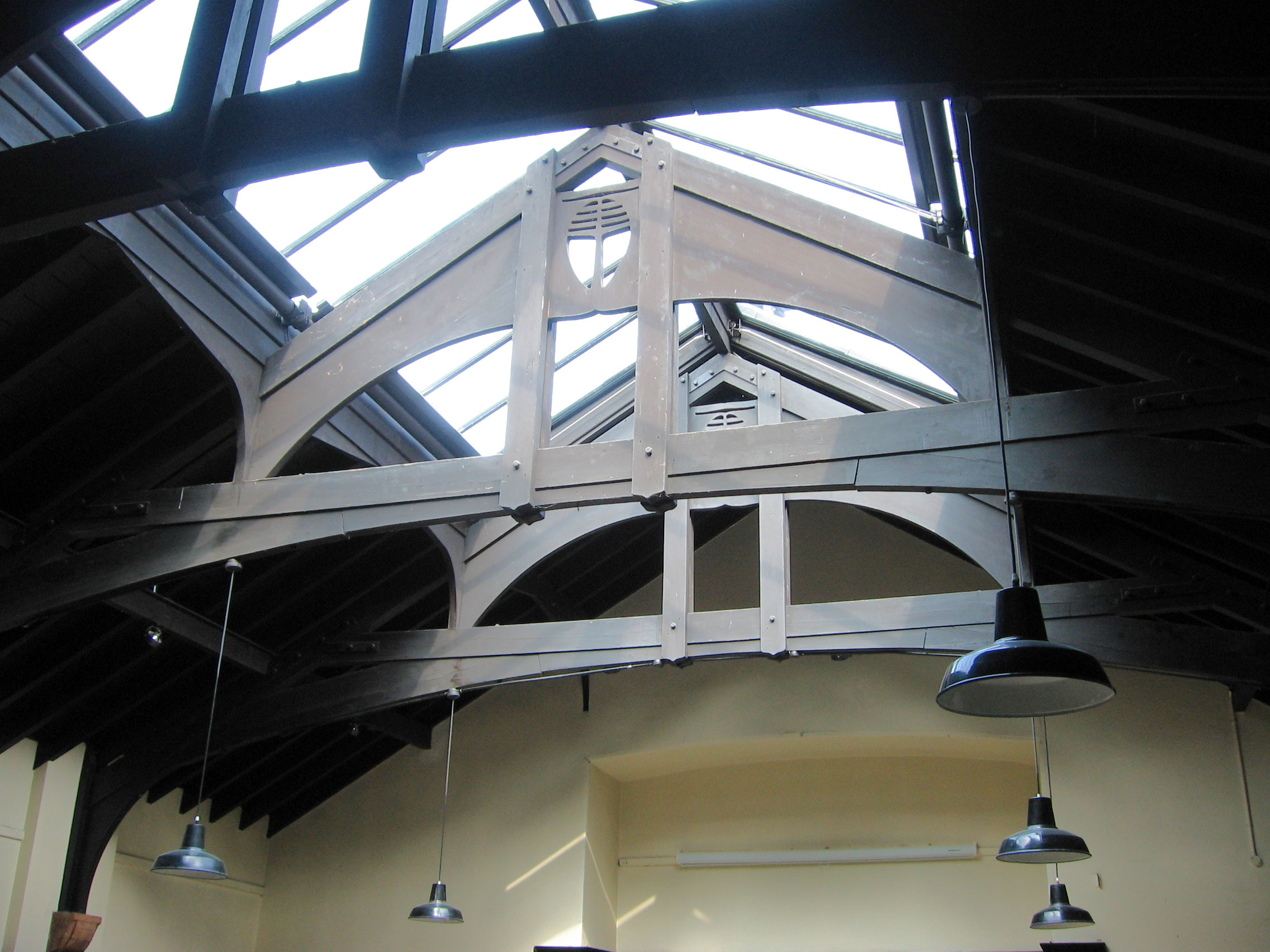
hall roof

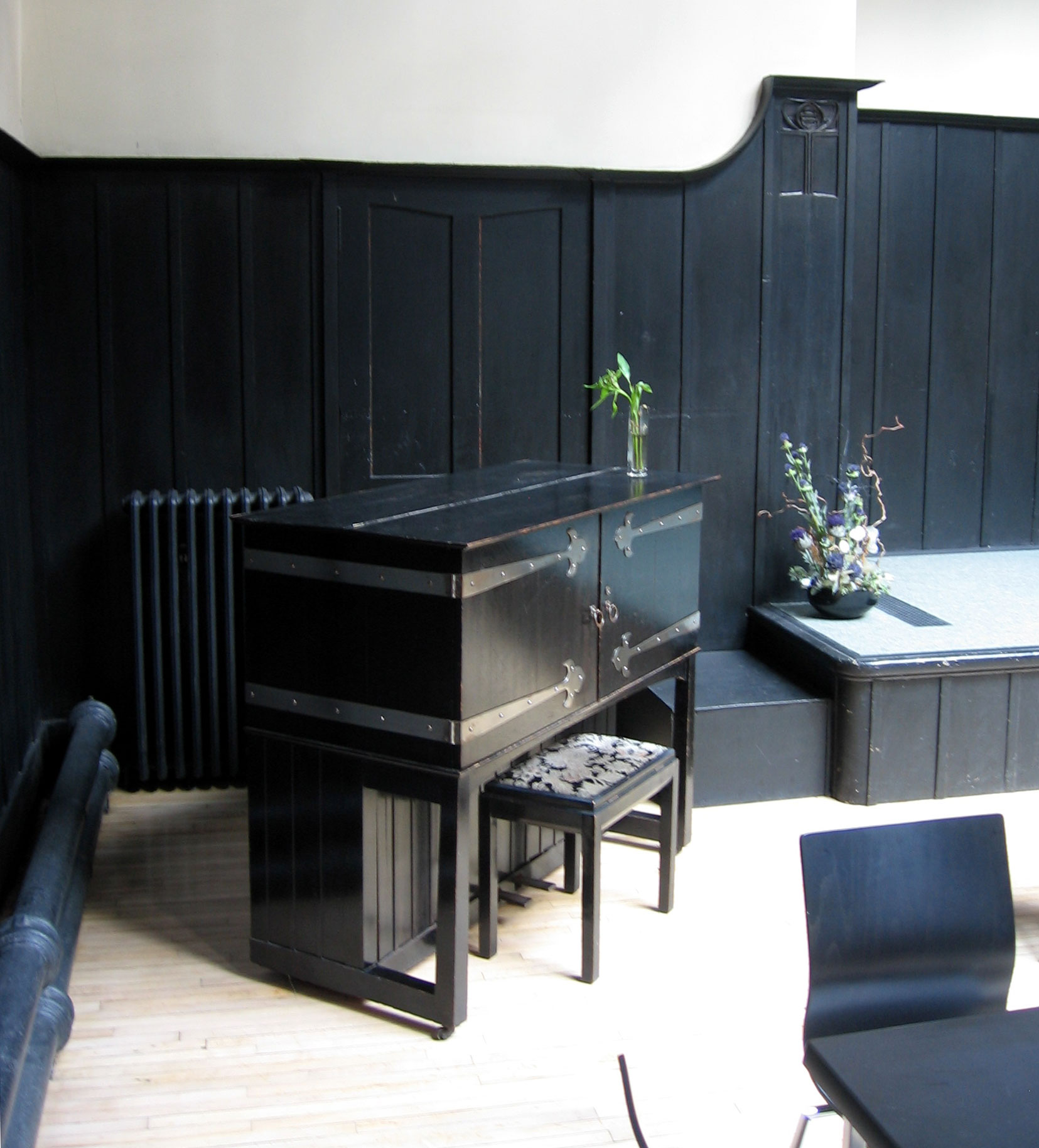
keyboard in hall

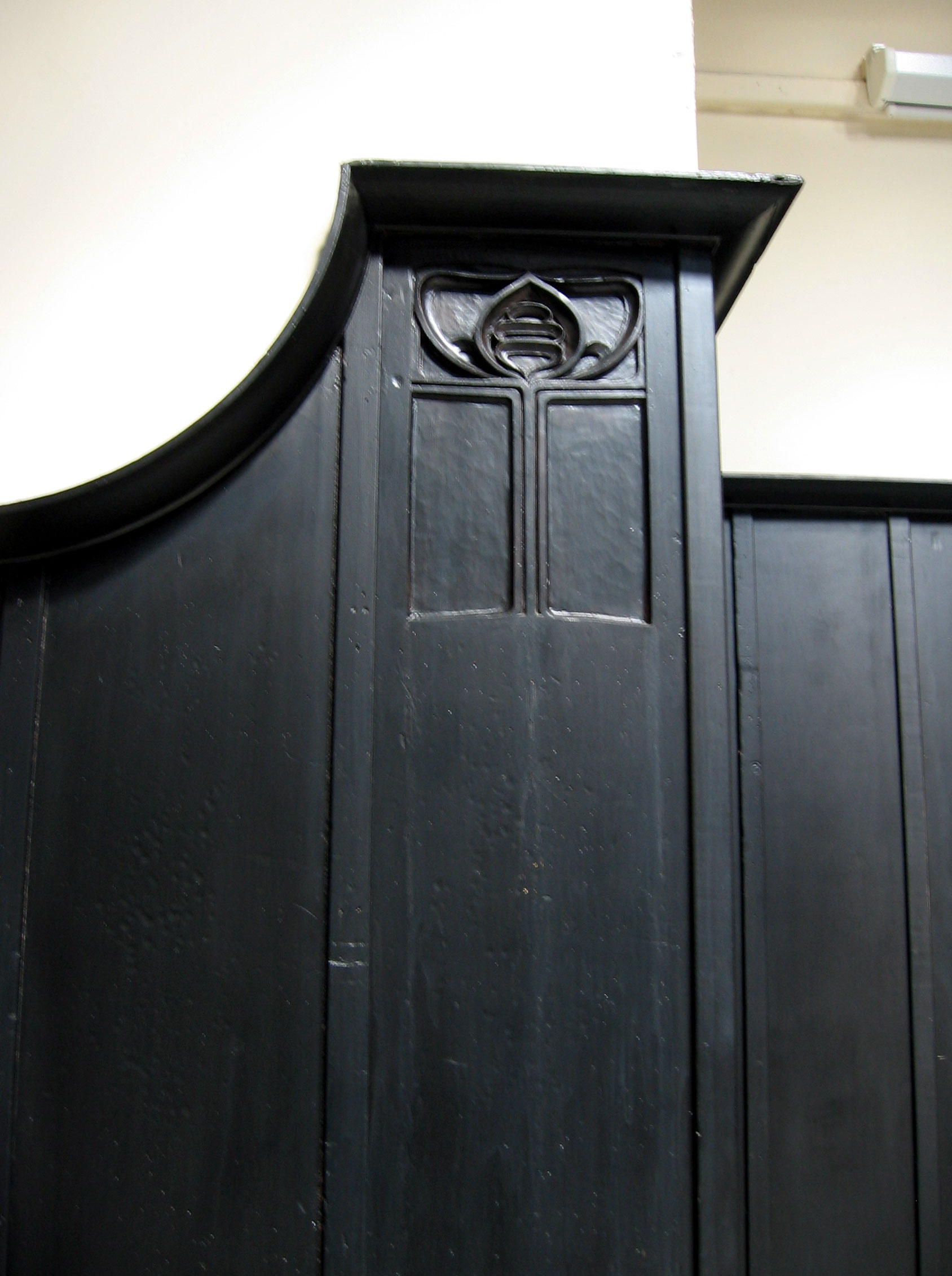
hall detail
