= North Kelvinside =

District of Glasgow, Scotland

Coordinates: 55.879541°N 4.277882°W

North Kelvinside: Scottish Gaelic: Cealbhainn a Tuath
- Location within Glasgow
- OS grid reference: NS576675
- Council area: Glasgow City Council
- Lieutenancy area: Glasgow
- Country: Scotland
- Sovereign state: United Kingdom
- Post town: GLASGOW
- Postcode district: G20
- Dialling code: 0141
- Police: Scotland
- Fire: Scottish
- Ambulance: Scottish
- UK Parliament: Glasgow North
- Scottish Parliament: Glasgow Kelvin

North Kelvinside (also referred to as North Kelvin, Scottish Gaelic: Cealbhainn a Tuath) is a residential district of the Scottish city of Glasgow.

It is often regarded as a subdistrict of Maryhill, sharing its G20 postcode, as well as its House of Commons electoral constituency prior to incorporation into Glasgow North in 2005. However, North Kelvinside was never a part of Maryhill Police Burgh prior to its incorporation into Glasgow in 1912 and the area is markedly different socially and architecturally.

North Kelvinside was originally part of a country estate, which became enveloped by the surrounding city. As a result, many buildings date from the early twentieth century. It is located on the northern edge of Glasgow's west end and its southern boundary is marked by the River Kelvin. It is close to the Glasgow Botanic Gardens, the former BBC Scotland building on Queen Margaret Drive, and in the vicinity of the University of Glasgow, although all are actually outwith the North Kelvinside area itself. Being close to the university, many students and academics live in the area.

Kelvinside House was the property of Lord Provost Sir James Campbell, and was located in the area that is now North Kelvinside. It was there that his son, the future Prime Minister Sir Henry Campbell-Bannerman was born 1836.

North Kelvinside is not directly north of the more upmarket area Kelvinside, which is mainly located to the west. Rather, the area is so named because it is located on the north bank of the River Kelvin. The housing consists mainly of tenements, although there are also some grander villa-type buildings, converted Victorian townhouses, pre-industrial cottages and a small, well-maintained (now mainly ex-)council estate. The area has a reputation for being quiet and tranquil, despite its central location. Unusually, it is impossible to fully traverse the district by car in any direction, due in part to a system of road-blocks designed to combat ratrunning.

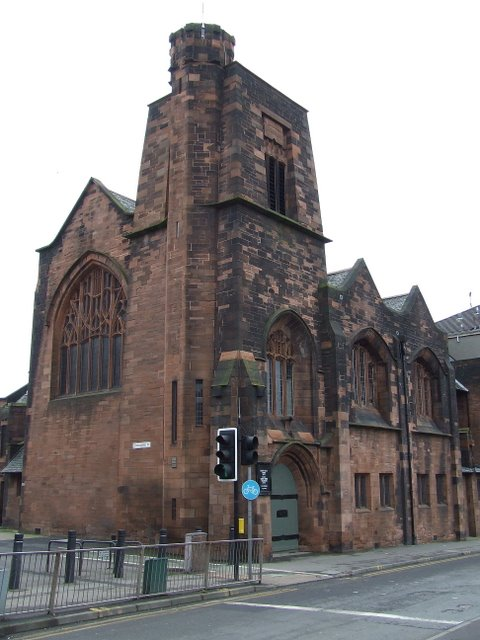
The Mackintosh Church, Queen's Cross

Architecturally significant buildings in the area include the Kelvin Stevenson Memorial Church (by J. J. Stevenson, 1898); Gillespie, Kidd & Coia's St. Charles Parish Church (1959), noted for its hyperbolic paraboloid concrete roof and Stations of the Cross sculptures by Benno Schotz; and the unique Mackintosh Church at Queen's Cross, the only church designed by Charles Rennie Mackintosh. Another local landmark is Alexander "Greek" Thomson's Sixty Steps (1872). Contemporary published sources suggest that the steps, associated retaining wall and the original Queen Margaret Bridge were actually part of John E. Walker's co-ordinated civil engineering works of 1869/1870 to the designs of Ritchie Rodger C.E. in preparation for the development of the suburb.

North Kelvinside also contains the former pub where the 'balcony scene' in the film Trainspotting was shot, the Kelvin walkway along the banks of the eponymous river, linking Kelvingrove Park and the Botanic Gardens, and a row of small independent shops and cafes. Outdoor amenities include the North Kelvin Meadow and the Children's Wood which form local green spaces. Scotland's oldest dedicated squash club since 1934, SSRC (Scottish Squash and Racketball Club), is to be found on Malloch Street a short distance from Queen Margaret Drive, with connections going back to the military presence at the barracks that are now Wyndford. The area is also within walking distance of the shops, pubs and restaurants on Great Western and Byres Roads.

Famous current or former residents include former Prime Minister Sir Henry Campbell-Bannerman, the nurse Louisa Jordan, the actor Robbie Coltrane, the comedian Stanley Baxter, director Lynne Ramsay, screenwriter and playwright Peter McDougall, members of the rock band Teenage Fanclub, TV interior designers Justin Ryan and Colin McAllister, YouTube sensation Rombodog, Ian Davidson MP and former Maryhill MP, Maria Fyfe.

There was a North Kelvinside Secondary School that served most of the Maryhill district of Glasgow. However, the school was closed and the vast majority of the pupils transferred to Cleveden Secondary School in the Kelvindale area on the other side of the River Kelvin to the west. Former pupils include actor Robert Carlyle and musician Jimmy Somerville as well as Janis Sharp; mother of Gary McKinnon. The area is served by North Kelvinside Parish Church, a Church of Scotland congregation which was made famous after World War II, by the work and writing of its minister Rev Tom Allan, particularly his book The Face of My Parish. However, in recent years, the church building was demolished, leaving only the halls which are now in poor condition. The congregation has also been in sharp decline and is currently uniting with the nearby Ruchill Parish Church.

Just south of the area is Hillhead, which forms the heart of Glasgow's West End, and to the north is Maryhill. To the west are Kelvindale and Kelvinside, and to the east Firhill and Woodside.

The district, along with Firhill and Murano Street Student Village, is served by North Kelvin Community Council.

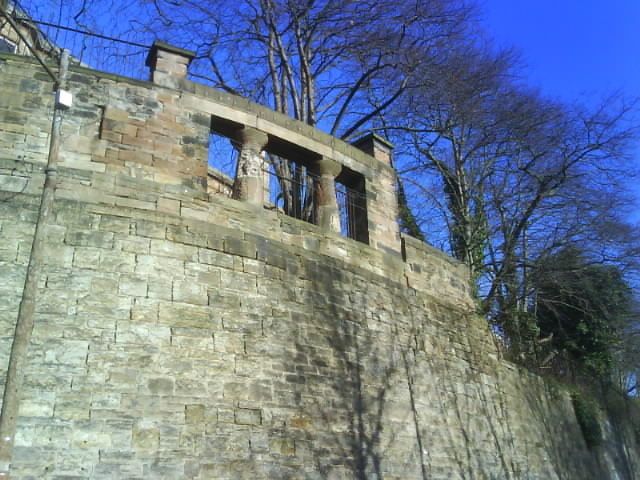
Detail of Retaining Wall at the 'Sixty Steps'

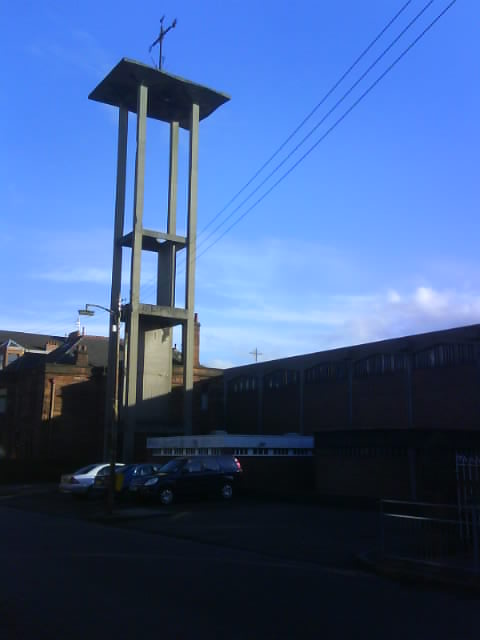
St Charles Parish Church

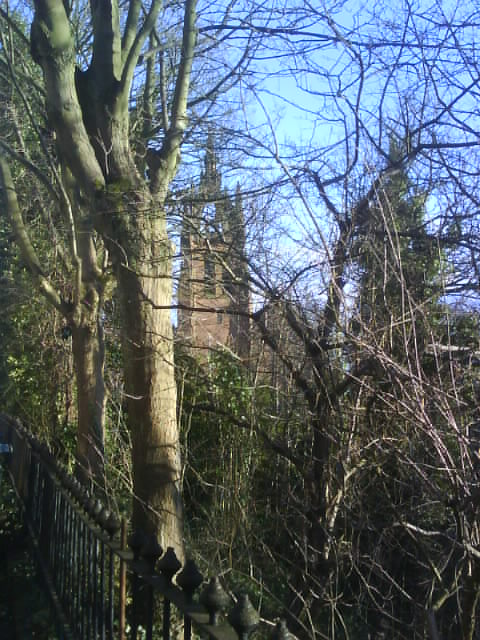
Kelvin Stevenson Memorial Church

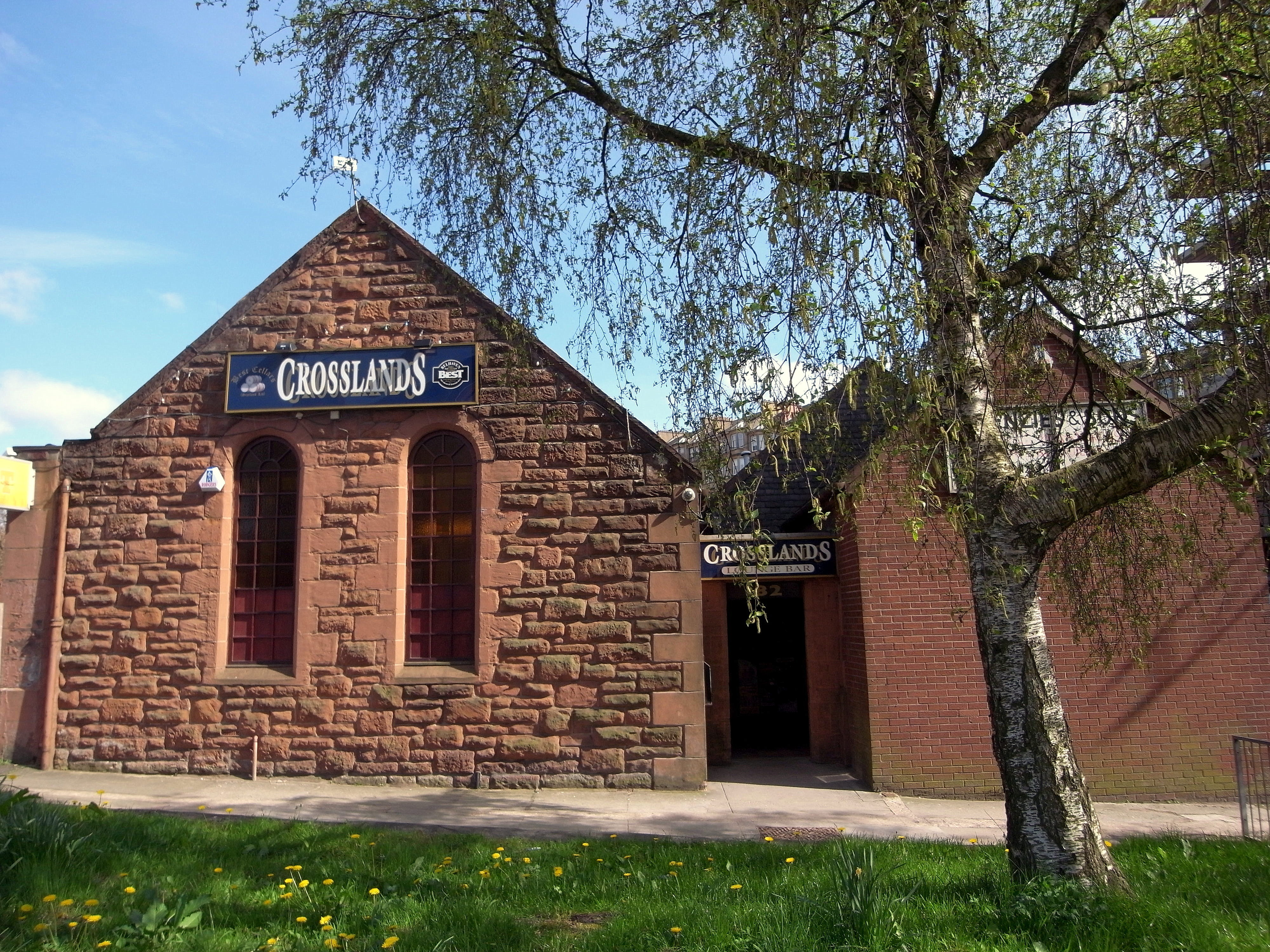
Crosslands pub, featured in Trainspotting, Danny Boyle's film from 1996.
