= Archibald Lyle =

Scottish footballer

Personal information
- Full name: Archibald Lyle
- Date of birth: 10 February 1886
- Place of birth: Maryhill, Scotland
- Position: Inside right

Senior career*
Years	Team	Apps	(Gls)
1909	Tottenham Hotspur	1	(0)
- * Club domestic league appearances and goals

Archibald Lyle (10 February 1886–unknown) was a Scottish footballer who played for Tottenham Hotspur.

== Football career ==
Lyle, an inside right played one match for Tottenham Hotspur in 1909.
