= Ruchill Parish Church =

- Ruchill Kelvinside Parish Church
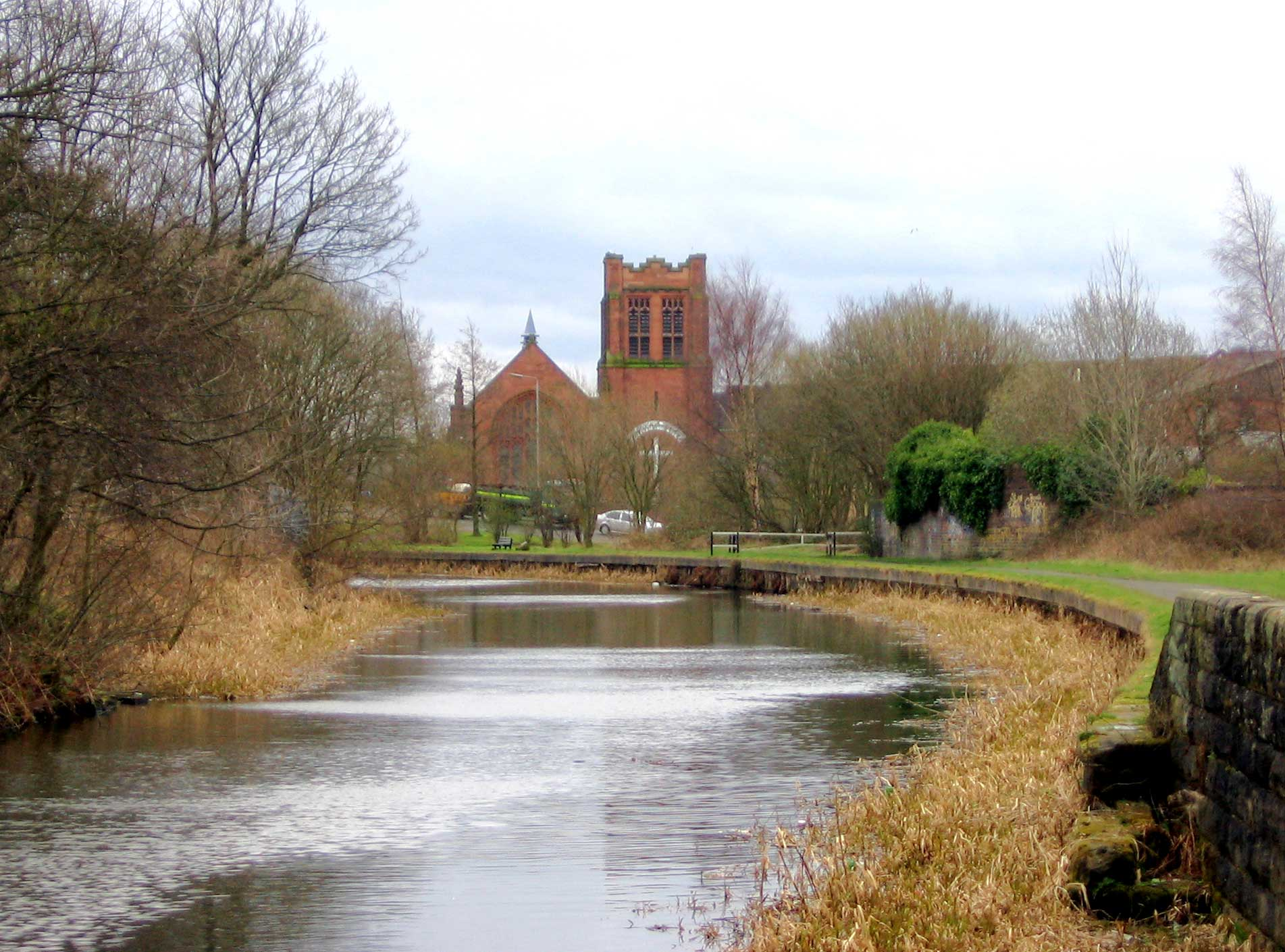
- Church from the Forth and Clyde Canal
- Ruchill Parish Church
- 55°53′12″N 4°17′00″W
- Location: Glasgow
- Country: Scotland
- Denomination: Church of Scotland
- Website: rkpc.org.uk

History
- Status: Active
- Founder: United Free Church of Scotland

Architecture
- Functional status: Parish church
- Architect: Neil Campbell Duff
- Architectural type: Church
- Style: Neo-Gothic
- Years built: 1903–1905

Administration
- Parish: Ruchill & Kelvinside

Listed Building – Category B
- Designated: 15 December 1970
- Reference no.: LB32355

Ruchill Parish Church is an early-20th-century parish church of the Church of Scotland located in the Ruchill area of Glasgow.

== History of the building ==
Founded as a parish church of the United Free Church of Scotland, the church was built between 1903 and 1905. It was designed by Neil Campbell Duff in the Neo-Gothic style. It was built using Old Red Sandstone. A bell tower and nave gable were also built. The church contrasts greatly with the adjoining Ruchill Church Hall, designed by Charles Rennie Mackintosh and built in 1899.

== History of the congregation ==
Built as the Ruchill United Free Church, the church was renamed Ruchill Parish Church in 1929 upon union with the Church of Scotland. In July 2022, the congregation of Maryhill entered into a union with Ruchill Kelvinside, adapting the name Maryhill Ruchill Parish Church.
