= Ruchill Church Hall =

Church building in Glasgow, Scotland

Coordinates: 55.88673°N 4.28372°W

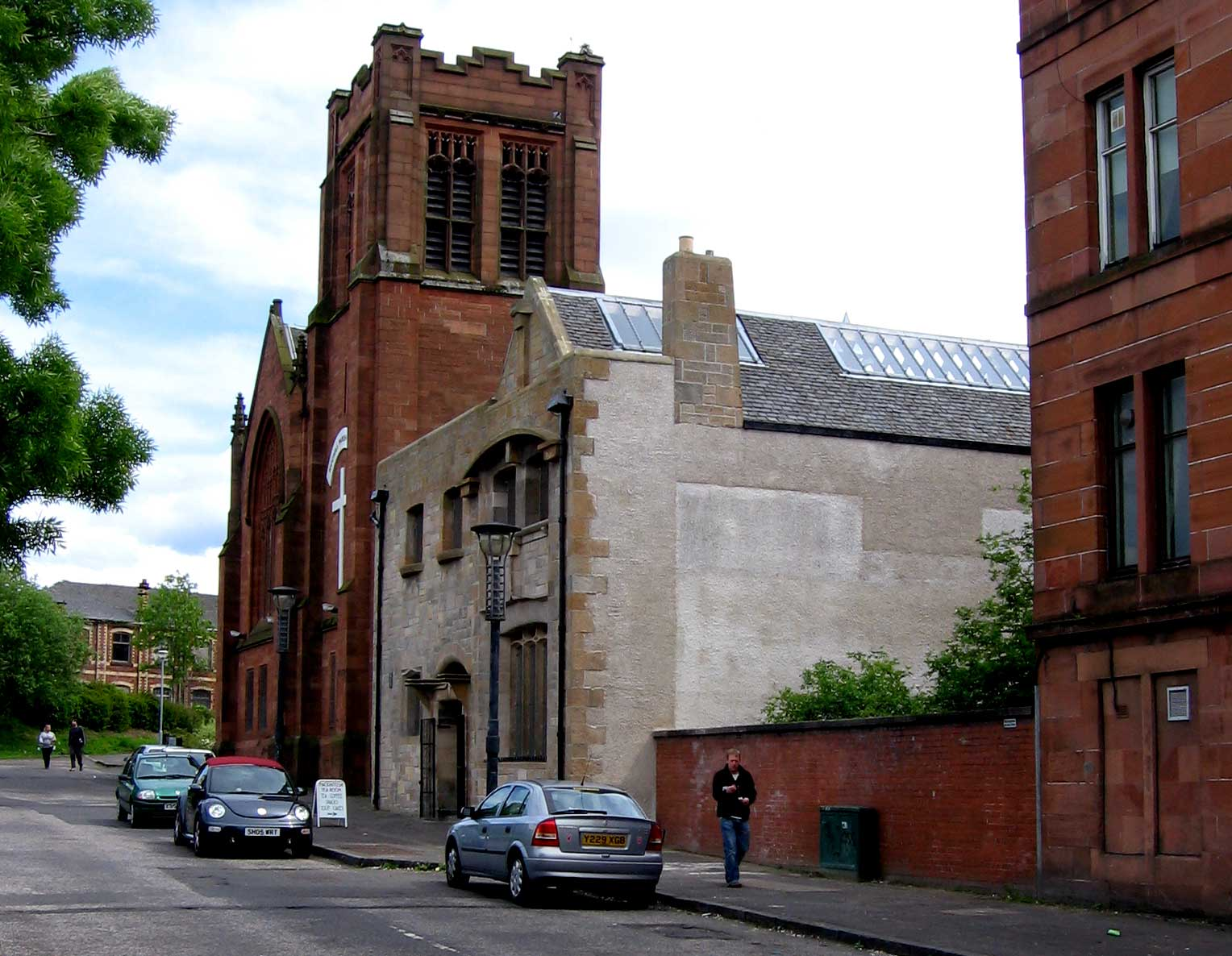
The halls stand next to the church tower. In the background a factory stands on the other side of the canal.

Ruchill Church Hall, designed by Charles Rennie Mackintosh, was built as a mission for the Free Church of Scotland and completed in 1899. It is located at 15/17 Shakespeare Street, a side road off Maryhill Road, Glasgow, Scotland, close to the bridge which takes Ruchill Street across the Forth and Clyde Canal to the Ruchill area, and near a shopping centre on the main road. The adjacent church closer to the canal was constructed later, designed by a different architect.

The building provides two halls, with the main hall having a section divided off by a sliding folding partition, and two committee rooms. It is in active use by the congregation of the church, and is open daily providing community facilities as well as a "Mackintosh Tea Room" providing teas and snacks in the main hall for anyone wanting to visit.

Entering from Shakespeare Street, a committee room is to the right, while to the left a passageway leads past a screened washbasin to a door to the stairwell. Next on the left is a small kitchen / servery, while straight ahead from the main entrance doors lead into the corner of the main hall. On the right a large bay is separated off from the main hall with a sliding folding partition incorporating high level glazed panels with Mackintosh's characteristic stained glass inserts.

The stair leads up to a short corridor past toilet facilities located above the kitchen, leading to an upper committee room directly above the committee room downstairs, and to an upper hall above the bay off the main hall. These two rooms are separated by a sliding folding partition which can be opened to form one long rectangular space. The roof structure to the upper committee room and hall is exposed, with roof lights to both rooms, and its gable forms a strong shape to the right of the front elevation.
